= Mizuike Pottery Kiln ruins =

Mizuike pottery production site
- 水池土器製作遺跡 (Japanese)
- Mizuike pottery production site Mizuike Pottery Kiln ruins (Japan)
- 34°31′46″N 136°38′13″E
- Periods: Nara period
- Location: Meiwa, Mie, Japan
- Region: Kansai region

Site notes
- Public access: Yes

The Mizuike pottery production site (水池土器製作遺跡, Mizuike doki seisaku iseki) is an archaeological site with the ruins of a large-scale Nara period pottery production site, located in the Myōjō neighborhood of the town of Meiwa, Mie in the Kansai region of Japan. It was designated a National Historic Site of Japan in 1970.

== Overview ==
The Mizuike pottery production site is located on a fluvial terrace with an elevation of about ten meters, extending northward in the southern portion of the Ise Plain, approximately halfway between the cities of Matsusaka and Ise, and about four kilometers from the site of the Saiku. Per archaeological excavations starting in 1976, the site was found to contain the traces of three pit dwellings, four excavated pillar dwellings, 16 kilns for the firing of earthenware, 11 prehistoric storage pits, two clay pits, and one well. These features occupied a site on a gentle slope with a width of about 100 meters and length of about 200 meters, surrounded by a moat. The kilns were roughly triangular, with lengths of 2.6 to 4.2 meters and widths of 1.2 to 1.8 meters. The foundations of the buildings were no different from those found in ordinary settlements; however, there were a very large number of shards of Haji ware and a small amount of Sue ware found mixed with charcoal and ash in the soil around the kilns. These shards have been dated to the early Nara period, and the presence of small amounts of ash glazed pottery shards indicates that the site ay have been active through the late Nara period. Currently, the site is preserved as the Mizuike Historic Site Park (水池史跡公園). It is about a ten-minute walk from Myōjō Station on the Kintetsu Yamada Line.

== See also ==
- List of Historic Sites of Japan (Mie)
