= Miya =

Miya may refer to:

== Places in Japan ==
- Mikawa-Miya Station in Aichi
- Miya, Gifu
- Miya-juku, one of the stations of the Tōkaidō
- Miya River (Mie)
- Miya River, a river known as the Jinzū River after if flows from Gifu to Toyama Prefecture

== People ==
=== People from Japan ===
- Miya (musician) (born 1979), musician and guitarist of rock band Mucc
- Miya (born Haruka Miyauchi, 1993), singer and former member of South Korean girl group GWSN
- Miya Sato (born 1986), volleyball player
- Miya Serizono, voice actress
- Miya Tachibana (born 1974), Olympic silver medalist in synchronized swimming
- Miya Cech (born 2007), American actress
- Daiki Miya (宮 大樹; born 1996), Japanese footballer
- Shiro Miya (1943–2012), enka singer
- Yoshiko Miya (1945–2015), Japanese journalist

=== People from elsewhere ===
- Miya Ando, artist
- Miya Folick, American musician
- Miya George (born 1992), Indian actress
- Miya Hisaka Silva, Founder/Director of El Teatro de Danza Contemporanea de El Salvador
- Miya Masaoka (born 1958), Japanese-American musician and composer
- Miya Muqi (born 1987), Chinese actress
- Miya Ocego (born 1999/2000), English actress and model
- Farouk Miya (born 1997), Ugandan footballer
- Hasina Miya, Nepalese politician
- Sadrul Miya Haque, Nepalese politician
- Salim Miya Ansari, Nepalese politician

== Fictional characters ==
- Atsumu Miya, a character in the anime series Haikyuu!!
- Osamu Miya, a character in the anime series Haikyuu!!
- Miya Shimada, name of comic book character Tsunami (DC Comics)
- Miya Fuski, a fictional character created by Jivram Joshi for children's literature in Gujarati
- Utsutsu Miya (宮 うつつ), a character in the anime series Gatchaman Crowds

== Other uses ==
- Crocidura miya, also known as the Sri Lankan Long-tailed Shrew
- Fushimi-no-miya, the oldest branch of the Japanese Imperial Family
- Miya people, an immigrant group in Assam, India
- Na Asamiya, an immigrant group in Assam, India
- Miya language, a language in Nigeria
- Miya's, a defunct Japanese restaurant in New Haven, Connecticut, US

== See also ==
- Miyan (disambiguation)
