= Saikū Station =

Railway station in Meiwa, Mie Prefecture, Japan

Saikū Station 斎宮駅
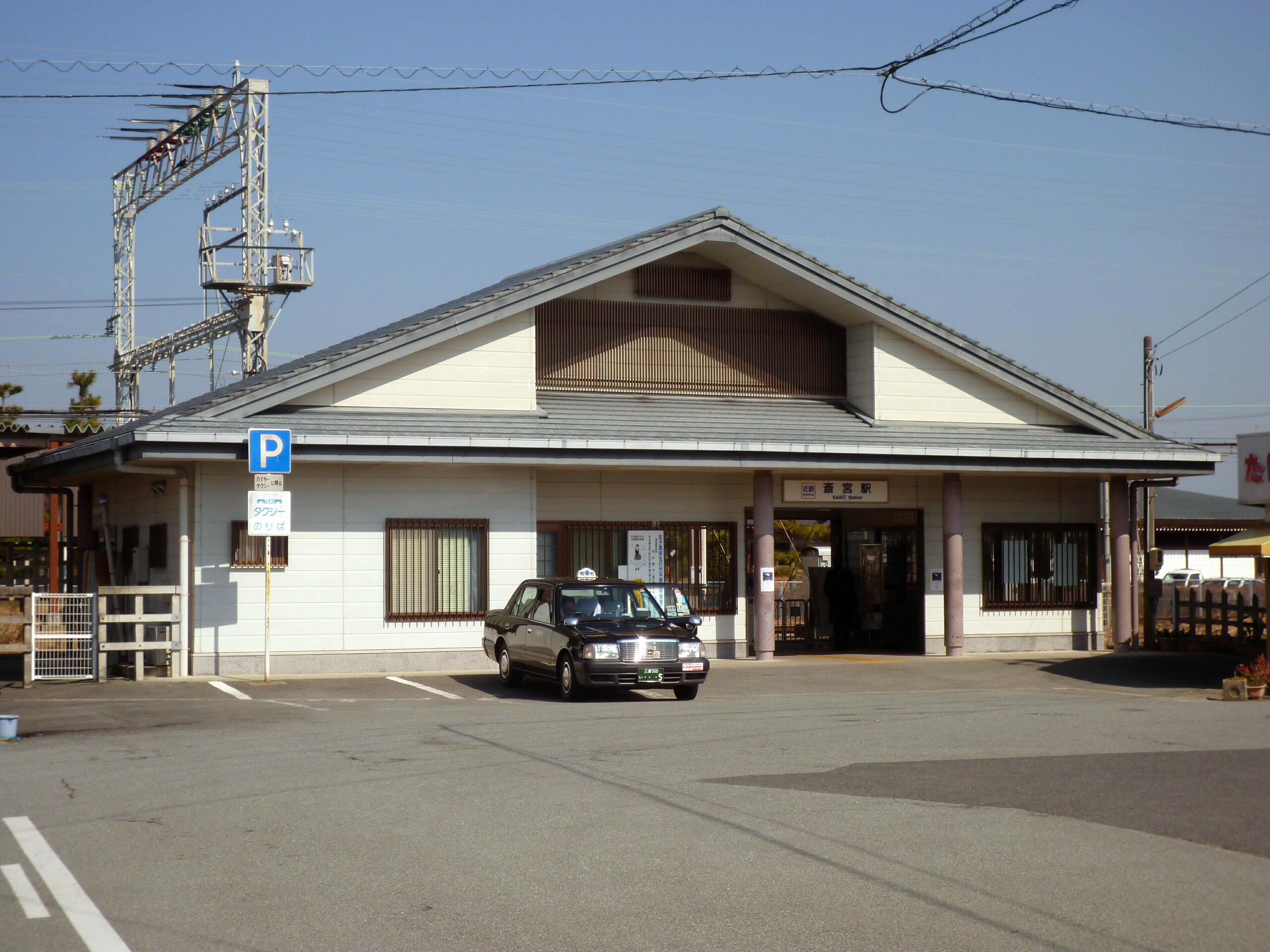
- Saikū Station in 2008

General information
- Location: 3043-3 Saikū, Meiw-cho, Taki-gun, Mie-ken 515-0321; Japan
- Coordinates: 34.5376°N 136.6153°E
- Operator: Kintetsu Railway
- Line: Yamada Line
- Distance: 17.1 km from Ise-Nakagawa
- Platforms: 2 side platforms
- Connections: Bus terminal

Other information
- Station code: M68
- Website: Official website

History
- Opened: March 27, 1930

Passengers
- FY2019: 850 daily
Location
- Location within Mie Prefecture Location within Japan

Saikū Station (斎宮駅, Saikū-eki) is a passenger railway station in located in the town of Meiwa, Taki District, Mie Prefecture, Japan, operated by the private railway operator Kintetsu Railway.

== Lines ==
Saikū Station is served by the Yamada Line, and is located 17.1 rail kilometers from the terminus of the line at Ise-Nakagawa Station.

== Station layout ==
The station was consists of two opposed side platforms connected by a level crossing. The station is unattended.

=== Platforms ===
1	■ Yamada Line	for Ujiyamada, Toba and Kashikojima
2	■ Yamada Line	for Ise-Nakagawa

== Adjacent stations ==
«	Service	»
Yamada Line
Koishiro	Local	Myōjō

== History ==
Saikū Station opened on March 27, 1930, as a station on the Sangu Kyuko Electric Railway. On March 15, 1941, the line merged with Osaka Electric Railway to become a station on Kansai Kyuko Railway's Yamada Line. This line in turn was merged with the Nankai Electric Railway on June 1, 1944, to form Kintetsu. A new station building was completed in 1944; this was replaced by a modern building in 1992.

== Passenger statistics ==
In fiscal 2019, the station was used by an average of 850 passengers daily (boarding passengers only).

== Surrounding area ==
- Small-scale model of Saikū, ancient home of the Saiō
- Saikū Historical Museum
- Meiwa Town Hall
