= 小俣駅 =

小俣駅 may refer to:

- Obata Station (Mie)
- Omata Station
