= Meiwa, Mie =

Meiwa 明和町
- Town
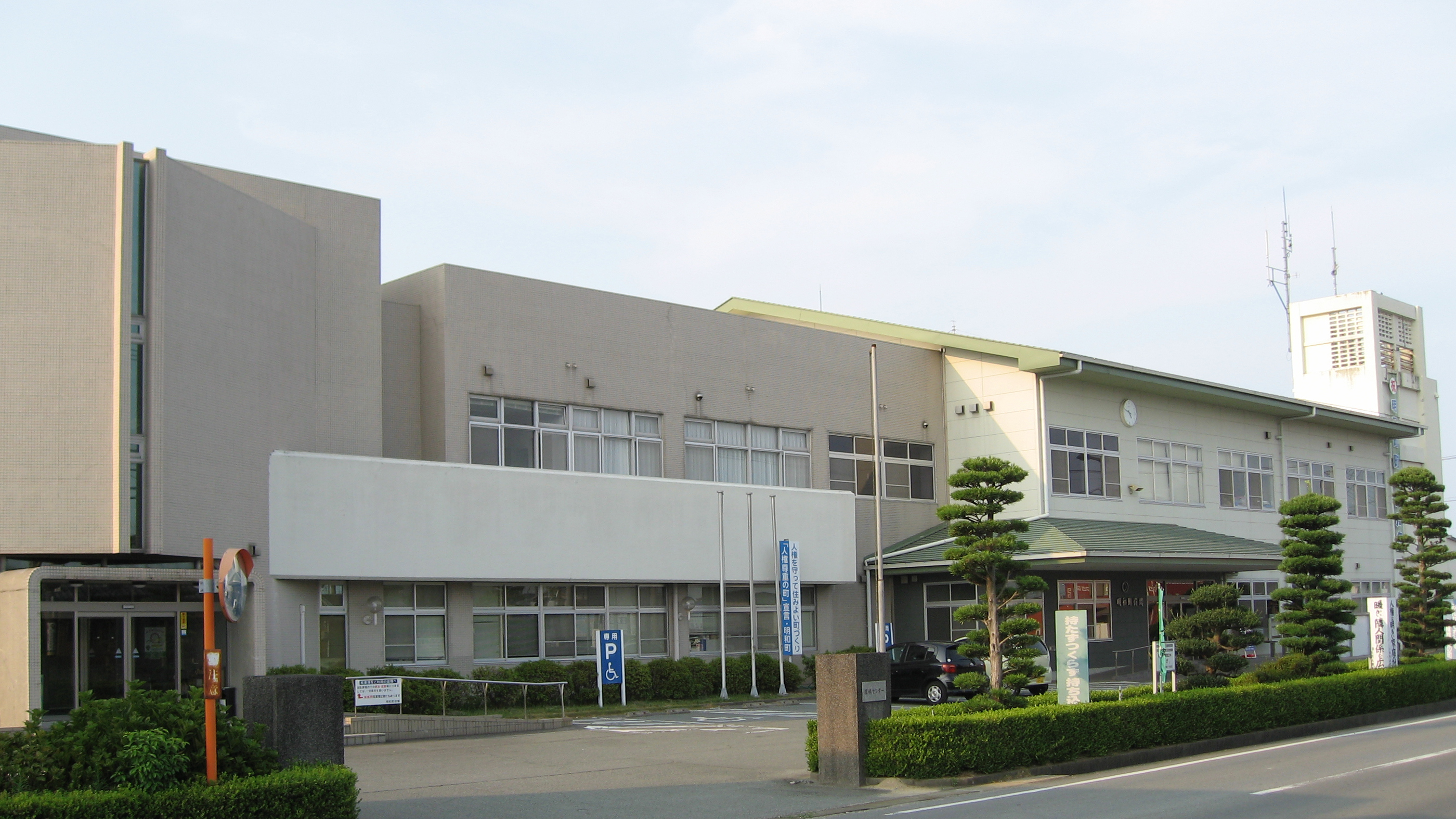
- Meiwa town hall

- Flag Seal

- Location of Meiwa in Mie Prefecture

- Coordinates: 34°33′N 136°37′E
- Country: Japan
- Region: Kansai
- Prefecture: Mie
- District: Taki

Government
  - Mayor: Tetsuya Sekoguchi

Area
  - Total: 40.92 km^{2} (15.80 sq mi)

Population (August 2021)
  - Total: 23,015
  - Density: 562.4/km^{2} (1,457/sq mi)
- Time zone: UTC+9 (Japan Standard Time)
- Tree: Inumaki
- Flower: Iris
- Phone number: 0596-52-7111
- Address: 945 Daigaku-Umanoue, Meiwa-chō, Taki-gun, Mie-ken 515-0332
- Website: Official website

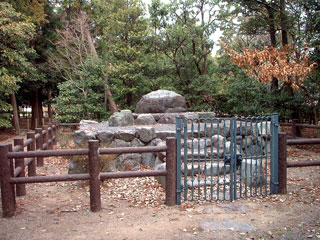
Site of the Saikū

Meiwa (明和町, Meiwa-chō) is a town located in Mie Prefecture, Japan. As of 1 August 2021, the town had an estimated population of 23,015 in 9309 households and a population density of 560 persons per km^{2}. The total area of the town was 40.92 square kilometres (15.80 sq mi).

== Geography ==
Meiwa is located in eastern Kii Peninsula in central Mie Prefecture between Matsusaka and Ise, facing Ise Bay on the Pacific Ocean. Te land is generally flat and agricultural.

== Climate ==
Meiwa has a humid subtropical climate (Köppen Cfa) characterized by warm summers and cool winters with light to no snowfall. The average annual temperature in Meiwa is 15.5 °C. The average annual rainfall is 2015 mm with September as the wettest month. The temperatures are highest on average in August, at around 26.3 °C, and lowest in January, at around 5.1 °C.

== Demographics ==
Per Japanese census data, the population of Meiwa has been increasing over the past 60 years.

Historical population
Year	Pop.	±%
1920	13,835	—
1930	14,621	+5.7%
1940	14,663	+0.3%
1950	18,415	+25.6%
1960	17,390	−5.6%
1970	17,223	−1.0%
1980	19,504	+13.2%
1990	21,484	+10.2%
2000	22,300	+3.8%
2010	23,834	+6.9%

== History ==
In pre-modern Japan, Meiwa was best known as the location of the ancient Saikū, the residence of the Saiō, an unmarried Imperial princess who, in place of the Emperor, was dispatched to serve as the High Priestess of Ise Grand Shrine to perform three important Shinto rituals. During the Edo period the area developed into a thriving agricultural center and post-town, providing lodging to people making the pilgrimage to Ise Grand Shrine. Ōyodo Village was established on April 1, 1889, during the Meiji period establishment of the modern municipalities system. It was elevated to town status on February 1, 1924, and was renamed Sanwa on September 3, 1955. In 1958, the town of Sanwa and the neighboring village of Saimei merged to form the town of Meiwa.

== Government ==
Meiwa has a mayor-council form of government with a directly elected mayor and a unicameral city council of 14 members. Meiwa, collectively with the other municipalities of Taki District, contributes two members to the Mie Prefectural Assembly. In terms of national politics, the town is part of Mie 4th district of the lower house of the Diet of Japan.

== Economy ==
Meiwa has a mixed economy based on agriculture, commercial fishing and light manufacturing, and serves as a commercial center for the surrounding region.

== Education ==
Meiwa has six public elementary schools and one public middle school operated by the town government. The town does not have a high school.

== Transportation ==
=== Railway ===
Kintetsu Railway - Yamada Line

(for Osaka, Nagoya ) • Saikū • Myōjō • ( for Ujiyamada)

=== Bus ===
Sanco does not operate bus lines to Meiwa, however the town of Meiwa runs a small bus line that connects Myōjō Station and Saikū Station with the Meiwa City Hall and the huge Meiwa Jusco shopping center. Buses run hourly from the stations and only operate between 8:00am and 6:00pm.

=== Highway ===
- National Route 23

== Local attractions ==
- Saikū Historical Museum
- Itsukinomiya Historical Experience - Built without the use of modern technology, this building is crafted to resemble the Saiō's ancient residence. Just outside this building is a small-scale reconstruction of the entire Saikū complex.
- Ōyodo Swimming Beach - A small beach in northeastern Meiwa.

== Festivals ==
- Saiō Festival - Held annually for two days on the first weekend in June near the Saikū ruins, with a procession of people clad in Heian period dress.
- Ōyodo Gion Festival - Held annually on the last Saturday of July or the first Saturday of August, with fireworks over Ōyodo harbour.
