= Akeno =

Akeno may refer to:

- Akeno, Ibaraki, a former town in Makabe District, Ibaraki Prefecture, Japan
- Akeno, Yamanashi, a former village in Kitakoma District, Yamanashi Prefecture, Japan
- Akeno Station, a railway station in Ise, Mie Prefecture, Japan
- Akeno Air Field, a military aerodrome of the Japan Ground Self-Defense Force

== People with the given name ==
- Akeno Watanabe (渡辺 明乃, born 1982), Japanese voice actress

Fictional characters:

- Akeno Himejima (姫島 朱乃), a character in the light novel series High School DxD
- Akeno Misaki (岬 明乃), protagonist of the anime television series High School Fleet
- Akeno Shiranui (不知火 明乃), a character in the manga series Seto no Hanayome
