= Koishiro Station =

Railway station in Matsusaka, Mie Prefecture, Japan

Koishiro Station 漕代駅
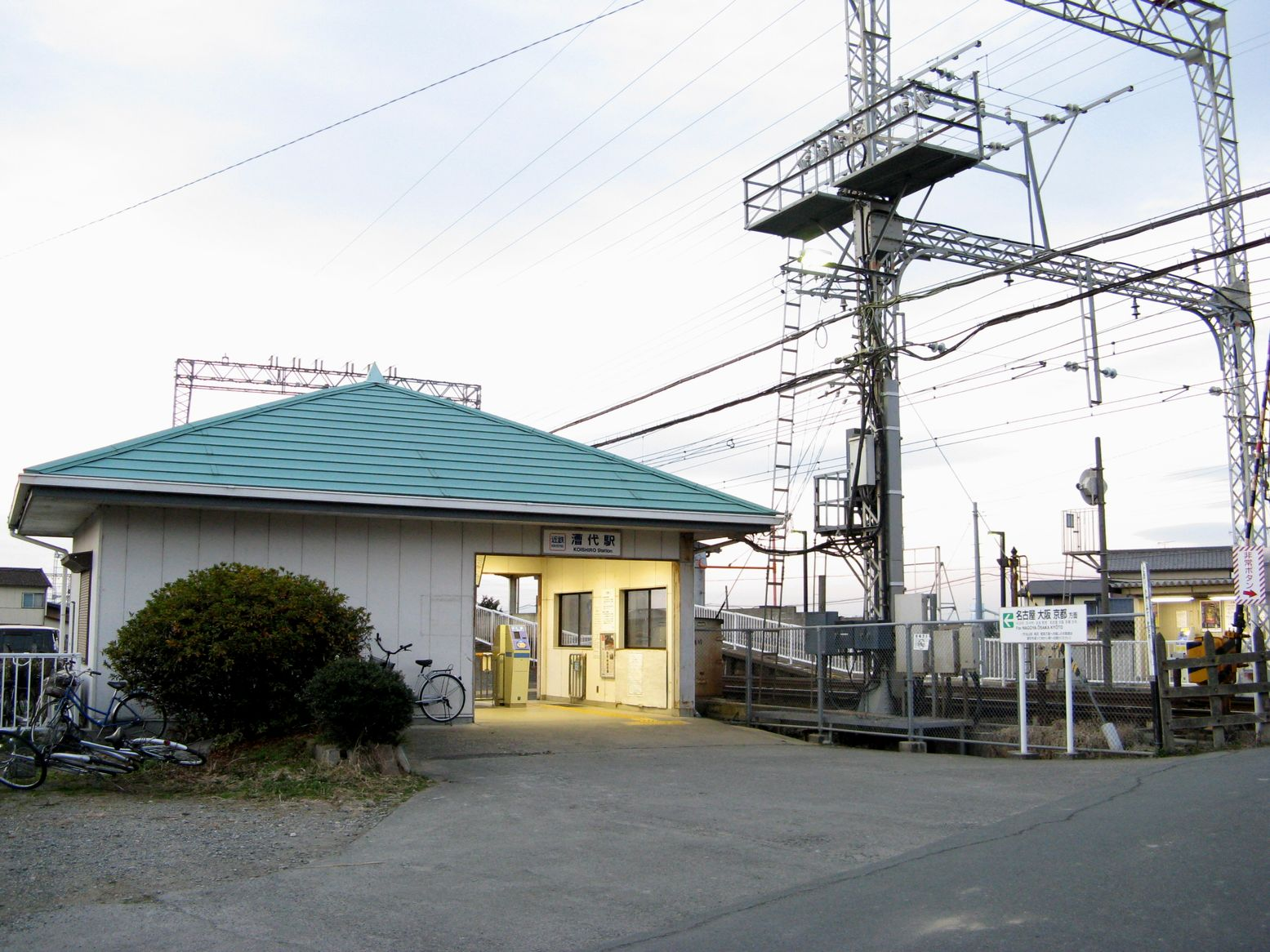
- Koishiro Station in 2008

General information
- Location: 1108-5 Inagi-cho, Matsusaka-shi, Mie-ken 515-0212; Japan
- Coordinates: 34.5412°N 136.6009°E
- Operator: Kintetsu Railway
- Line: Yamada Line
- Distance: 15.8 km from Ise-Nakagawa
- Platforms: 2 side platforms
- Connections: Bus terminal

Other information
- Station code: M67
- Website: Official website

History
- Opened: October 23, 1943

Passengers
- FY2019: 189 daily
Location
- Location within Mie Prefecture Location within Japan

Koishiro Station (漕代駅, Koishiro-eki) is a passenger railway station located in the city of Matsusaka, Mie Prefecture, Japan, operated by the private railway operator Kintetsu Railway.

== Lines ==
Koishiro Station is served by the Yamada Line, and is located 15.8 rail kilometers from the starting point of the line at Ise-Nakagawa Station.

== Station layout ==
The station consists of two opposed side platforms connected by a level crossing. The station is unattended.

=== Platforms ===
1	■ Yamada Line	for Ujiyamada, Toba and Kashikojima
2	■ Yamada Line	for Ise-Nakagawa

== Adjacent stations ==
«	Service	»
Kintetsu Yamada Line
Kushida	Local	Saikū

== History ==
Koishiro Station opened on October 23, 1943 as a station on the Kansai Express Railway's Yamada Line. This line was merged with the Nankai Electric Railway on June 1, 1944 to form Kintetsu. The station has been unattended since February 21, 2005.

== Passenger statistics ==
In fiscal 2019, the station was used by an average of 189 passengers daily (boarding passengers only).

== Surrounding area ==
- Matsusaka City Koshiro Elementary School

== See also ==
- List of railway stations in Japan
