= Yamada Line =

Yamada Line may refer to either of the following railway lines in Japan:

- Yamada Line (JR East), a railway line in Iwate Prefecture, connecting Morioka and Miyako
- Yamada Line (Kintetsu), a railway line in Mie Prefecture, connecting Matsusaka and Ise
