= Miyamachi Station =

Railway station in Ise, Mie Prefecture, Japan

Miyamachi Station 宮町駅
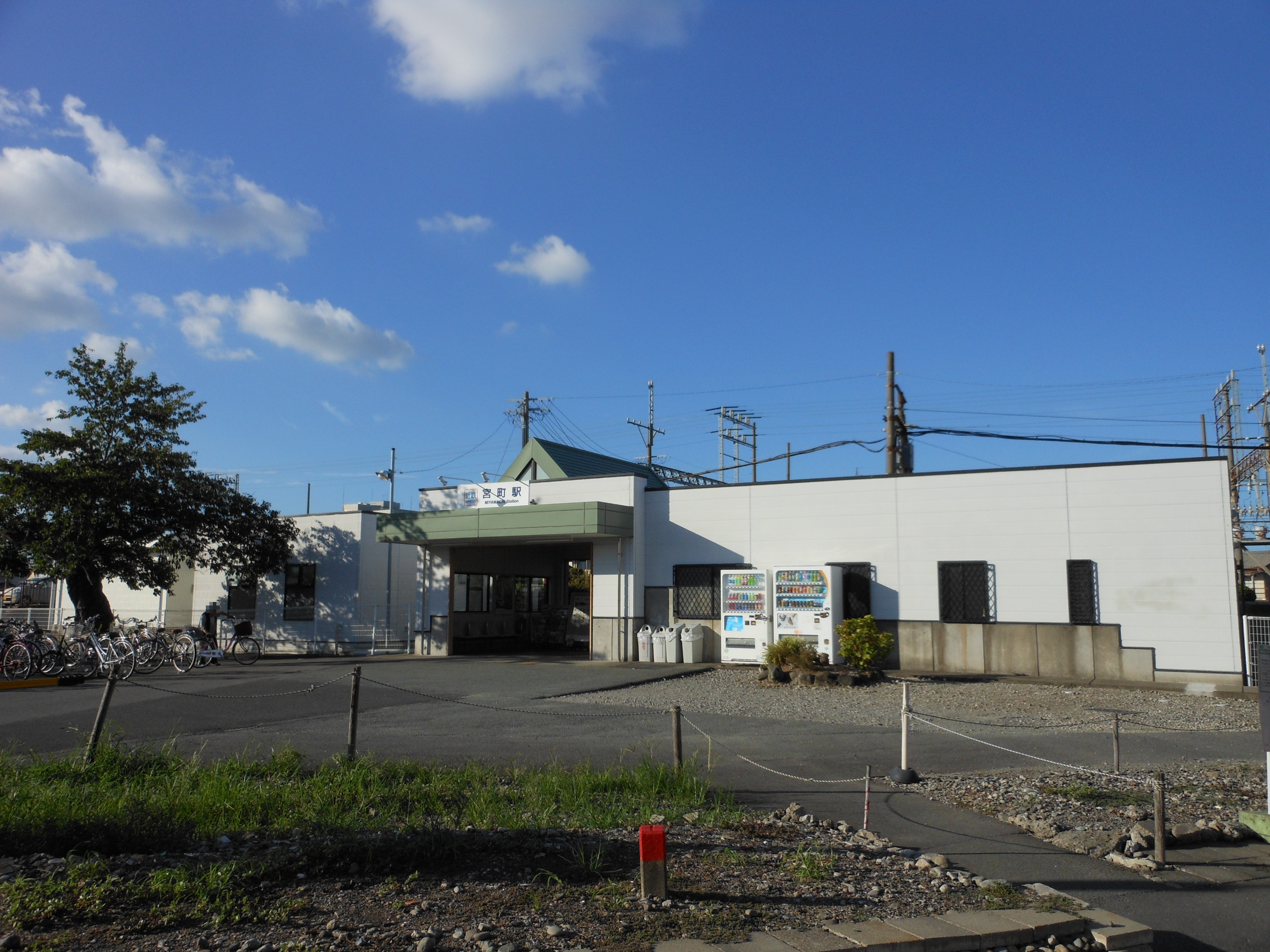
- Miyamachi Station west exit

General information
- Location: 686 Takabuku, Misono-cho, Ise-shi, Mie-ken 516-0805; Japan
- Coordinates: 34.4980°N 136.6983°E
- Operator: Kintetsu Railway
- Line: Yamada Line
- Distance: 26.3 km from Ise-Nakagawa
- Platforms: 2 side platforms
- Connections: Bus terminal

Other information
- Station code: M72
- Website: Official website

History
- Opened: March 27, 1930
- Former names: Gekūmae (until 1933)

Passengers
- FY2019: 620 daily
Location
- Location within Mie Prefecture Location within Japan

Miyamachi Station (宮町駅, Miyamachi-eki) is a passenger railway station located in the city of Ise, Mie Prefecture, Japan, and is operated by the private railway operator Kintetsu Railway.

== Lines ==
Miyamachi Station is served by the Yamada Line, and is located 26.3 rail kilometers from the terminus of the line at Ise-Nakagawa Station.

== Station layout ==
The station consists of two opposed side platforms, connected by an underground passage. The station is unattended.

=== Platforms ===
1	■ Yamada Line	for Ujiyamada, Toba and Kashikojima
2	■ Yamada Line	for Ise-Nakagawa, Nagoya and Osaka

== Adjacent stations ==
«	Service	»
Yamada Line
Obata	Local	Iseshi
Matsusaka	Express (Nagoya Line through trains) (in the morning and the evening)	Iseshi

== History ==
Miyamae Station opened on March 27, 1930 as Gekūmae Station (外宮前駅, Gekūmae-eki) on the Sangu Express Electric Railway. On March 15, 1941, the line merged with Osaka Electric Railway to become a station on Kansai Express Railway's Yamada Line. This line in turn was merged with the Nankai Electric Railway on June 1, 1944 to form Kintetsu. The station was renamed to its present name in March 1933. A new station building was completed in March 1997.

== Passenger statistics ==
In fiscal 2019, the station was used by an average of 620 passengers daily (boarding passengers only).

== Surrounding area ==
- Shintomiza independent movie theater
- Yokohama Rubber Mie plant
- Ujiyamada High School
- Ise Library
- JR - Yamada-Kamiguchi Station

== See also ==
- List of railway stations in Japan
