= Myōjō Station =

Railway station in Meiwa, Mie Prefecture, Japan

Myōjō Station 明星駅
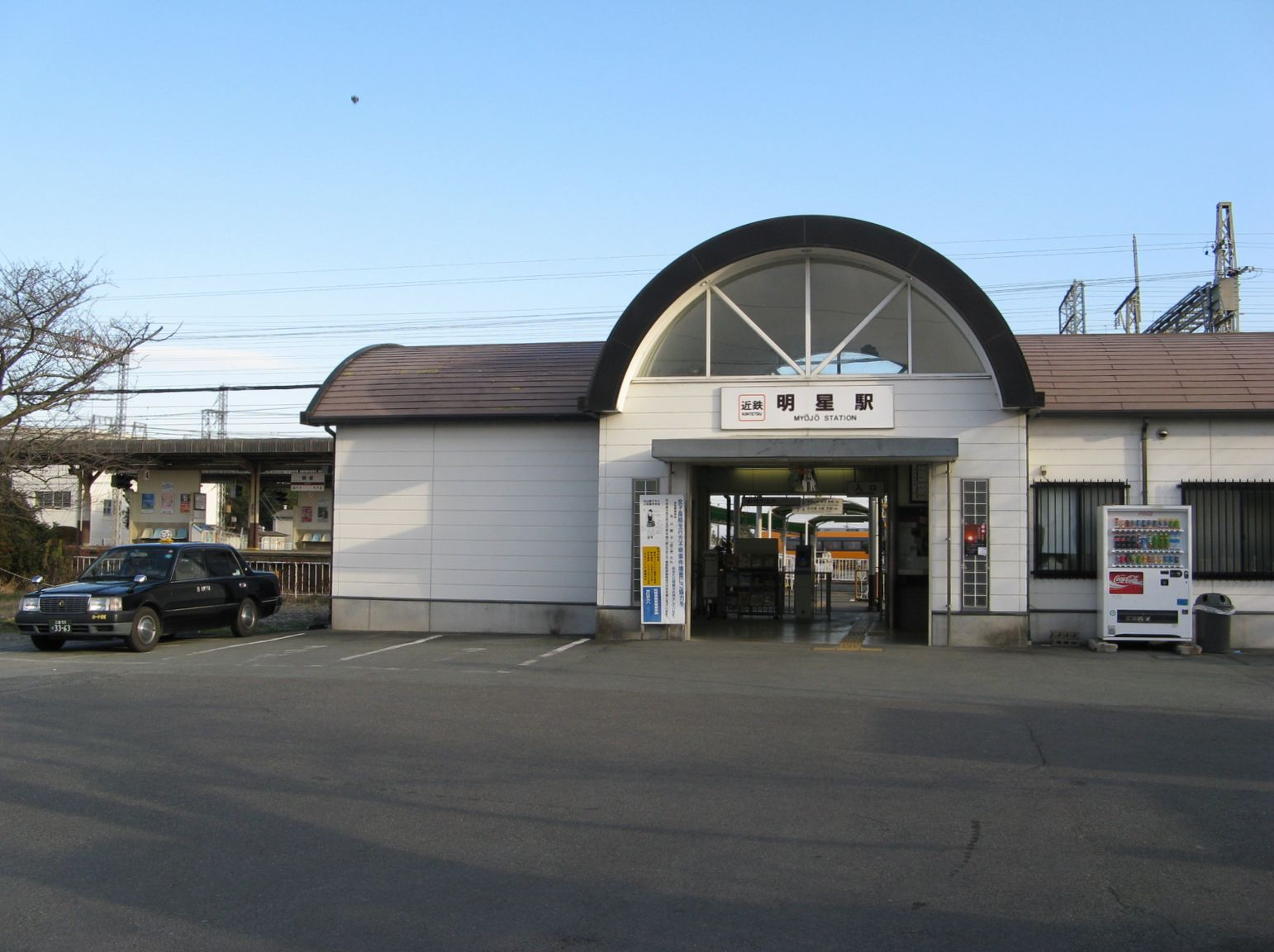
- Myōjō Station in 2008

General information
- Location: 2564 Myōjō, Meiwa-chō, Taki-gun, Mie-ken 515-0313; Japan
- Coordinates: 34°31′52.2″N 136°38′34.08″E
- Operator: Kintetsu Railway
- Line: Yamada Line
- Distance: 19.8 km from Ise-Nakagawa
- Platforms: 2 island platforms
- Connections: Bus terminal

Other information
- Station code: M69
- Website: Official website

History
- Opened: March 27, 1930

Passengers
- FY2019: 646 daily
Location
- Location within Mie Prefecture Location within Japan

Myōjō Station (明星駅, Myōjō-eki) is a passenger railway station in located in the town of Meiwa, Taki District, Mie Prefecture, Japan, operated by the private railway operator Kintetsu Railway. The station has the Inspection Center for the Yamada Line, the Toba Line and the Shima Line.

== Lines ==
Myōjō Station is served by the Yamada Line, and is located 19.8 rail kilometers from the terminus of the line at Ise-Nakagawa Station.

== Station layout ==
The station was consists of two island platforms connected by a level crossing, serving 2 tracks each. Tracks (Platforms) 2 and 4 are main tracks and Tracks (Platforms) 1 and 3 are refuge tracks to allow for the passage of express trains.

=== Platforms ===
1, 2	■ Yamada Line	for Ujiyamada, Toba and Kashikojima
3, 4	■ Yamada Line	for Ise-Nakagawa

- The first train for Ise-Nakagawa (through to Nabari on the Osaka Line) departs from Track (Platform) 1.

== Adjacent stations ==
«	Service	»
Yamada Line
Saikū	Local	Akeno

== History ==
Myōjō Station opened on March 27, 1930 as a station on the Sangu Kyuko Electric Railway. On March 15, 1941, the line merged with Osaka Electric Railway to become a station on Kansai Kyuko Railway's Yamada Line. This line in turn was merged with the Nankai Electric Railway on June 1, 1944 to form Kintetsu.

== Passenger statistics ==
In fiscal 2019, the station was used by an average of 646 passengers daily (boarding passengers only).

== Surrounding area ==
- Kintetsu Myōjō Train Inspection Center
- Myojo Elementary School
- Mizuike Pottery Kiln ruins
