= Obata Station (Mie) =

Railway station in Ise, Mie Prefecture, Japan

Obata Station 小俣駅
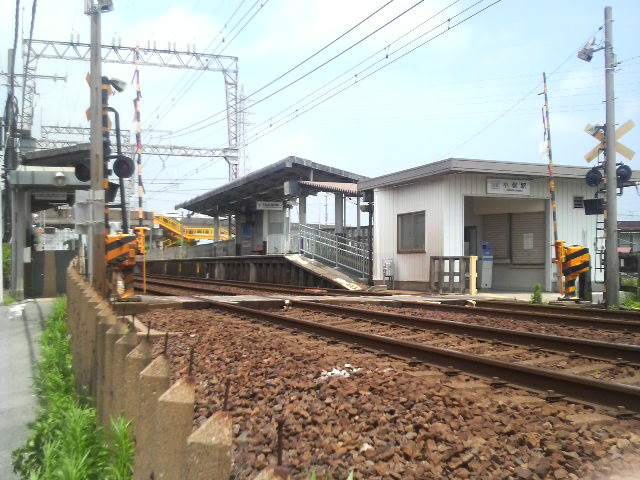
- Obata Station in 2008

General information
- Location: 8254-5 Motomachi, Obata-cho, Ise-shi, Mie-ken; Japan
- Coordinates: 34°30′46″N 136°41′07″E
- Operator: Kintetsu Railway
- Line: Yamada Line
- Distance: 24.2 km from Ise-Nakagawa
- Platforms: 2 side platforms
- Connections: Bus terminal

Other information
- Station code: M71
- Website: Official website

History
- Opened: July 24, 1931

Passengers
- FY2019: 370 daily
Location
- Location within Mie Prefecture Location within Japan

Obata Station (小俣駅, Obata-eki) is a passenger railway station in located in the city of Ise, Mie Prefecture, Japan, operated by the private railway operator Kintetsu Railway.

== Lines ==
Obata Station is served by the Yamada Line, and is located 24.2 rail kilometers from the starting point of the line at Ujiyamada Station.

== Station layout ==
The station was consists of two opposed side platforms, connected by a level crossing. The station is unattended.

=== Platforms ===
1	■ Yamada Line	for Ujiyamada, Toba and Kashikojima
2	■ Yamada Line	for Ise-Nakagawa

== Adjacent stations ==
«	Service	»
Yamada Line
Akeno	Local	Miyamachi

.

== History ==
Obata Station opened on July 24, 1931, as a station on the Sangu Kyuko Electric Railway. On March 15, 1941, the line merged with Osaka Electric Railway to become a station on Kansai Kyuko Railway's Yamada Line. This line in turn was merged with the Nankai Electric Railway on June 1, 1944, to form Kintetsu. The station was renamed to its present name in March 1933. The station has been unattended since February 21, 2005.

== Passenger statistics ==
In fiscal 2019, the station was used by an average of 370 passengers daily (boarding passengers only).

== Surrounding area ==
- Miya River
- Ise-Shima Wholesale Market

== See also ==
- List of railway stations in Japan
