= Miya River =

Miya River may refer to:

- Miya River (Mie), a major river in Mie Prefecture, Japan
- Jinzū River, a major river in Gifu and Toyama prefectures that is often called the "Miya River"
- Agano River, a river which flows from Fukushima Prefecture to Niigata Prefecture that is often called the "Miya River"
