= Akeno Station =

Railway station in Ise, Mie Prefecture, Japan

Akeno Station 明野駅
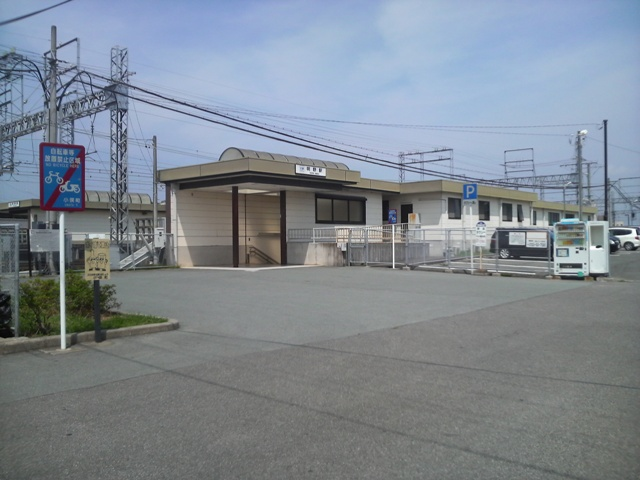
- Akeno Station in 2008

General information
- Location: 5285-1 Akeno, Obata-cho, Ise-shi, Mie-ken 519-0501; Japan
- Coordinates: 34.5214°N 136.6691°E
- Operator: Kintetsu Railway
- Line: Yamada Line
- Distance: 22.4 km from Ise-Nakagawa
- Platforms: 2 side platforms
- Connections: Bus terminal

Other information
- Station code: M70
- Website: Official website

History
- Opened: March 27, 1930

Passengers
- FY2019: 1149 daily
Location
- Location within Mie Prefecture Location within Japan

Akeno Station (明野駅, Akeno-eki) is a passenger railway station located in the city of Ise, Mie Prefecture, Japan, operated by the private railway operator Kintetsu Railway.

== Lines ==
Akeno Station is served by the Yamada Line, and is located 22.4 rail kilometers from the starting point of the line at Ujiyamada Station.

== Station layout ==
The station consists of two opposed side platforms, connected by an underpass crossing. The station is unattended.

=== Platforms ===
1	■ Yamada Line	for Ujiyamada, Toba and Kashikojima
2	■ Yamada Line	for Ise-Nakagawa

== Adjacent stations ==
«	Service	»
Yamada Line
Myōjō	Local	Obata

== History ==
Akeno Station opened on March 27, 1930, as a station on the Sangu Kyuko Electric Railway. On March 15, 1941, the line merged with Osaka Electric Railway to become a station on Kansai Kyuko Railway's Yamada Line. This line, in turn, was merged with the Nankai Electric Railway on June 1, 1944, to form Kintetsu. A new station building was completed in March 1992.

== Passenger statistics ==
In fiscal 2019, the station was used by an average of 1149 passengers daily (boarding passengers only).

== Surrounding area ==
- Akeno High School
- Japan Ground Self-Defense Force (JGSDF) Aviation School

== See also ==
- List of railway stations in Japan
