= Kushida Station =

Railway station in Matsusaka, Mie Prefecture, Japan

Kushida Station 櫛田駅
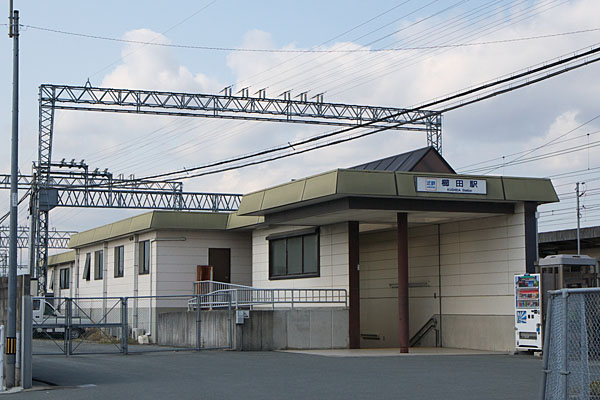
- Kushida Station

General information
- Location: 1131-5 Toyohara-cho, Matsusaka-shi, Mie-ken 515-0205; Japan
- Coordinates: 34.5489°N 136.5832°E
- Operator: Kintetsu Railway
- Line: Yamada Line
- Distance: 13.9 km from Ise-Nakagawa
- Platforms: 2 side platforms
- Connections: Bus terminal

Other information
- Station code: M66
- Website: Official website

History
- Opened: March 27, 1930

Passengers
- FY2019: 672 daily
Location
- Location within Mie Prefecture Location within Japan

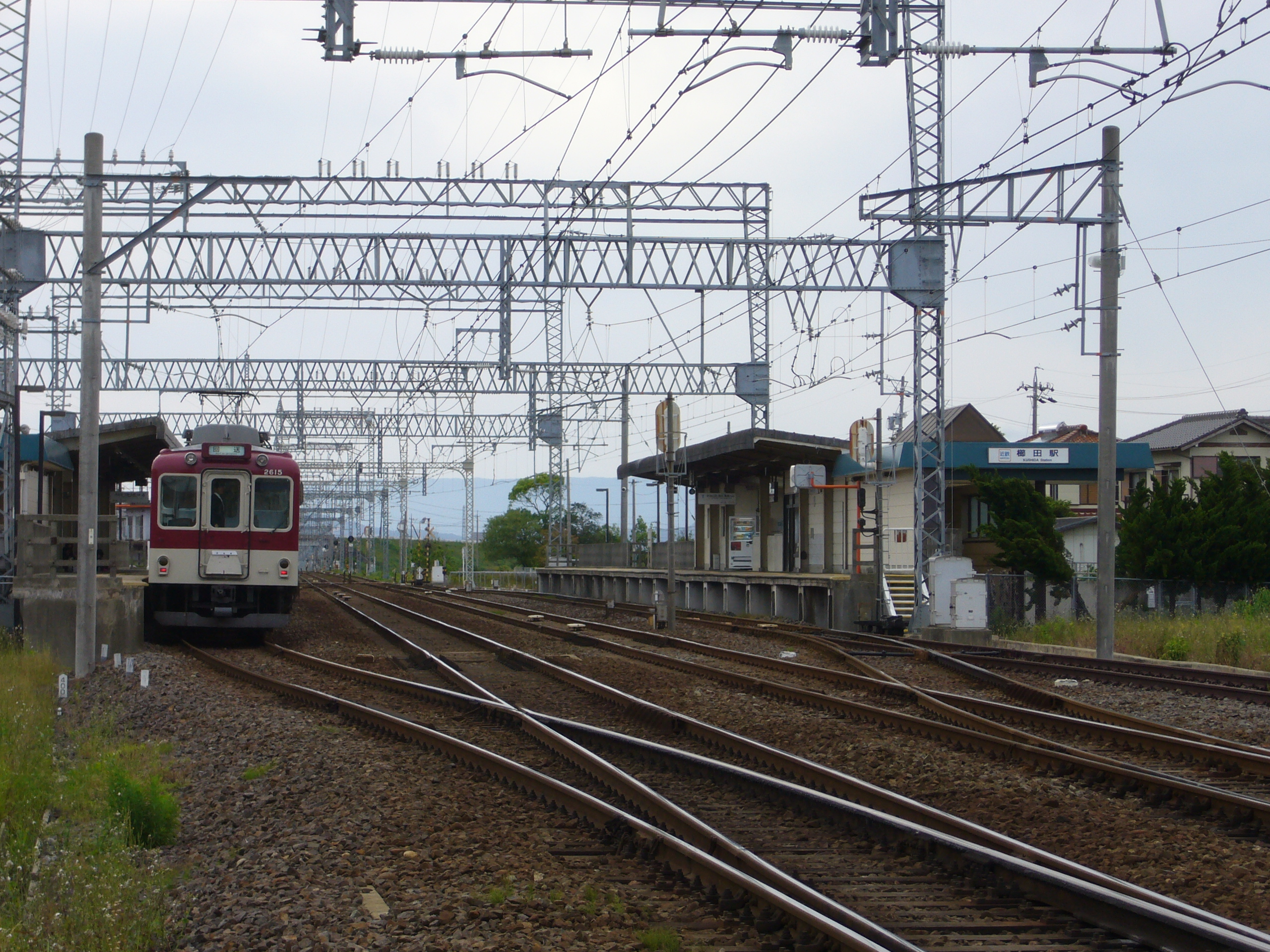
appearance of Kushida station platform

Kushida Station (櫛田駅, Kushida-eki) is a passenger railway station located in the city of Matsusaka, Mie Prefecture, Japan, operated by the private railway operator Kintetsu Railway.

== Lines ==
Kushida Station is served by the Yamada Line and is located 13.9 kilometers from the line's terminus at Ise-Nakagawa Station.

== Station layout ==
The station consists of two side platforms and four tracks. Local trains use side tracks (Tracks 1 and 4). Through trains which do not stop at this station use center tracks (Tracks 2 and 3).. The station is staffed.

=== Platforms ===
1	■ Yamada Line	for Ujiyamada, Toba and Kashikojima
4	■ Yamada Line	for Ise-Nakagawa

== Adjacent stations ==
«	Service	»
Yamada Line
Higashi-Matsusaka	Local	Koishiro
Express: Does not stop at this station
Rapid Express: Does not stop at this station

== History ==
Kushida Station opened on March 27, 1930 as a station on the Sangu Kyuko Electric Railway. On March 15, 1941, the line merged with Osaka Electric Railway to become a station on Kansai Kyuko Railway's Yamada Line. This line in turn was merged with the Nankai Electric Railway on June 1, 1944 to form Kintetsu. A new station building was completed in March 1992.

== Passenger statistics ==
In fiscal 2019, the station was used by an average of 672 passengers daily (boarding passengers only).

== Surrounding area ==
- Kushida River
- Kushida Shrine
- Mie Prefectural Matsusaka Commercial High School

== See also ==
- List of railway stations in Japan
