= Shun Morishita =

Japanese footballer

Shun Morishita 森下 俊
Personal information
- Full name: Shun Morishita
- Date of birth: 11 May 1986 (age 40)
- Place of birth: Ise, Mie, Japan
- Height: 1.78 m (5 ft 10 in)
- Position: Centre back

Team information
- Current team: Iwate Grulla Morioka
- Number: 35

Youth career
- 2002–2004: Júbilo Iwata

Senior career*
Years	Team	Apps	(Gls)
2005–2008	Júbilo Iwata	4	(0)
2009–2011	Kyoto Sanga	68	(0)
2012–2015	Kawasaki Frontale	12	(0)
2013	→ Yokohama FC (loan)	23	(0)
2014–2015	→ Júbilo Iwata (loan)	38	(1)
2016–2019	Júbilo Iwata	100	(2)
2020–	Iwate Grulla Morioka	2	(0)
Medal record
Kyoto Sanga FC
Runner-up	Emperor's Cup	2011
- * Club domestic league appearances and goals as of 11:45, 7 July 2020 (UTC)

Shun Morishita (森下 俊, Shun Morishita; born 11 May 1986 in Ise, Mie) is a Japanese football player currently playing for Iwate Grulla Morioka.

== Career statistics ==
Updated to 19 February 2019.

Club performance			League		Cup		League Cup		Continental		Total	
Season	Club	League	Apps	Goals	Apps	Goals	Apps	Goals	Apps	Goals	Apps	Goals
Japan			League		Emperor's Cup		League Cup		Asia		Total	
2005	Júbilo Iwata	J1 League	1	0	0	0	1	0	1	0	3	0
2006	Júbilo Iwata	J1 League	2	0	0	0	2	0	-		4	0
2007	Júbilo Iwata	J1 League	0	0	0	0	0	0	-		0	0
2008	Júbilo Iwata	J1 League	1	0	1	0	1	0	-		3	0
2009	Kyoto Sanga F.C.	J1 League	9	0	2	0	1	0	-		12	0
2010	Kyoto Sanga F.C.	J1 League	28	0	2	0	4	0	-		34	0
2011	Kyoto Sanga F.C.	J2 League	31	0	5	0	-		-		36	0
2012	Kawasaki Frontale	J1 League	12	0	0	0	4	0	-		16	0
2013	Yokohama FC	J2 League	23	0	1	0	-		-		24	0
2014	Júbilo Iwata	J2 League	20	1	1	0	-		-		21	1
2015	Júbilo Iwata	J2 League	18	0	0	0	-		-		18	0
2016	Júbilo Iwata	J1 League	26	0	0	0	0	0	–		26	0
2017	Júbilo Iwata	J1 League	29	1	0	0	1	0	–		30	1
2018	Júbilo Iwata	J1 League	6	0	3	0	4	0	–		13	0
Career total			206	2	15	0	18	0	1	0	240	2
