= El Teatro de Danza Contemporanea de El Salvador =

El Teatro de Danza Contemporanea de El Salvador (TDC), is a contemporary dance company based in Washington, DC, United States. It is a non-profit institution in residence at Joy of Motion Dance Center. Its youth leadership program was formerly based at Centro Nia. It was led in 2007 by Miya Hisaka Silva.

== Repertoire ==
- Esperanza (Hope)
- Retazos de Vida (Fragments of Life)
- Declaracione
- Recordando El Silencio (Remembering the Silence)
- Rincon de mi Alma (Corner of my Spirit)
- Stabat Mater
- Concierto
