= Seta River (Mie) =

River in Ise, Mie Prefecture, Japan

Coordinates: 34°30′52″N 136°44′26″E

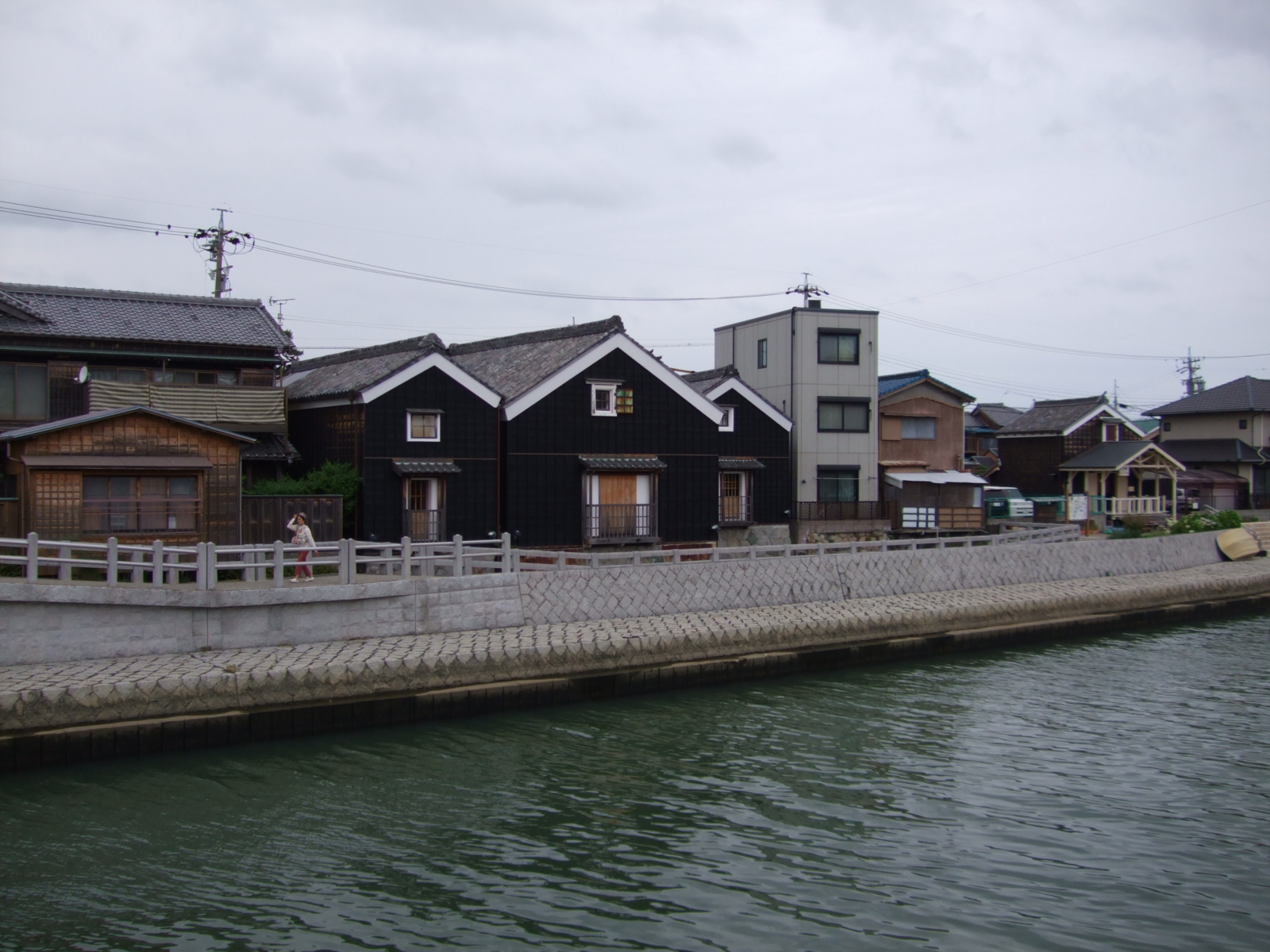
- Seta River and Kawasaki Area

- Location within Japan

Location
- Country: Japan
- Prefecture: Mie Prefecture
- City: Ise

Physical characteristics
- Source
  - location: Ise, Mie Prefecture, Japan
- Mouth
  - location: Ise, Mie Prefecture, Japan

The Seta River (勢田川, Seta-gawa) is a river that has both its source and its mouth in the city of Ise, Mie Prefecture, Japan. It flows through the heart of Ise. In 1980, it was designated the most polluted river in Mie, however it no longer holds this status due to cleanup efforts by the city of Ise.

== Course ==
- Mie Prefecture
- Ise
