= Miyan =

Miyan may refer to:

- Miyan (surname), a rajput caste of the North India
- Miyan people, an ethnic group of Australia
- Miyan language, a language of Australia
- Mian, Punjab, a village in India
- MIYAN (cryptocurrency), a memecoin

== See also ==
- Mian (disambiguation)
- Miya (disambiguation)
