= Miya Hisaka Silva =

Miya Hisaka Silva is the founder and director of El Teatro de Danza Contemporanea de El Salvador. Miya is the producer and director, teacher, dancer, choreographer, international presenter and city-planner. She has worked in El Salvador, Mexico, Guatemala, Nicaragua, Dominican Republic, France, Italy, England, Jordan, Thailand, China, Canada and throughout the United States.

Former Founder/Director of the D.C. Contemporary Dance Theatre, Washington, DC’s first multicultural dance company selected as cultural ambassadors by USIS to represent the United States for a world tour for a decade. Her work has been commissioned by The Kennedy Center, The Smithsonian Institution, The Central American Olympics, The Washington School of Ballet, The Loudoun Ballet, The Ministry of Education of El Salvador, Georgetown and Santa Clara University, The Catholic University of America, University of San Francisco’s Jesuit Foundation, among others.

Originally trained by Alvin Ailey, Martha Graham, Erick Hawkins, Gloria Contreras, Gene Hill Sagan, Alex Martin and Maureen Basta. Worked extensively with Rod Rodgers, Kevin Iega Jeff, Lloyd Whitmore, Adrain Bolton, Juan Carlos Rincones, among others. Holds a BA in Urban Studies from Columbia University and an MPA from the Maxwell School of Citizenship and Public Affairs/Syracuse University.

Has served on Washington’s Mayor’s Task Force for Arts and Economic Development in the restoration of the Gallery Row and 14th St. Arts Districts; a Public Service Fellow to the Maxwell School; an Arts Fellow at the National Endowment for the Arts; and recipient of the Mayor’s Arts Award of Excellence in 1986. Has been awarded numerous grants from the National Endowment for the Arts, DC Commission on the Arts and Humanities, the Inter-American Development Bank, Agnes & Eugene Meyer Foundation, among others. Former faculty at the Washington School of Ballet, George Washington University, University of Toronto, and in El Salvador, at the National School of Dance “Morena Celarié”, former Director of the dance program at Georgetown University, the Central American University “Jose Simeon Canas”, and creator of El Centro para Liderazgo en las Artes. Has taught at Alonzo King's’s San Francisco Dance Center, The Marin Dance Theatre, The University of San Francisco, and Stage Dor Performance Space, CA. Currently on faculty at The Catholic University of America in Washington, D.C., and The Joy of Motion Dance Center, WDC.
