= Yamada Line (Kintetsu) =

Railway line in Japan

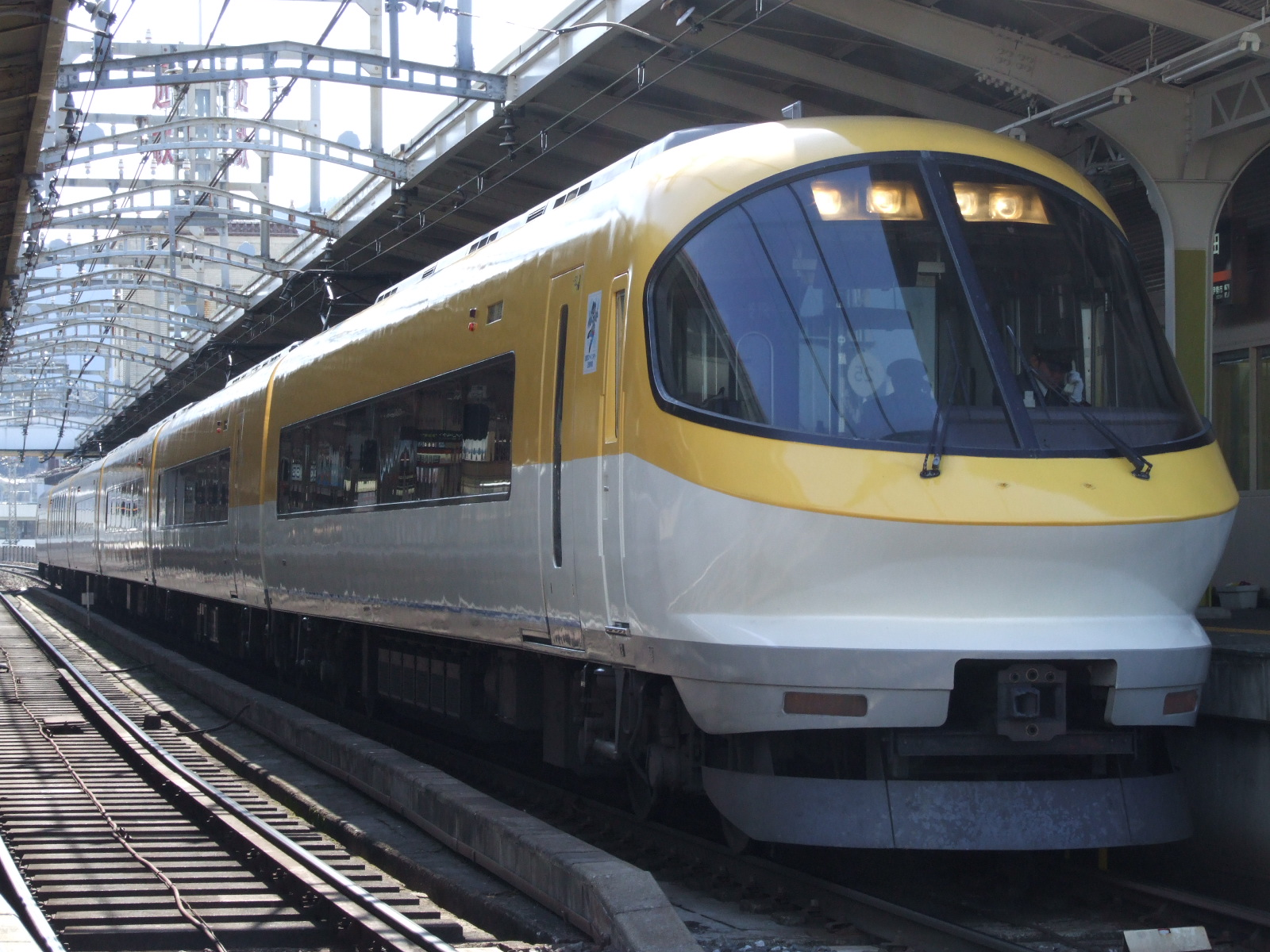
- Kintetsu Ise-Shima Liner at Ujiyamada

Overview
- Owner: Kintetsu Railway
- Locale: Mie Prefecture
- Termini: Ise-Nakagawa; Ujiyamada
- Stations: 14

Service
- Type: Commuter rail
- System: Kintetsu Railway
- Operator(s): Kintetsu Railway

History
- Opened: 27 March 1930; 95 years ago
- Last extension: 17 March 1931; 94 years ago

Technical
- Line length: 28.3 km (17.6 mi)
- Number of tracks: Double-track
- Track gauge: 1,435 mm (4 ft 8 1/2 in) standard gauge
- Electrification: 1,500 V DC (overhead line)
- Operating speed: 130 km/h (81 mph)
- Signalling: Automatic closed block
- Train protection system: Kintetsu ATS

The Yamada Line (山田線, Yamada-sen) is a railway line of the Japanese private railway company Kintetsu Railway, connecting Ise-Nakagawa Station (Matsusaka, Mie) and Ujiyamada Station (Ise, Mie) in Japan. The line runs parallel to parts of the JR Central Kisei Main Line and Sangū Line.

The line connects with the Toba Line at Ujiyamada Station. The Yamada Line, Toba Line, and Shima Line form a single train line that begins at Ise-Nakagawa Station and serves the Ise-Shima tourist region.

In 1941 when the line received its name, the city of Ise was called Ujiyamada and was actually a merger of two towns formerly called Uji and Yamada. The heart of the old town of Yamada was near modern-day Ujiyamada Station, the terminus, and thus the line was named the "Yamada Line".

== Services ==
LO Local (普通; futsū)

For Ise-Nakagawa
For Ujiyamada, Toba, Kashikojima
(Locals stop at every station.)

EX Express (急行; kyūkō)

For Osaka Uehommachi; via Nabari and Yamato-Yagi (Kashihara)
For Nagoya; via Tsu and Yokkaichi
For Matsusaka, Ujiyamada, Isuzugawa, Toba
(Typically ends at Ujiyamada and Isuzugawa.)

RE Rapid Express (快速急行; kaisoku-kyūkō)

For Osaka Uehommachi; via Nabari and Yamato-Yagi (Kashihara)
For Matsusaka, Ujiyamada, Toba
(Only runs mornings and evenings.)
(Typically ends at Ujiyamada and Isuzugawa.)

LE Limited Express (特急; tokkyū)

For Osaka Namba and Osaka Uehommachi; via Nabari and Yamato-Yagi (Kashihara)
For Kyoto; via Yamato-Saidaiji (Nara)
For Nagoya; via Tsu and Yokkaichi
For Matsusaka, Ujiyamada, Toba, Kashikojima
(Seat reservations and limited express fee required.)

NS Non-stop Limited Express (ノンストップ特急; nonsutoppu tokkyū)

For Osaka Namba
For Nagoya
For Kashikojima
(Runs twice a day on weekends.)
(Seat reservations and limited express fee required.)

SV Premium Express Shimakaze (しまかぜ; Shimakaze)

For Osaka Namba
For Kyoto
For Nagoya
For Kashikojima
(Train to and from Osaka runs once a day except on Tuesday with some exceptions.)
(Train to and from Kyoto runs once a day except on Wednesday with some exceptions.)
(Train to and from Nagoya runs once a day except on Thursday with some exceptions.)
(Seat reservations, limited express fee and "Shimakaze" special vehicle fee required.)

== Stations ==
Legend
| ● | Trains stop here |
| ○ | Trains stop here sometimes |
| | | Trains do not stop here |

| No. | Station | | Distance (km) | Transfers | LO | EX | RE | LE | NS | SV | Location | |
|---|---|---|---|---|---|---|---|---|---|---|---|---|
| M61 | Ise-Nakagawa | 伊勢中川 | 0.0 | D Osaka Line; E Nagoya Line | ● | ● | ● | ● | | | | | Matsusaka | Mie Prefecture |
| M62 | Ise-Nakahara | 伊勢中原 | 3.0 | | ● | | | | | | | | | | | Matsusaka | Mie Prefecture |
| M63 | Matsugasaki | 松ヶ崎 | 5.7 | | ● | | | | | | | | | | | Matsusaka | Mie Prefecture |
| M64 | Matsusaka | 松阪 | 8.4 | Kisei Main Line; Meishō Line | ● | ● | ● | ● | | | | | Matsusaka | Mie Prefecture |
| M65 | Higashi-Matsusaka | 東松阪 | 10.0 | | ● | | | | | | | | | | | Matsusaka | Mie Prefecture |
| M66 | Kushida | 櫛田 | 13.9 | | ● | | | | | | | | | | | Matsusaka | Mie Prefecture |
| M67 | Koishiro | 漕代 | 15.8 | | ● | | | | | | | | | | | Matsusaka | Mie Prefecture |
| M68 | Saikū | 斎宮 | 17.1 | | ● | | | | | | | | | | | Meiwa | Mie Prefecture |
| M69 | Myōjō | 明星 | 19.8 | | ● | | | | | | | | | | | Meiwa | Mie Prefecture |
| M70 | Akeno | 明野 | 22.4 | | ● | | | | | | | | | | | Ise | Mie Prefecture |
| M71 | Obata | 小俣 | 24.2 | | ● | | | | | | | | | | | Ise | Mie Prefecture |
| M72 | Miyamachi | 宮町 | 26.3 | | ● | ○ | | | | | | | | | Ise | Mie Prefecture |
| M73 | Iseshi | 伊勢市 | 27.7 | Sangū Line | ● | ● | ● | ● | ● | ● | Ise | Mie Prefecture |
| M74 | Ujiyamada | 宇治山田 | 28.3 | M Toba Line | ● | ● | ● | ● | ● | ● | Ise | Mie Prefecture |

== History ==
The Yamada Line was built in the late 1920s and early 1930s to provide a more direct link for pilgrims and travelers going between Osaka and Ise Grand Shrine in Ujiyamada (now Ise) and was designed to compete with the Japanese National Railways Sangū Line (now owned by JR Central).

=== Sankyū Main Line ===
Originally built and operated by Sangū Express Electric Railway (Sankyū) the line was designed to link directly with what is now the Osaka Line. However, at that time the Osaka Line, which was operated under a different name by Osaka Electric Railroad (Daiki), only ran to Sakurai and Sankyū managed the section from Sakurai to Ujiyamada; this railway was known as the Sankyū Main Line (参急本線, Sankyū-honsen).

During the construction of the easternmost section of the Sankyū Main Line (most of what is now the Yamada Line), another private railway company, Ise Electric Railway (Iseden), was constructing another line right alongside that would eventually link with Nagoya and was known as the Iseden Main Line. The two lines opened within just a few weeks of each other in 1930 which led to there being three parallel lines (the third being the Sangū Line) owned by three different companies running between Matsusaka and Ujiyamada. Sankyū and Iseden pledged to work together to ensure they both prospered, however both companies soon began a merger struggle and, in 1936, Sankyū won the battle and acquired Iseden and its lines. The Iseden Main Line became known as the Sankyū Ise Line.

Sankyū now owned two lines that both terminated in Ujiyamada: The Main Line which ran west towards Osaka and the Ise Line which ran north to Kuwana with plans for an extension to Nagoya. However, the last 20 km (12 mi) of both lines closely paralleled each other, so Sankyū developed a plan to utilize one of these two sets of tracks to provide service to both Osaka and Nagoya and to phase out and eventually close the other. It was decided that the Sankyū Main Line was the better line for this task and that Sankyū-Nakagawa Station (now Ise-Nakagawa) would serve as the three-way meeting point of trains bound for Osaka, Nagoya, and Ujiyamada. This plan became a reality within just a couple of years; the Ise Line was extended northeast to Nagoya and a new track connecting the Ise Line (at Edobashi) to Sankyū-Nakagawa was completed (this would later become the Kintetsu Nagoya Line). Once this major change took place, ridership on the Matsusaka ~ Ujiyamada section of the Main Line became significantly higher and the parallel section of the Ise Line was closed in 1942.

=== Yamada Line ===
In 1941, Sankyū and its parent company Daiki merged to form Kansai Kyuko Railway (Kankyū), the precursor to Kintetsu. Before this merger, the Sankyū Main Line had originated at Sakurai and terminated at Ujiyamada, however after the merger the various lines were combined and renamed, resulting in the section between Sakurai and Ise-Nakagawa, along with part of Daiki's lines, becoming the Osaka Line and the section between Ise-Nakagawa and Ujiyamada becoming the Yamada Line, as it is today. In 1944, following mergers with other Kansai area railway companies, Kankyū became Kintetsu and the line came under its current ownership and name. Although the city of Ujiyamada (the basis for the name "Yamada Line") changed its name to Ise in 1955, the train line still maintains the same name to this day.

Even though Kintetsu owned both the Nagoya Line and the Yamada Line, direct service between Nagoya and Ujiyamada was not possible because the Sankyū Main Line (Yamada Line) was built using a railway gauge of 1,435 mm (4 ft 8 1/2 in) standard gauge, however the Sankyū Ise Line (Nagoya Line) was built using a gauge of 1,067 mm (3 ft 6 in), so it was necessary for passengers to change trains at Ise-Nakagawa. However, in September 1959, the Nagoya Line suffered severe damage due to the Ise-wan Typhoon and while repairing the line, Kintetsu widened the gauge of the entire line to 1,435 mm so that express trains could travel directly from Nagoya to Ujiyamada without changing; this service began in early 1960.

Direct service from both Osaka and Nagoya was extended from Ujiyamada to Kashikojima in 1970 with the opening of the Toba Line which provided a connection between Ujiyamada at the end of the Yamada Line and Toba at the beginning of the then-isolated Shima Line.

=== Timeline ===
- March 27, 1930 - Matsusaka ~ Gekū-mae (now Miyamachi) section opens. Line is operated by Sangū Express Electric Railway (Sankyū)
- May 18, 1930 - Sankyū-Nakagawa (now Ise-Nakagawa) ~ Matsusaka section opens.
- September 21, 1930 - Gekū-mae ~ Yamada (now Iseshi) section opens.
- March 17, 1931 - Yamada ~ Ujiyamada section opens. Sankyū Main Line officially completed. Direct service between Osaka (via what is now the Osaka Line) and Ujiyamada begins.
- July 4, 1931 - Obata Station opens.
- March 1, 1933 - Gekū-mae Station officially renamed Miyamachi Station.
- September 15, 1936 - Sankyū acquires Ise Electric Railway (Iseden) and all of its lines. Iseden Main Line is officially renamed Sankyū Ise Line.
- November 3, 1937 - Sankyū-Matsue Station closed. Matsugasaki Station becomes the intersecting station between the Sankyū Main Line and the Sankyū Ise Line.
- March 15, 1941 - Osaka Electric Railroad (Daiki) and Sankyū merge to form Kansai Express Railway (Kankyū). Sankyū-Nakagawa Station officially renamed to Ise-Nakagawa Station. Sankyū-Nakahara Station officially renamed to Ise-Nakahara. Ise-Nakagawa ~ Ujiyamada section officially named Kankyū Yamada Line.
- August 11, 1942 - Ise Line: Shin-Matsusaka ~ Daijingū-mae (Ise Grand Shrine) section closes.
- October 23, 1943 - Koishiro Station opens.
- June 1, 1944 - Kankyū becomes Kinki Nippon Railway (Kintetsu). Line officially renamed Kintetsu Yamada Line.
- July 15, 1959 - Yamada Station officially renamed Iseshi Station.
- January 20, 1960 - Direct service between Nagoya and Ujiyamada begins.
- March 1, 1968 - ATS system activated on entire line.
- March 12, 1992 - Passing tracks for express trains open at Kushida Station.
- March 14, 1992 - Passing tracks for express trains open at Akeno Station.
- March 18, 2004 - One man (conductor-less) train service begins.

=== Former connecting lines ===
- Matsugasaki station - the Ise Electric Railway 39 km (24 mi) 1067mm gauge line to Daijingumae connected here, opened between 1926 and 1930, and closed between 1943 and 1961.
- Matsusaka Station: Mie Kotsu operated 20 km (12 mi) 762 mm line to Oishi between 1912 and 1964. The line was electrified at 600 V DC in 1927, although steam locomotives continued to be used until 1938.
