= Ise, Mie =

Ise 伊勢市
- City
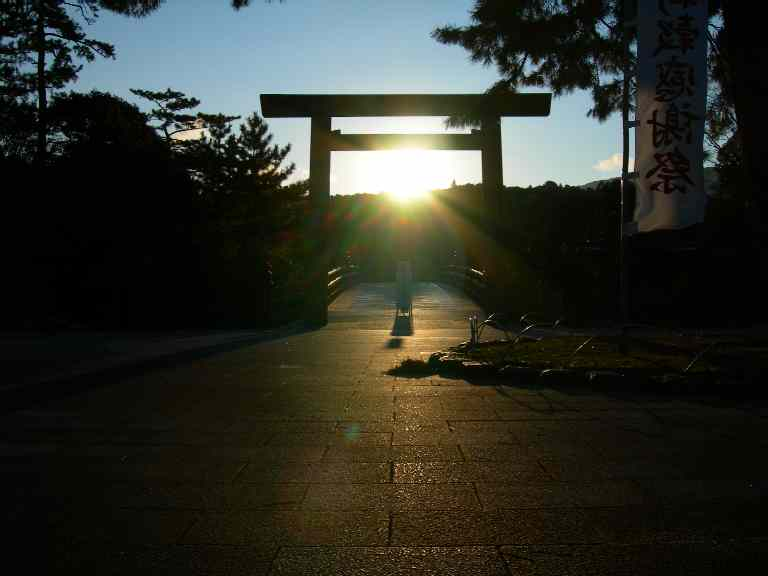
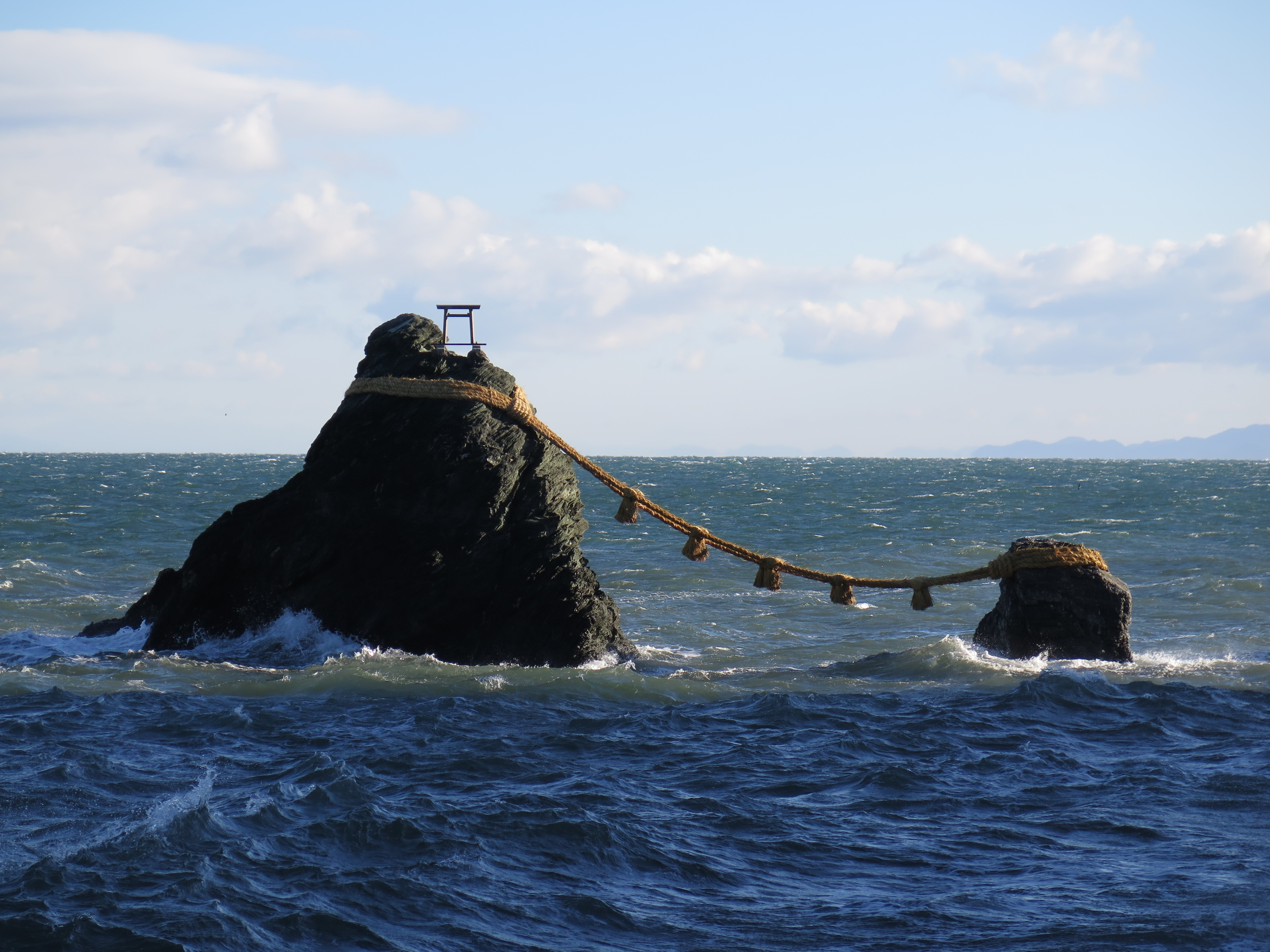
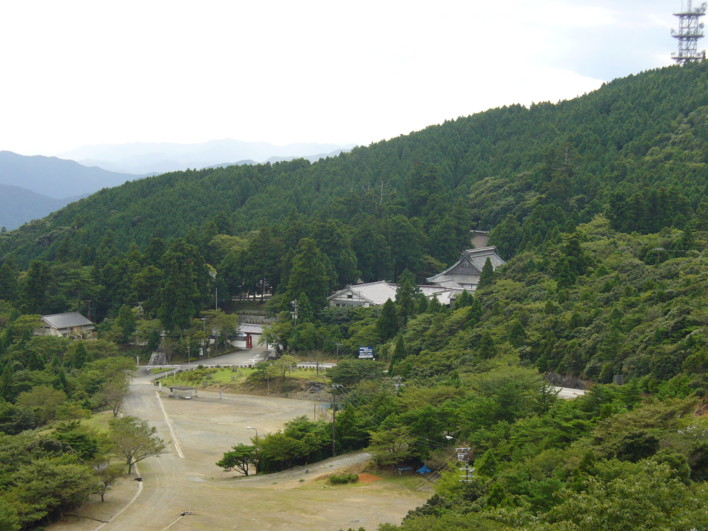
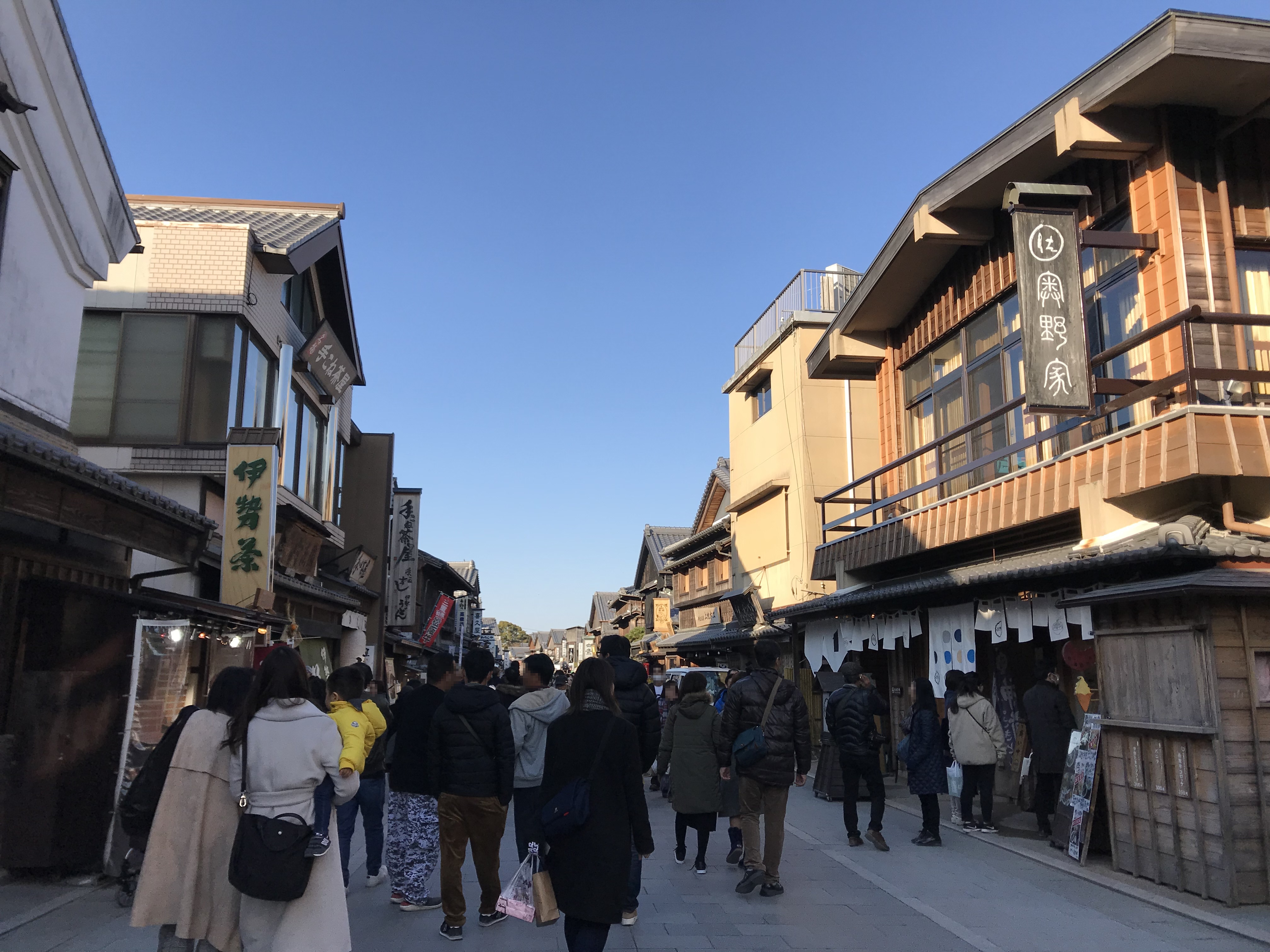
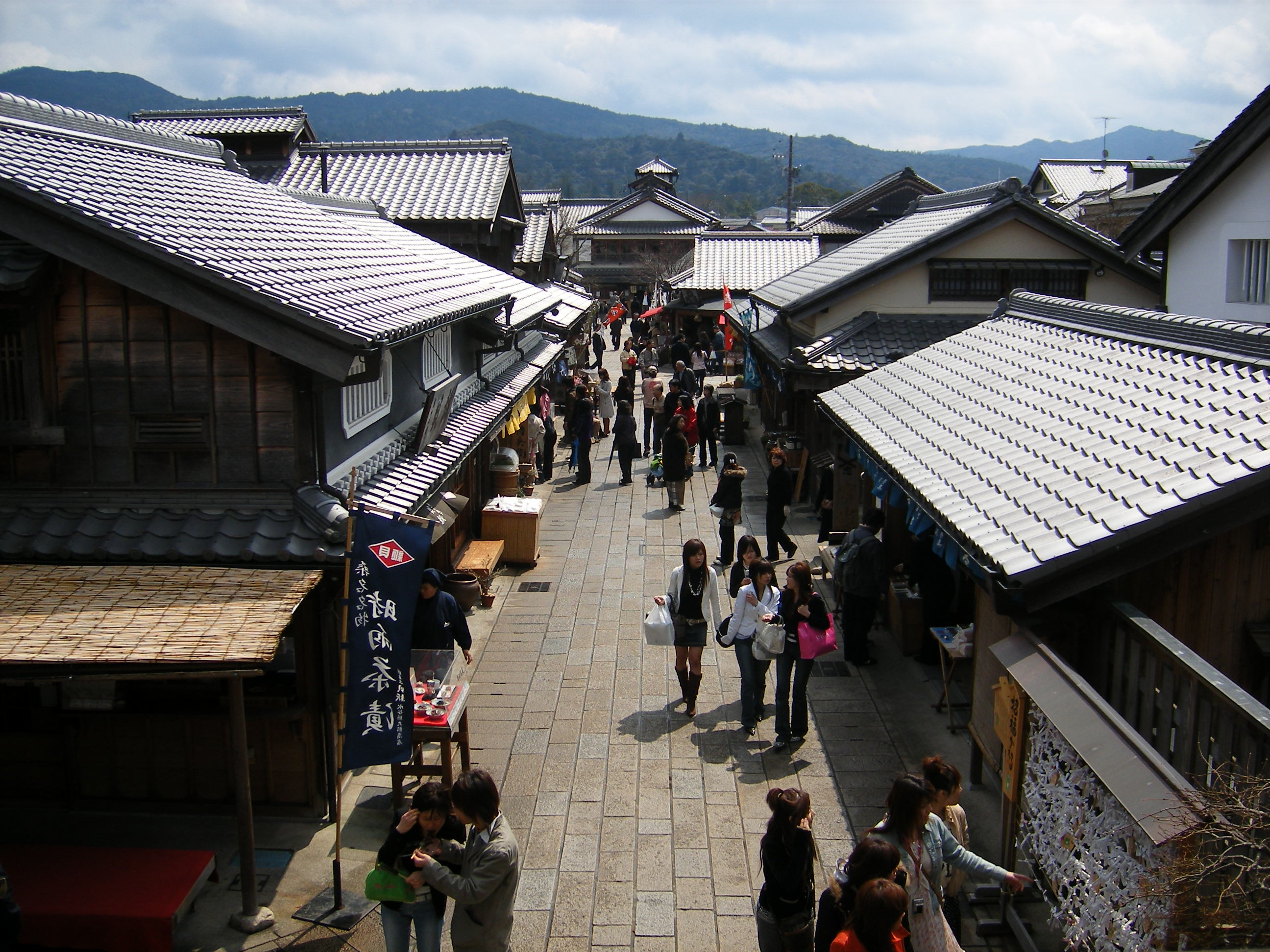
- From top, left to right: Ise Grand Shrine, Wedded Rocks, Kongōshō Temple, Oharaimachi, and Okage Yokocho

- Flag Seal
- Interactive map of Ise
- Coordinates: 34°29′N 136°43′E
- Country: Japan
- Region: Kansai
- Prefecture: Mie
- As Uji-Yamada city: September 1, 1906
- As Ise city: January 1, 1955

Government
  - Mayor: Ken'ichi Suzuki

Area
  - Total: 208.52 km^{2} (80.51 sq mi)

Population (July 2021)
  - Total: 123,533
  - Density: 592.43/km^{2} (1,534.4/sq mi)
- Time zone: UTC+9 (Japan Standard Time)
- Phone number: 0596-23-1111
- Address: 1-7-29 Iwabuchi, Ise-shi, Mie-ken 516-0037
- Climate: Cfa
- Website: Official website
- Symbols
- Flower: Oyane-zakura
- Tree: Michelia compressa

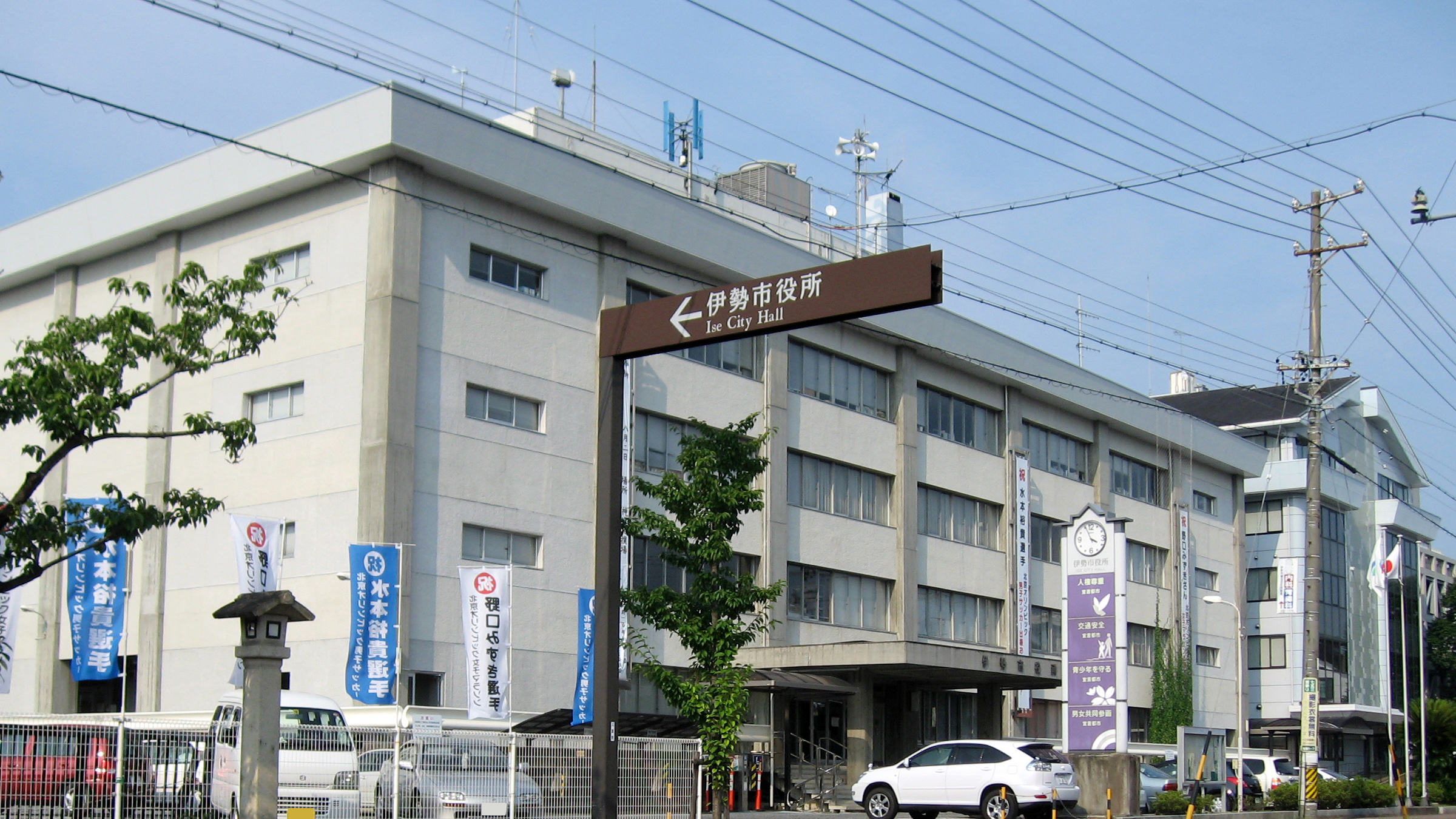
Ise City Hall

Ise (伊勢市, Ise-shi; Japanese pronunciation: [í.sè̞, ì.sé̞.ɕì]), formerly called Ujiyamada (宇治山田), is a city in central Mie Prefecture, on the island of Honshū, Japan. Ise is home to Ise Grand Shrine, the most sacred Shintō shrine in Japan. The city has a long-standing title – Shinto (神都) – that roughly means "the Holy City", and literally means "the Capital of the Kami". As of 31 July 2021, the city had an estimated population of 123,533 in 55,911 households and a population density of 590 people per km^{2}. The total area of the city is 208.53 square kilometres (80.51 sq mi).

== Geography ==
Ise is located on the northern half of Shima Peninsula in far eastern Mie Prefecture. The northern part of the city is flat land and faces Ise Bay on the Pacific Ocean. In the south, the land rises to form hills and mountains with an elevation of 100 to 500 meters. Most of the city is within the geographic limits of Ise-Shima National Park.

=== Climate ===
Ise has a humid subtropical climate (Köppen Cfa) characterized by warm summers and cool winters with light to no snowfall. The average annual temperature in Ise is 15.6 °C (60.1 °F). The average annual rainfall is 1,870.8 mm (73.65 in), with September as the wettest month. The temperatures are highest on average in August, at around 27.2 °C (81.0 °F), and lowest in January, at around 4.8 °C (40.6 °F).

Climate data for Obata, Ise (1991−2020 normals, extremes 1979−present)
Month	Jan	Feb	Mar	Apr	May	Jun	Jul	Aug	Sep	Oct	Nov	Dec	Year
Record high °C (°F)	18.1 (64.6)	20.5 (68.9)	25.3 (77.5)	30.7 (87.3)	33.1 (91.6)	36.0 (96.8)	39.1 (102.4)	38.8 (101.8)	37.8 (100.0)	30.4 (86.7)	25.6 (78.1)	25.4 (77.7)	39.1 (102.4)
Mean daily maximum °C (°F)	9.5 (49.1)	10.2 (50.4)	13.8 (56.8)	19.4 (66.9)	24.0 (75.2)	26.8 (80.2)	31.0 (87.8)	32.2 (90.0)	28.3 (82.9)	22.7 (72.9)	17.1 (62.8)	11.9 (53.4)	20.6 (69.0)
Daily mean °C (°F)	4.8 (40.6)	5.2 (41.4)	8.5 (47.3)	13.8 (56.8)	18.7 (65.7)	22.2 (72.0)	26.3 (79.3)	27.2 (81.0)	23.7 (74.7)	17.9 (64.2)	12.1 (53.8)	7.0 (44.6)	15.6 (60.1)
Mean daily minimum °C (°F)	0.2 (32.4)	0.5 (32.9)	3.3 (37.9)	8.4 (47.1)	13.9 (57.0)	18.4 (65.1)	22.6 (72.7)	23.4 (74.1)	19.9 (67.8)	13.6 (56.5)	7.2 (45.0)	2.2 (36.0)	11.1 (52.0)
Record low °C (°F)	−5.7 (21.7)	−6.0 (21.2)	−3.9 (25.0)	−1.8 (28.8)	4.8 (40.6)	10.0 (50.0)	15.7 (60.3)	16.0 (60.8)	10.2 (50.4)	3.1 (37.6)	−1.7 (28.9)	−4.9 (23.2)	−6.0 (21.2)
Average precipitation mm (inches)	63.3 (2.49)	68.3 (2.69)	121.3 (4.78)	134.2 (5.28)	188.1 (7.41)	213.7 (8.41)	181.7 (7.15)	160.2 (6.31)	319.2 (12.57)	258.4 (10.17)	95.8 (3.77)	66.6 (2.62)	1,870.8 (73.65)
Average precipitation days (≥ 1.0 mm)	5.4	5.9	9.6	9.6	10.3	12.6	11.3	8.9	11.3	10.6	6.5	5.6	107.6
Mean monthly sunshine hours	173.1	163.3	182.2	190.5	191.1	137.3	174.8	208.2	150.1	157.9	159.4	174.7	2,059.8
Source: Japan Meteorological Agency

=== Demographics ===
The population of Ise has remained relatively steady over the past 50 years.

Historical population
Year	Pop.	±%
1960	123,311	—
1970	130,339	+5.7%
1980	137,296	+5.3%
1990	138,298	+0.7%
2000	136,173	−1.5%
2010	130,228	−4.4%

== History ==
Ise's history is directly linked to that of Ise Grand Shrine. Ise Grand Shrine is separated into two main parts: The Inner Shrine and the Outer Shrine. Despite the names, these are actually two physically separate shrines approximately six kilometers apart. Ise began with small settlements that had sprung up around the two shrines. During the Edo period, Ise was a major destination for pilgrimages which were called "o-Ise-mairi" (literally, "Coming to Ise") and thus, these settlements grew larger and developed into small villages. The village around the Inner Shrine was named Uji, and the village around the Outer Shrine was named Yamada. Because of the religious importance of Ise Grand Shrine, the Tokugawa shogunate during the Edo period viewed the area as politically significant and installed a magistrate in Yamada.

During the Meiji period, these two villages were merged with the establishment of the modern municipal system to form the town of Ujiyamada. The town was upgraded to city status on September 1, 1906. In 1909, the forerunner to the JNR connected Ujiyamada by train, followed by the forerunner of Kintetsu Railway in 1930. These lines were responsible for a large increase in pilgrims and tourists visiting Ise Grand Shrine, peaking with an estimated eight million visitors in the year 1940, per government-sponsored ceremonies celebrating the 2600th anniversary of the foundation of the Japanese empire. The significance of the Ise Grand Shrine to State Shinto made Ujiyamada a target for six air raids during World War II, the largest of which was on July 28, 1945 when 93 Twentieth Air Force Boeing B-29 Superfortress bombers dropped incendiaries, burning 39% of the city.

On January 1, 1955 Ujiyamada absorbed the villages of Toyohama, Kitahama, Shigō and Kida and was renamed Ise City. The reason for this change is to avoid naming confusion with the later-formed cities of Uji in Kyōto Prefecture and the city of Yamada (now the city of Kama) in Fukuoka Prefecture. The name "Ise" was chosen because it was already recognized throughout Japan due to Ise Grand Shrine. However, the renaming phase took some time around the city. For example, it took four years to rename the main JR station in town, Yamada Station, to Iseshi Station. Some things were never renamed, such as Ujiyamada Station, Ise's largest train station, and Ujiyamada High School, Ise's first high school.

On September 26, 1959: The Ise-wan Typhoon, Japan's strongest-recorded typhoon, hit Ise and surrounding areas.

On November 1, 2005: Ise absorbed the towns of Futami and Obata and the village of Misono (all from Watarai District).

== Government ==
Ise has a mayor-council form of government with a directly elected mayor and a unicameral city council of 28 members. Ise contributes four members to the Mie Prefectural Assembly. In terms of national politics, the city is part of Mie 4th district of the lower house of the Diet of Japan.

== Economy ==
=== Products ===
- Akafuku: Mochi covered in sweet red bean paste.
- Ise Udon: Udon dressed in soy-based sauce.
- IseWashi: Washi (Japanese paper) for Ise Grand Shrine.

=== Industry ===
==== Factories ====
- Kyocera
- NGK
- Yokohama Rubber Company

== Education ==
Ise has 23 public elementary schools and ten public middle schools operated by the city government and six public high schools operated by the Mie Prefectural Department of Education. The city also has one private middle school and four private high schools. The Shinto-affiliated Kogakkan University is located in Ise.

== Transportation ==
=== Railway ===
Ise is easily accessible by rail due to the popularity of Ise Grand Shrine as a tourist attraction. Kintetsu offers direct service to Ise from Kyoto, Osaka and Nagoya in the form of regular express trains (once or twice an hour) and limited express trains (usually twice an hour). The ride from Osaka takes about 135 minutes (105 minutes on the limited express), the ride from Nagoya takes about 100 minutes (85 minutes on the limited express). JR Central, offers direct service to Ise from Nagoya once an hour on the Mie Rapid, which takes about 90 minutes.

==== Lines and stations ====
Kintetsu Railway - Yamada Line

- ( << for Nagoya, Osaka ) • Akeno • Obata • Miyamachi • Iseshi • Ujiyamada

Kintetsu Railway - Toba Line

- (Ujiyamada • Isuzugawa • Asama • ( for Kashikojima >> )

JR Tōkai - Sangū Line

- ( << for Nagoya, Kameyama ) • Miyagawa • Yamada-Kamiguchi • Iseshi • Isuzugaoka • Futaminoura • Matsushita • Ikenoura Seaside • ( for Toba >> )

=== Bus ===
Sanco operates a number of buses to and through Ise. The main bus hub in town is in front of the JR exit of Iseshi Station. Sanco used to manage a tram service around Ise, in particular a line called the "Shinto Line" that ran from Iseshi Station to the Inner Shrine. It was closed in 1961 and was replaced by buses.

=== Roads ===
==== Expressways ====
- Ise Expressway Ise-nishi IC • Ise IC

==== Toll roads ====
- Ise Futami Toba Line
- Iseshima Skyline

==== National Routes ====
- National Route 23
- National Route 42
- National Route 167

=== Air ===
Ise has a direct ferry link to Central Japan International Airport.

== Local attractions ==
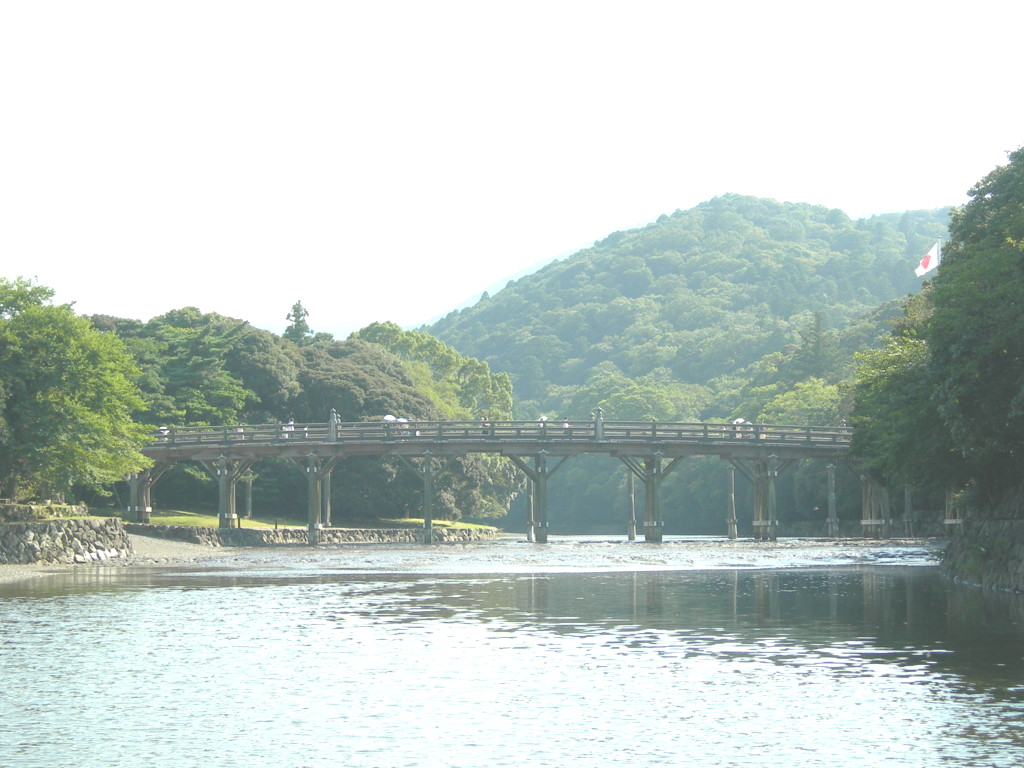
Uji Bridge, entrance to the Inner Shrine

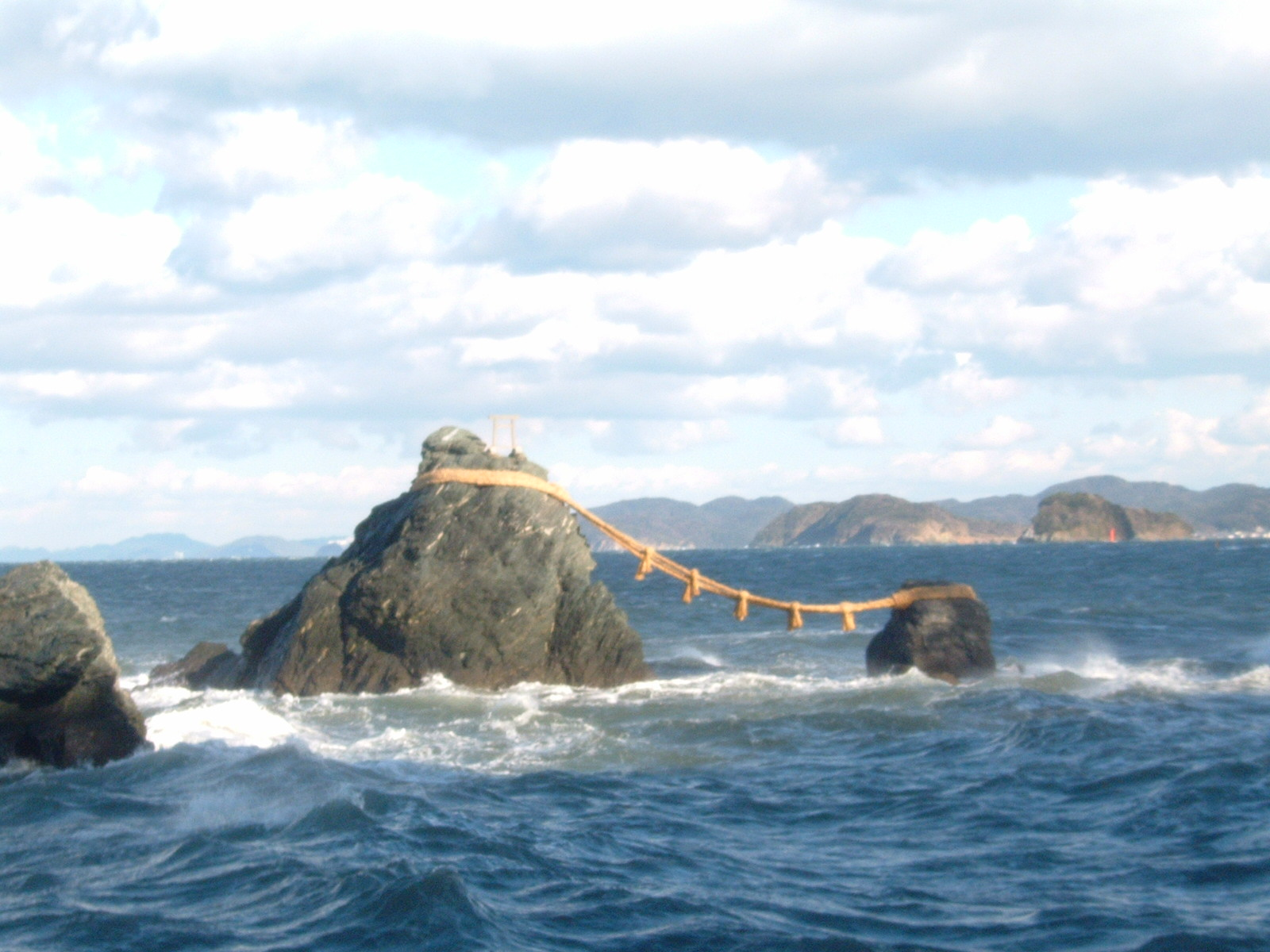
Meoto Iwa, the "wedded rocks" at high tide

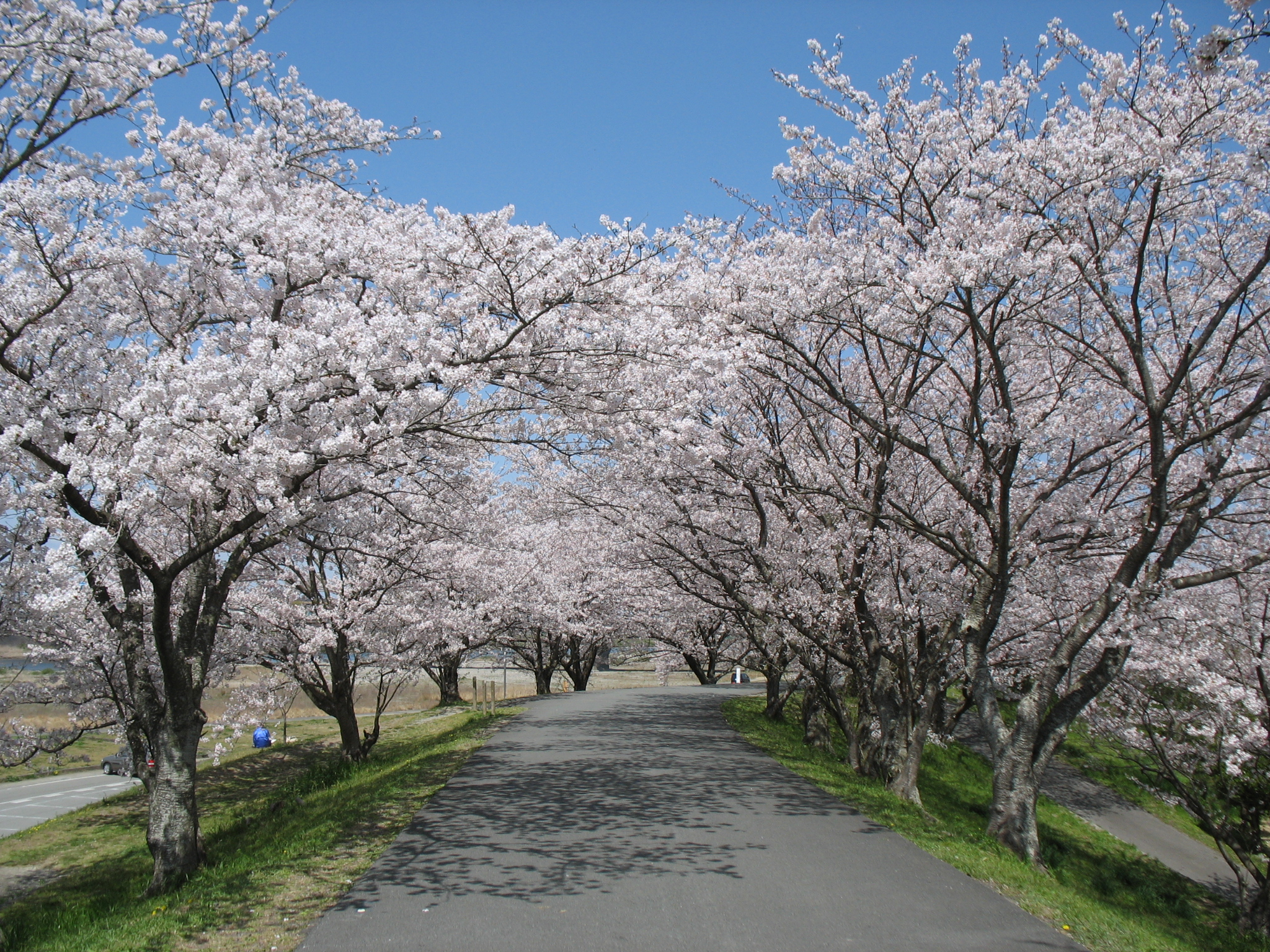
Miya River cherry blossoms

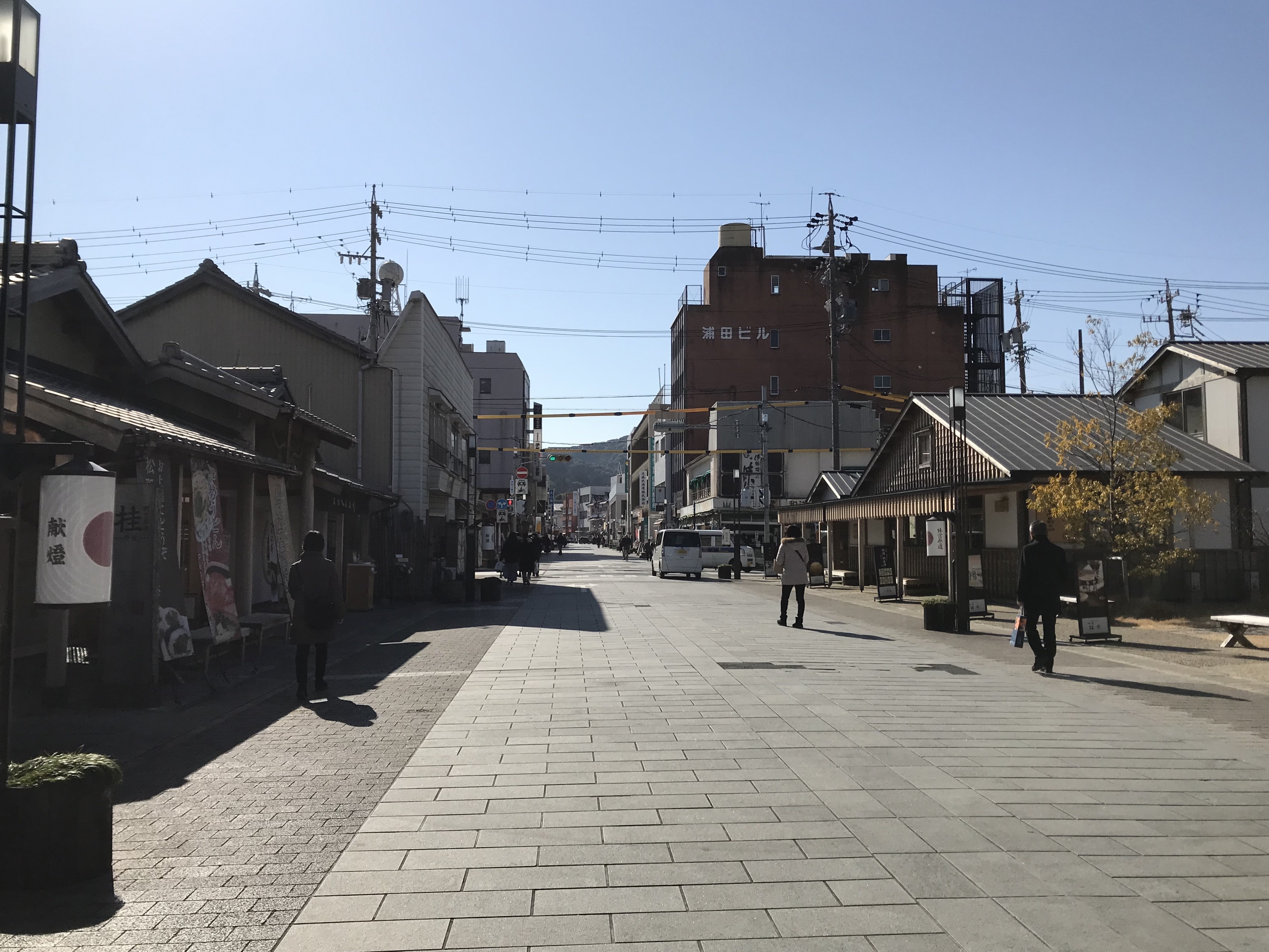
Geku-Sando Street

- Ise Grand Shrine: It is sometimes called "The Shrine of the shrines" to indicate its status as the most sacred Shintō shrine. Legend has it that Yata no Kagami (The Sacred Mirror), one of the Three Sacred Treasures of Japan, is housed somewhere within the grounds. The entire Shrine is completely rebuilt from scratch every 20 years using fresh lumber that is brought to Ise and then ceremonially carried through the streets on its way to the Shrine during an okihiki (お木曳). The Shrine is in its 62nd reconstruction, meaning this tradition has been carried out for at least 1,240 years. The next reconstruction will be in 2033.
  - Outer Shrine (外宮 gekū): Sometimes called toyouke-daijingū (豊受大神宮), it is dedicated to Toyouke-Ōmikami, the goddess of food, clothing, and shelter (life's basic needs). Pilgrims are supposed to visit the Outer Shrine before visiting the Inner Shrine. The Outer Shrine is very close to Ise-shi Station.
  - Inner Shrine (内宮 naikū): Sometimes called kō-taijingū (皇大神宮), it is dedicated to Amaterasu-Ōmikami, the sun goddess who is sometimes called the "supreme kami." This shrine sees many visitors from around Japan on a daily basis; there is a sharp increase during the New Year's season. People traditionally visit a shrine on New Year's Day, but since it will be the first visit of a new year, special consideration is given to the choice of shrine. Some people travel to shrines that may be more significant than those in their own area, and this inevitably leads people to Ise Grand Shrine, particularly the Inner Shrine. The inner sanctum of the main shrine area within the Inner Shrine is off-limits to visitors, thus only the rooftop of the structure that houses the kami can be seen.
  - Cultural facilities: These institutions provide a deeper understanding of Ise Grand Shrine. They are all housed at the top Mt. Kurata which is part of the pilgrimage route between the Outer Shrine and the Inner Shrine.
    - History Museum or Jingu Chokokan Museum (神宮徴古館 jingū-chōkokan) chronicles the creation and development of the Shrine.
    - Fine Art Museum (神宮美術館 jingū-bijutsukan) displays works by artists and painters donated during the reconstruction ceremony that is held once every 20 years.
    - Agricultural Museum (神宮農業館 jingū-nōgyōkan): Since the Outer Shrine is dedicated to Toyouke-Ōmikami, the goddess of life's basic needs, this museum covers how agriculture fulfills these needs.
    - Library (神宮文庫 jingū-bunko) contains various volumes dealing with Shintō and Ise Grand Shrine. Open to the public but generally only used by researchers and Shintō priests.
  - Oharai Machi (おはらい町): A small side street that runs between Prefectural Route 32 and the entrance to the Inner Shrine with buildings that are made to evoke the Edo period. The part of the road near the Inner Shrine offers all sort of omiyage souvenirs.
  - Okage Yoko-chō (おかげ横丁): This area branches off of Oharai Machi about halfway between Prefectural Route 32 and the entrance to the Inner Shrine. It has a large concentration of eateries. Taiko performances can be heard here sometimes, usually on the weekends.
- The Wedded Rocks (夫婦岩, meoto-iwa): Located at Futami Okitama Shrine (二見興玉神社) in northeastern Ise. The rocks have been enshrined and are thus considered gods.
- Ise-Shima National Park
  - Ise-Shima Skyline: A 16.3-km-long scenic mountain road between Ise and Toba.
  - Mt. Asama (朝熊山): At 555m, this is the highest mountain in Ise; its two TV towers make it very distinctive. A lookout point is accessible from the Ise-Shima Skyline road. Nearby is a spa. The summit can also be reached on foot, beginning just north of Asama Station.
  - Kongōshō Temple (金剛證寺): A Buddhist temple near the top of Mt. Asama. It is accessible from the Ise-Shima Skyline road.
- Miya River
  - Riverside Park (宮川堤公園 miya-gawa tsutsumi kōen): A cherry blossom viewing area, making it a popular destination during the prime blooming season early in April. Fireworks are hosted in mid-July. The park is on the east side of the river near the Watarai Bridge.
  - Love River (ラブリバー) houses public leisure and sports facilities for baseball, soccer, basketball, and tennis. The park is on the east side of the river near Route 23.
- Kawasaki: A section of historical buildings of the old merchant quarters in Ise that is located along the Seta River north of the Ujiyamada Station.

== Festivals ==
- Ise Festival: Ise's largest festival, held for two days in mid-October to celebrate all things Ise.
- Okihiki (お木曳): Festival in which the timber that will be used to reconstruct Ise Grand Shrine is ceremonially carried through the streets. Each neighborhood (or district) of Ise city is responsible for carrying its share of the load, and the ceremony is spread out over many weekends to allow all neighborhoods to participate. This festival is only held for the three consecutive years starting eight years before a Shrine reconstruction. For example, the Okihiki festivals for the next Shrine reconstruction in 2013 were held in 2005, 2006, and 2007. Okihiki for the Outer Shrine is held in May and starts on the Miya River. Okihiki for the Inner Shrine is held in late July and starts near the Isuzu River.
- Cherry Blossom Festival is held early April on the Miya River (near the Watarai Bridge).
- Miya River Fireworks is held in mid-July.
- Tennō Festival is held usually on the Sunday evening of the three-day weekend in July near Kawasaki and is well known for goldfish fireworks at night.

== Notable people ==
- Takao Fujinami (1932–2007), politician, cabinet minister
- Hiroshi Fujiwara (b. 1964), musician
- Naoki Hatta (b. 1986), professional soccer player
- Kon Ichikawa (1915–2008), film director.
- Tomoya Kanamori (b. 1982). Professional soccer player
- Katué Kitasono (1902–1978), poet, photographer
- Shinichiro Koyama (b. 1978), professional baseball player
- Atsushi Miyake (b. 1999), racing driver
- Hiroki Mizumoto (b. 1985), soccer player. Has played for the Japan National Soccer team. Born in Ise (Misono).
- Shun Morishita (b. 1986), professional soccer player
- Daisuke Nakai (b. 1989), professional baseball player
- Yōko Natsuki (b. 1952), actress
- Kenta Nishimoto (b. 1994), professional badminton player
- Mizuki Noguchi (1978– ), runner. Marathon gold medalist in the Athens 2004 Summer Olympics. Grew up in Ise.
- Eiji Sawamura (1917–1944), baseball player (pitcher). Member of the Japanese Baseball Hall-of-Fame. Born in Ise.
- Ōoka Tadasuke (1672–1752), samurai. Served as Chief of Police under the shōgun Tokugawa Yoshimune. Served as Magistrate of Yamada (modern-day Ise) in the Edo period.
- Isao Takahata (1935—2018), director. Co-head of Studio Ghibli. Born in Ise.
- June Yamagishi (b. 1953), musician
