= Miya River (Mie) =

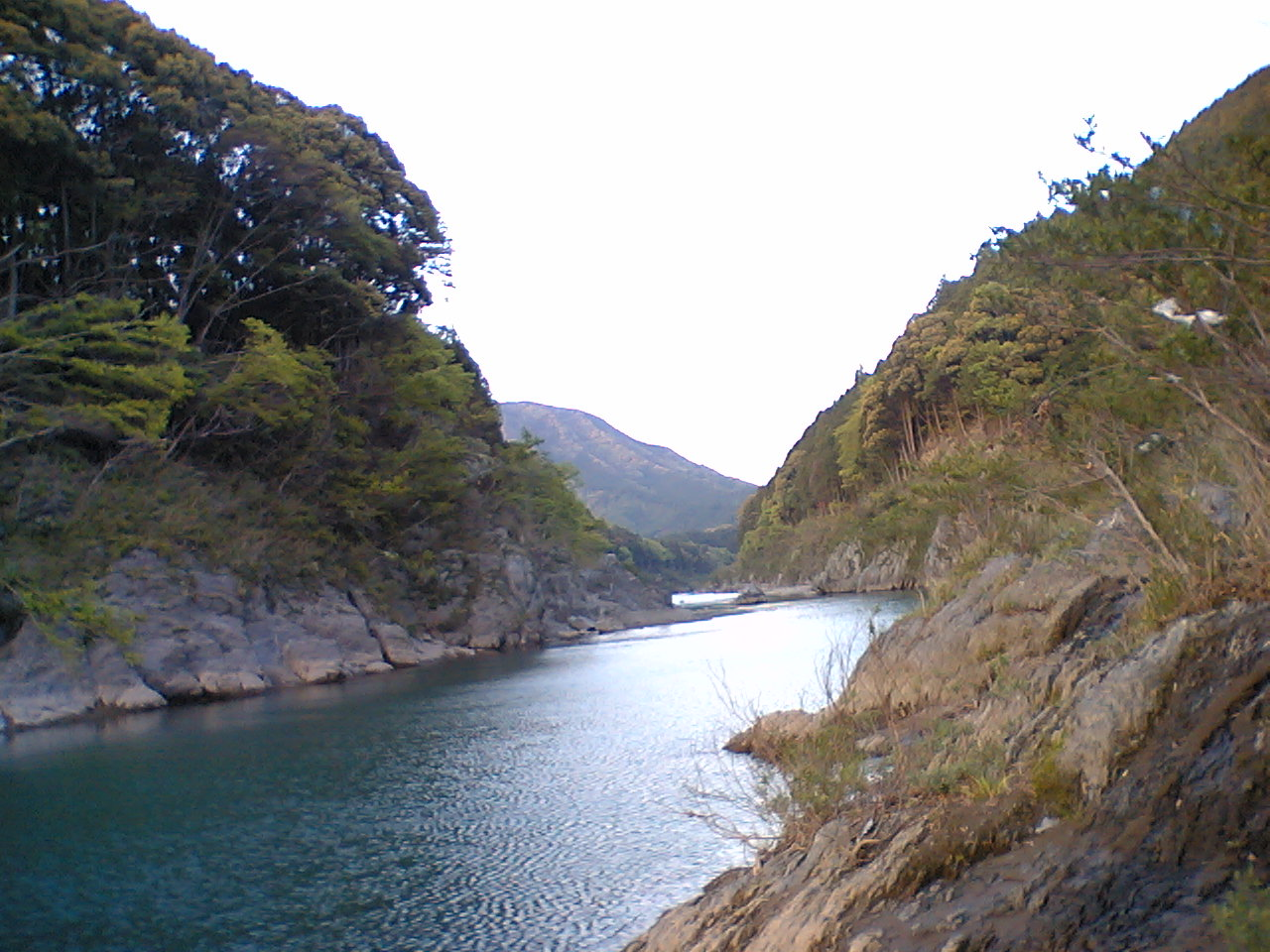

- Location within Japan
- Native name: 宮川 (Japanese)

Location
- Country: Japan

Physical characteristics
- Source
  - location: Mount Ōdaigahara
  - elevation: 1,695 m (5,561 ft)
- Mouth
  - location: Ise Bay
  - coordinates: 34°32′18″N 136°43′49″E
  - elevation: 0 m (0 ft)
- Length: 91 km (57 mi)
- Basin size: 920 km^{2} (360 mi^{2})
- Discharge
  - average: 36.3 m^{3}/s (1,280 cu ft/s)

The Miya River (宮川, Miya-gawa) is a major river that flows through central Mie Prefecture on the island of Honshū, Japan. It is officially classified as a Class 1 river by the Japanese government and is one of four Class 1 rivers that flow solely through Mie; it is the longest among these four.

Known for being especially pristine, the Miya River was rated cleanest Class 1 river in the country five times between 2000 and 2010 in the government's annual water quality study.

The river's source is on Mount Ōdaigahara in the town of Ōdai, Mie Prefecture, where it flows through the Ōsugi Valley. It then flows northeast-wards down the mountains and passes through a number of dams before reaching the tea fields of central Mie and finally passes through the city of Ise before reaching its delta and flowing into Ise Bay.

The white rocks used in the Oshiraishi-mochi festival, an event held in honor of the periodic rebuilding of nearby Ise Grand Shrine, are taken from the Miya River's shores.

== Flooding ==
Some of the areas along the river's course, especially the Ōsugi Valley near the source, see a considerable amount of rain each year and thus are very prone to flooding. Even with modern flood prevention, minor damage from flooding is still seen along parts of the river each year.

Flooding from the river was so severe in the past that it was one of the first rivers in Japan to receive a floodbank during the Edo era. The magistrate in Yamada (modern Ise) during the Tokugawa Shogunate felt that the river needed to be controlled because of its proximity to Ise Grand Shrine, Japan's holiest shrine; he thus ordered work to be done along the river to alleviate the problem. These alterations, which were primarily done along the Yamada-side of the river, were effective in reducing flood damage on that side however increased flooding problems on the other side. Due to the changes made, a bridge across the river was not completed until the Meiji era.

The only significant flooding in recent history was the result of typhoon #21 in 2004, in which six people died. These deaths occurred in the former village of Miyagawa, and this disaster was a prime factor behind the village being absorbed by the town of Ōdai soon after.

== Wildlife ==
The Miya River is home to over 90 different species of wildlife. There are fishing operations for some of the more prevalent ones, including eel (unagi), conger eel (anago), and sweetfish (ayu).

== Recreation ==
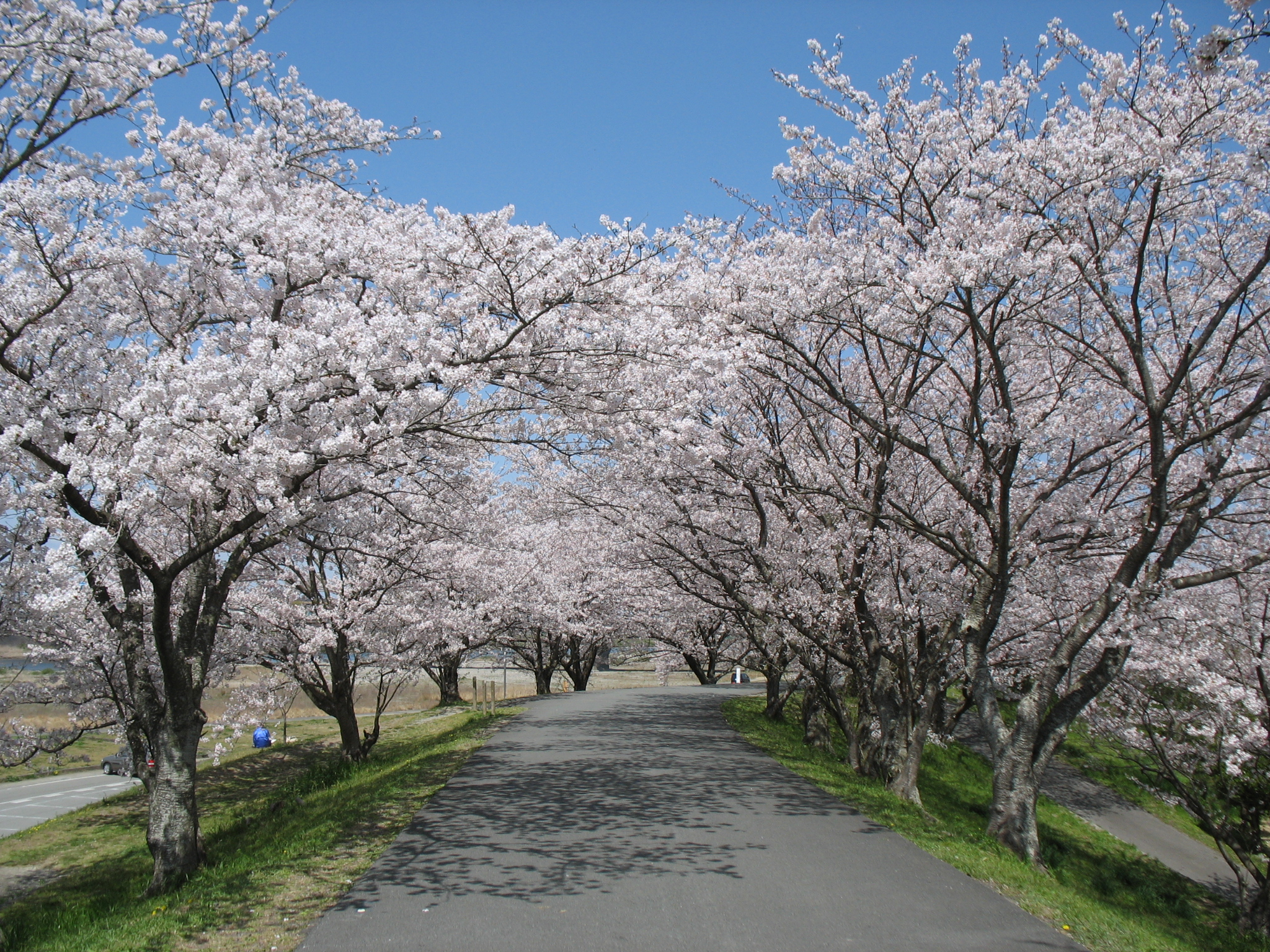
Cherry blossoms along the Miya River floodbank

Other than fishing, the Miya River and its banks provides some recreational opportunities.

Near the source, the river flows through the Ōsugi Valley, which is officially listed as one of the top three ravines in Japan for sight-seeing.

Further down the river, there are some parks along the riverbanks. There are cherry blossom parks in both Watarai and Ise, with the one in Ise having the most sakura trees in all of Mie. Many people have cherry blossom viewing parties here during the blooming season in early April.

A large fireworks show is held each July at the park in Ise as well. Close to the mouth there is a park for sports, jogging, picnicking, and other recreation.
