= Ujiyamada Station =

Railway station in Ise, Mie Prefecture, Japan

Ujiyamada Station 宇治山田駅
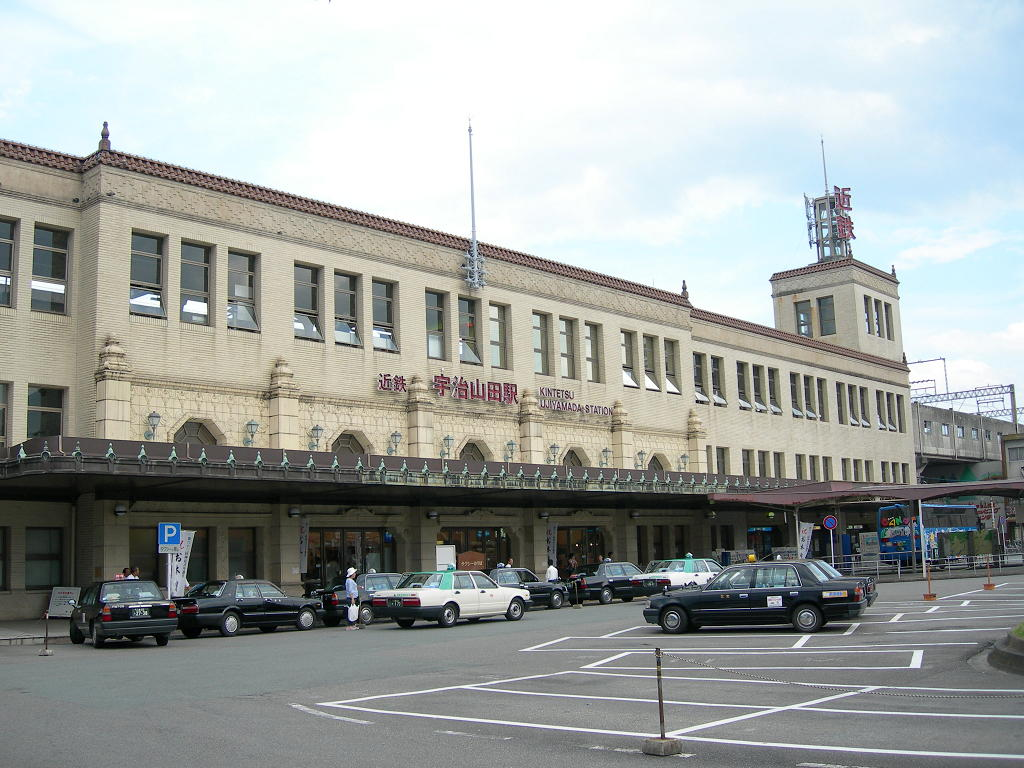
- Ujiyamada Station frontage, July 2006

General information
- Location: 2-1-43 Iwabuchi, Ise City, Mie Prefecture 516-0037; Japan
- Coordinates: 34.488205°N 136.713733°E
- Operator: Kintetsu Railway
- Lines: Yamada Line; Toba Line
- Distance: 28.3 km (17.6 mi) from Ise-Nakagawa
- Platforms: 1 side platform and 3 bay platforms
- Tracks: 5
- Connections: Bus terminal

Construction
- Structure type: Elevated

Other information
- Status: Staffed
- Station code: M74

History
- Opened: 17 March 1931; 95 years ago

Passengers
- FY2019: 5,484 daily

Services
Preceding station	Kintetsu Railway	Following station
through to Yamada Line	Toba Line Local Express Rapid Express Limited Express	Isuzugawa towards Toba
through to Yamada Line	Toba Line Non-stop Limited Express Premium Express Shimakaze	Toba Terminus
Iseshi towards Ise-Nakagawa	Yamada Line Local Express Rapid Express Limited Express Non-stop Limited Express Premium Express Shimakaze	through to Toba Line
Location
- Location within Mie Prefecture Location within Kansai region Location within Japan

Ujiyamada Station (宇治山田駅, Ujiyamada-eki) is a junction railway station located in the city of Ise, Mie Prefecture, Japan, operated by the private operator Kintetsu. It is the closest station to Ise Grand Shrine and thus has an important role for tourists and pilgrims. The station also administers the section between Kushida Station and Isuzugawa Station.

== Lines ==
Ujiyamada Station is served by the Kintetsu Yamada Line and the Toba Line. It is 28.3 rail kilometers from the terminus of both lines at Ise-Nakagawa Station.

== Station layout ==
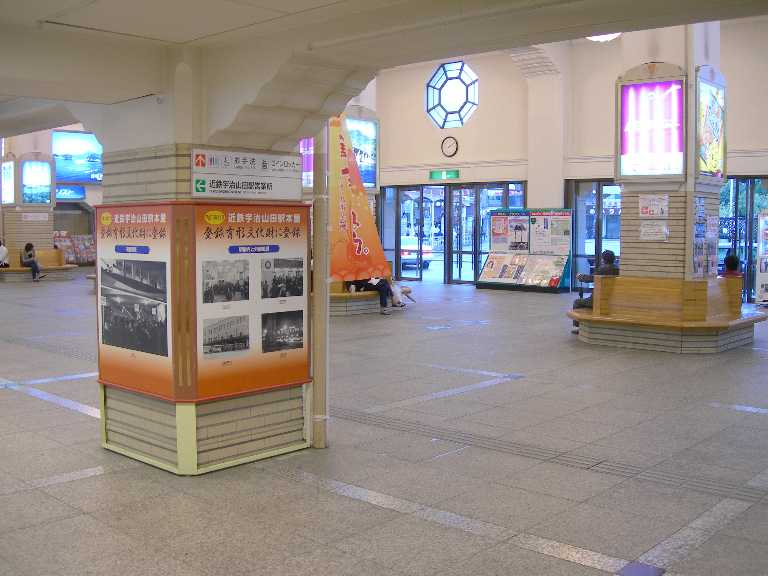
Entrance

platform map Right: to Toba and Kashikojima Left: to Iseshi Station

Ujiyamada Station has 2 through platforms and two bay platforms, a total of four. The platforms are on the third floor of the station building. The only entrance to the building is on the west of the first floor. A royal suite is located in the second floor. Originally a penthouse on the building's east end, it was used as a fire watch tower, and became the firefighting headquarters of postwar Ise.

=== Platforms ===
1	■ Yamada Line	returning for Ise-Nakagawa (partly)
2	■ Yamada Line	returning for Ise-Nakagawa, Nagoya and Osaka
3	■ Toba Line	for Toba and Kashikojima
4	■ Yamada Line	for Ise-Nakagawa, Nagoya, Osaka, Kobe and Kyoto

== History ==
Ujiyamada Station was opened as the terminal station of the Sangu Kyuko Electric Railway on March 17, 1931. On March 15, 1941, the line merged with Osaka Electric Railway to become a station on Kansai Kyuko Railway's Yamada Line. This line in turn was merged with the Nankai Electric Railway on June 1, 1944 to form Kintetsu. Services to Nagoya began on January 20, 1920, and the line was extended from Ujiyamada to Isuzugawa Station on December 15, 1969. In 2001, the station building was named a Registered Registered Tangible Cultural Properties by the national government.

== Passenger statistics ==
In fiscal 2019, the station was used by an average of 5484 passengers daily (boarding passengers only).

== Surrounding area ==
- Ise Grand Shrine
- Chokokan Ise Grand Shrine History Museum
- Ise City Hall
- Ise sight-seeing information center
- Kōgakkan University
- Kōgakkan High School
- Ise High School
- Ise Technical High School

== Gallery ==
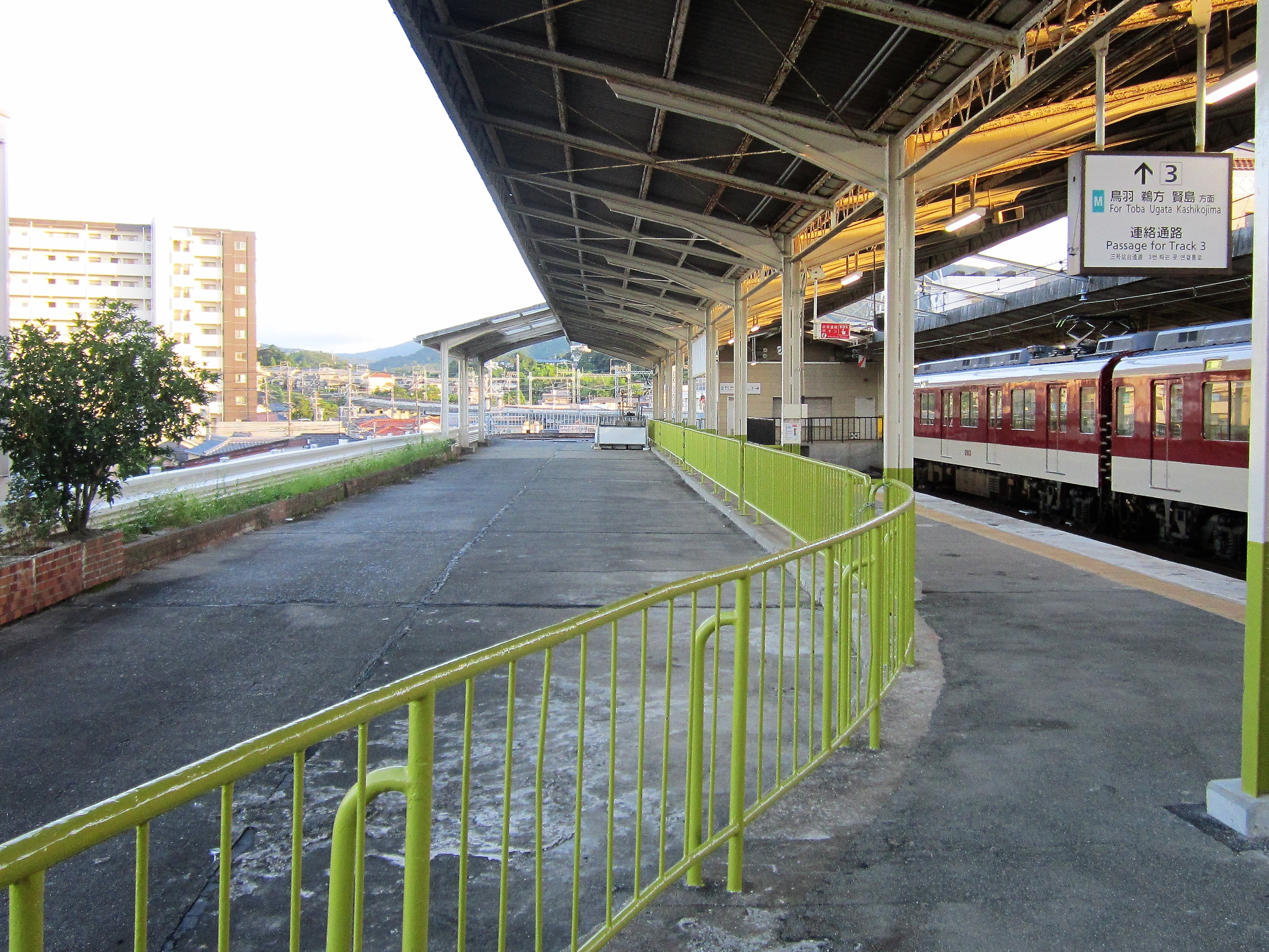
Platforms, August 2019

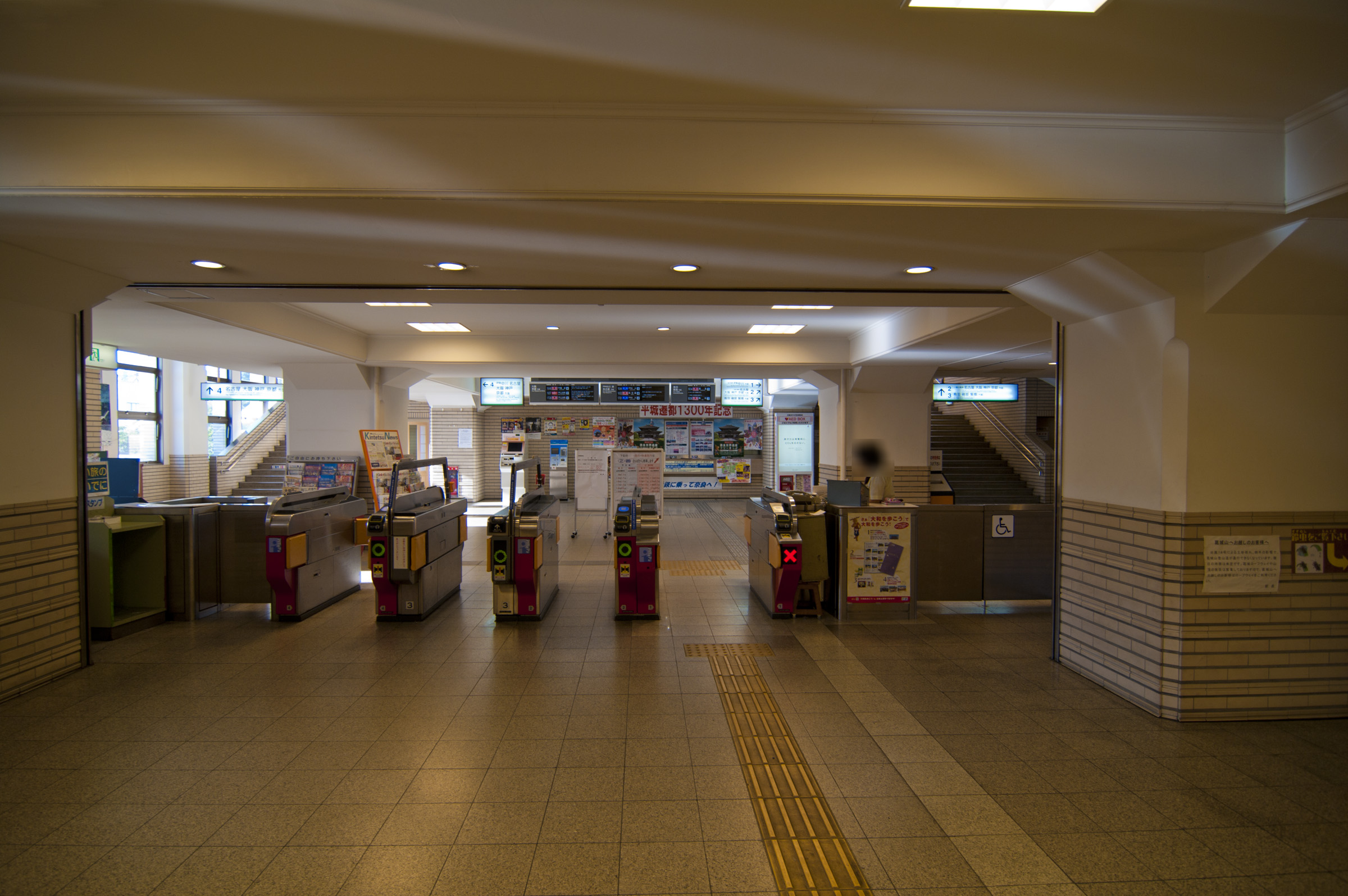
Fare gates, August 2010

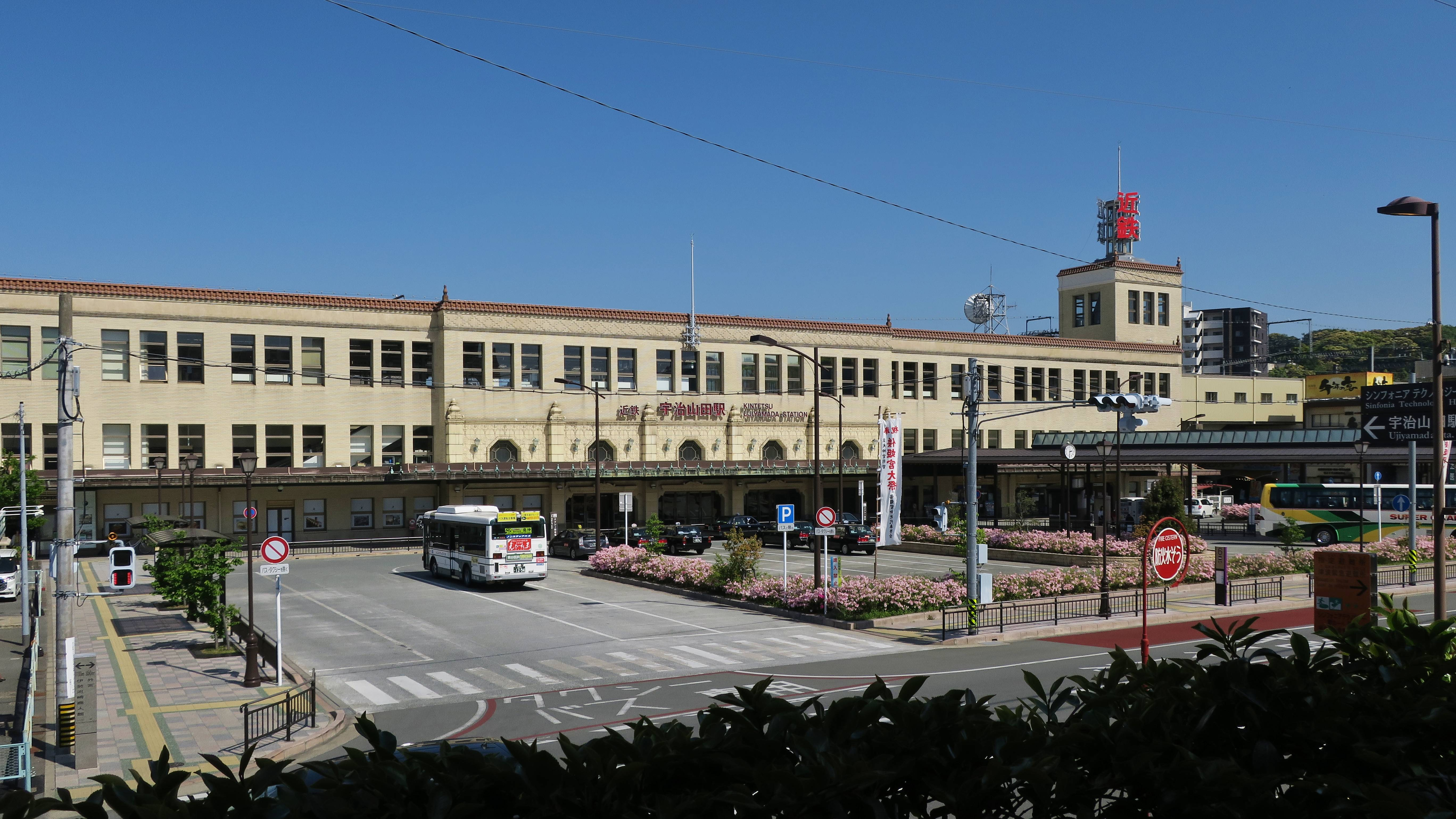
Station structure, April 2018

== See also ==
- List of railway stations in Japan
