= List of railway stations in Japan: I =

List of railway stations in Japan

| A | B | C | D | E | F | G | H | I | J | KL | M | N | O | P | R | S | T | U | W | Y | Z |

This list shows the railway stations in Japan that begin with the letter I. This is a subset of the full list of railway stations in Japan.

== Station list ==
=== Ib - Ik ===
| Ibara Station | 井原駅（いばら） |
| Ibaraichi Station | 井原市駅（いばらいち） |
| Ibaraki Station | 茨木駅（いばらき） |
| Ibaraki-shi Station | 茨木市駅（いばらきし） |
| Ibarame Station | 茨目駅（いばらめ） |
| Ibi Station | 揖斐駅（いび） |
| Ibii Station | 伊比井駅（いびい） |
| Iburihashi Station | 動橋駅（いぶりはし） |
| Ibusuki Station | 指宿駅（いぶすき） |
| Ichiba Station (Fukuoka) | 市場駅 (福岡県)（いちば） |
| Ichiba Station (JR West) | 市場駅 (JR西日本)（いちば） |
| Ichiba Station (Shintetsu) | 市場駅 (神戸電鉄)（いちば） |
| Ichibataguchi Station | 一畑口駅（いちばたぐち） |
| Ichibe Station | 市部駅（いちべ） |
| Ichibu Station (Kumamoto) | 一武駅（いちぶ） |
| Ichibu Station (Nara) | 一分駅（いちぶ） |
| Ichiburi Station | 市振駅（いちぶり） |
| Ichida Station | 市田駅（いちだ） |
| Ichigao Station | 市が尾駅（いちがお） |
| Ichigaya Station | 市ケ谷駅（いちがや） |
| Ichihana Station | 市塙駅（いちはな） |
| Ichihara Station | 市原駅（いちはら） |
| Ichihashi Station | 市橋駅 (岐阜県)（いちはし） |
| Ichijima Station | 市島駅（いちじま） |
| Ichijōdani Station | 一乗谷駅（いちじょうだに） |
| Ichijōji Station | 一乗寺駅（いちじょうじ） |
| Ichikawa Station | 市川駅（いちかわ） |
| Ichikawa-Daimon Station | 市川大門駅（いちかわだいもん） |
| Ichikawa-hommachi Station | 市川本町駅（いちかわほんまち） |
| Ichikawa-Mama Station | 市川真間駅（いちかわまま） |
| Ichikawa-Ono Station | 市川大野駅（いちかわおおの） |
| Ichikawa-Shiohama Station | 市川塩浜駅（いちかわしおはま） |
| Ichiki Station | 市来駅（いちき） |
| Ichinami Station | 市波駅（いちなみ） |
| Ichinobe Station | 市辺駅（いちのべ） |
| Ichinoe Station | 一之江駅（いちのえ） |
| Ichinohe Station | 一戸駅（いちのへ） |
| Ichinokawa Station | 市ノ川駅（いちのかわ） |
| Ichinomiya Station | 一宮駅（いちのみや） |
| Ichinomoto Station | 櫟本駅（いちのもと） |
| Ichinose Station | 市ノ瀬駅（いちのせ） |
| Ichinoseki Station | 一ノ関駅（いちのせき） |
| Ichinotorii Station | 一の鳥居駅（いちのとりい） |
| Ichinowari Station | 一ノ割駅（いちのわり） |
| Ichinowatari Station | 一の渡駅（いちのわたり） |
| Ichinuno Station | 市布駅（いちぬの） |
| Ichio Station | 市尾駅（いちお） |
| Ichioka Station | 市岡駅（いちおか） |
| Ichishi Station | 一志駅（いちし） |
| Ichishiro Station | 市城駅（いちしろ） |
| Ichitana Station | 市棚駅（いちたな） |
| Ichitsubo Station | 市坪駅（いちつぼ） |
| Idagawa Station | 井田川駅（いだがわ） |
| Idakiso Station | 伊太祁曽駅（いだきそ） |
| Idamichi Station | 猪田道駅（いだみち） |
| Ide Station | 井出駅（いで） |
| Idemitsu Bijutsukan Station | 出光美術館駅（いでみつびじゅつかん） |
| Ido Station | 井戸駅（いど） |
| Idogaya Station | 井土ヶ谷駅（いどがや） |
| Iehisa Station | 家久駅（いえひさ） |
| Iejigawa Station | 家地川駅（いえぢがわ） |
| Ieki Station | 家城駅（いえき） |
| Ienaka Station | 家中駅（いえなか） |
| Ieyama Station | 家山駅（いえやま） |
| Iga Station | 伊賀駅（いが） |
| Iga-Kambe Station | 伊賀神戸駅（いがかんべ） |
| Iga-Kōzu Station | 伊賀上津駅（いがこうづ） |
| Igami Station | 伊上駅（いがみ） |
| Igashima Station | 五十島駅（いがしま） |
| Iga-Ueno Station | 伊賀上野駅（いがうえの） |
| Igaya Station | 伊賀屋駅（いがや） |
| Igumi Station | 居組駅（いぐみ） |
| Ihara Station | 井原停留場（いはら） |
| Iharanosato Station | 井原里駅（いはらのさと） |
| Iho Station | 伊保駅（いほ） |
| Ii Station | 飯井駅（いい） |
| Iibama Station | 飯羽間駅（いいばま） |
| Iida Station (Ishikawa) | 飯田駅 (石川県)（いいだ） |
| Iida Station (Nagano) | 飯田駅（いいだ） |
| Iidabashi Station | 飯田橋駅（いいだばし） |
| Iidaoka Station | 飯田岡駅（いいだおか） |
| Iigura Station | 飯倉駅（いいぐら） |
| Iijima Station | 飯島駅（いいじま） |
| Iimori Station | 飯森駅（いいもり） |
| Iinoura Station | 飯浦駅（いいのうら） |
| Iinuma Station | 飯沼駅（いいぬま） |
| Iioka Station | 飯岡駅（いいおか） |
| Iiyama Station | 飯山駅（いいやま） |
| Iizaka Onsen Station | 飯坂温泉駅（いいざかおんせん） |
| Iizuka Station | 飯塚駅（いいづか） |
| Iizume Station | 飯詰駅（いいづめ） |
| Ijiri Station | 井尻駅（いじり） |
| Ijūin Station | 伊集院駅（いじゅういん） |
| Ikarigaseki Station | 碇ヶ関駅（いかりがせき） |
| Ikaushi Station | 伊香牛駅（いかうし） |
| Ikawa Station | 井川駅（いかわ） |
| Ikawadani Station | 伊川谷駅（いかわだに） |
| Ikawa-Sakura Station | 井川さくら駅（いかわさくら） |
| Ikawashi Station | 伊賀和志駅（いかわし） |
| Ikazaki Station | 五十崎駅（いかざき） |
| Ikeba Station | 池場駅（いけば） |
| Ikebe Station | 池部駅（いけべ） |
| Ikebukuro Station | 池袋駅（いけぶくろ） |
| Ikeda Station (Hokkaido) | 池田駅 (北海道)（いけだ） |
| Ikeda Station (Kumamoto) | 池田駅 (熊本県)（いけだ） |
| Ikeda Station (Osaka) | 池田駅 (大阪府)（いけだ） |
| Ikedaen Station | 池田園駅（いけだえん） |
| Ikegami Station | 池上駅（いけがみ） |
| Ikejiri Station | 池尻駅（いけじり） |
| Ikejiri-Ōhashi Station | 池尻大橋駅（いけじりおおはし） |
| Ikeno Station | 池野駅（いけの） |
| Ikenobe Station | 池戸駅（いけのべ） |
| Ikenotani Station | 池谷駅（いけのたに） |
| Ikenoue Station | 池ノ上駅（いけのうえ） |
| Ikenoura Seaside Station | 池の浦シーサイド駅（いけのうらしーさいど） |
| Ikenoura Station | 池の浦駅（いけのうら） |
| Ikeshita Station | 池下駅（いけした） |
| Ikezuki Station | 池月駅（いけづき） |
| Ikisan Station | 一貴山駅（いきさん） |
| Ikoinohiroba Station | いこいの広場駅（いこいのひろば） |
| Ikoinomura Station | いこいの村駅（いこいのむら） |
| Ikoma Station | 生駒駅（いこま） |
| Ikomasanjō Station | 生駒山上駅（いこまさんじょう） |
| Ikuji Station | 生地駅（いくじ） |
| Ikuno Station (Hokkaido) | 生野駅 (北海道)（いくの） |
| Ikuno Station (Hyogo) | 生野駅 (兵庫県)（いくの） |
| Ikunoya Station | 生野屋駅（いくのや） |
| Ikura Station | 井倉駅（いくら） |
| Ikusabata Station | 軍畑駅（いくさばた） |
| Ikuta Station | 生田駅 (神奈川県)（いくた） |
| Ikutahara Station | 生田原駅（いくたはら） |
| Ikutora Station | 幾寅駅（いくとら） |

=== Im - In ===
| Imabari Station | 今治駅（いまばり） |
| Imabashi Station | 今橋駅（いまばし） |
| Imabetsu Station | 今別駅（いまべつ） |
| Imabuku Station | 今福駅（いまぶく） |
| Imadegawa Station | 今出川駅（いまでがわ） |
| Imafuku-Tsurumi Station | 今福鶴見駅（いまふくつるみ） |
| Imagawa Station (Niigata) | 今川駅 (新潟県)（いまがわ） |
| Imagawa Station (Osaka) | 今川駅 (大阪府)（いまがわ） |
| Imagawakappa Station | 今川河童駅（いまがわかっぱ） |
| Imaguma Station | 今隈駅（いまぐま） |
| Imai Station | 今井駅（いまい） |
| Imaichi Station | 今市駅（いまいち） |
| Imaihamakaigan Station | 今井浜海岸駅（いまいはまかいがん） |
| Imaike Station (Aichi) | 今池駅 (愛知県)（いまいけ） |
| Imaike Station (Fukuoka) | 今池駅 (福岡県)（いまいけ） |
| Imaike Station (Osaka) | 今池停留場（いまいけ） |
| Imaise Station | 今伊勢駅（いまいせ） |
| Imaizumi Station | 今泉駅（いまいずみ） |
| Imajō Station | 今庄駅（いまじょう） |
| Imajuku Station | 今宿駅（いまじゅく） |
| Imamiya Station | 今宮駅（いまみや） |
| Imamiyaebisu Station | 今宮戎駅（いまみやえびす） |
| Imari Station | 伊万里駅（いまり） |
| Imayama Station | 今山駅（いまやま） |
| Imazato Station (Kintetsu) | 今里駅 (近鉄)（いまざと） |
| Imazato Station (Osaka Metro) | 今里駅 (Osaka Metro)（いまざと） |
| Imazu Station (Hyogo) | 今津駅 (兵庫県)（いまづ） |
| Imazu Station (Oita) | 今津駅 (大分県)（いまづ） |
| Imba Station | 印場駅（いんば） |
| Imba-Nihon-idai Station | 印旛日本医大駅（いんばにほんいだい） |
| Imbara Station | 因原駅（いんばら） |
| Imbe Station | 伊部駅（いんべ） |
| Ina Station | 伊奈駅（いな） |
| Inaba-Funaoka Station | 因幡船岡駅（いなばふなおか） |
| Inaba-Yashiro Station | 因幡社駅（いなばやしろ） |
| Ina-Chūō Station | 伊奈中央駅（いなちゅうおう） |
| Inada Station | 稲田駅（いなだ） |
| Inadazutsumi Station | 稲田堤駅（いなだづつみ） |
| Inadera Station | 猪名寺駅（いなでら） |
| Inae Station | 稲枝駅（いなえ） |
| Inaei Station | 稲永駅（いなえい） |
| Ina-Fukuoka Station | 伊那福岡駅（いなふくおか） |
| Inage Station | 稲毛駅（いなげ） |
| Inagekaigan Station | 稲毛海岸駅（いなげかいがん） |
| Inagi Station | 稲城駅（いなぎ） |
| Inagi-Naganuma Station | 稲城長沼駅（いなぎながぬま） |
| Inahara Station | 稲原駅（いなはら） |
| Inaho Station | 稲穂駅（いなほ） |
| Ina-Hongō Station | 伊那本郷駅（いなほんごう） |
| Inakadate Station | 田舎館駅（いなかだて） |
| Ina-Kamisato Station | 伊那上郷駅（いなかみさと） |
| Ina-Kita Station | 伊那北駅（いなきた） |
| Inako Station (Mie) | 依那古駅（いなこ） |
| Inako Station (Shizuoka) | 稲子駅（いなこ） |
| Ina-Kozawa Station | 伊那小沢駅（いなこざわ） |
| Ina-Matsushima Station | 伊那松島駅（いなまつしま） |
| Inami Station | 印南駅（いなみ） |
| Inamuragasaki Station | 稲村ケ崎駅（いなむらがさき） |
| Inano Station | 稲野駅（いなの） |
| Inao Station | 稲尾駅（いなお） |
| Ina-Ōshima Station | 伊那大島駅（いなおおしま） |
| Inari Station | 稲荷駅（いなり） |
| Inarichō Station | 稲荷町駅 (東京都)（いなりちょう） |
| Inariguchi Station | 稲荷口駅（いなりぐち） |
| Inarimachi Station (Toyama) | 稲荷町駅 (富山県)（いなりまち） |
| Inarimachi Station (Hiroshima) | 稲荷町停留場（いなりまち） |
| Inariyama Station | 稲荷山駅（いなりやま） |
| Inariyamakōen Station | 稲荷山公園駅（いなりやまこうえん） |
| Inashi Station | 伊那市駅（いなし） |
| Inashibetsu Station | 稲士別駅（いなしべつ） |
| Ina-Shimmachi Station | 伊那新町駅（いなしんまち） |
| Ina-Tajima Station | 伊那田島駅（いなたじま） |
| Inatoi Station | 稲戸井駅（いなとい） |
| Inawashiro Station | 猪苗代駅（いなわしろ） |
| Inawashirokohan Station | 猪苗代湖畔駅（いなわしろこはん） |
| Ina-Yawata Station | 伊那八幡駅（いなやわた） |
| Inazawa Station | 稲沢駅（いなざわ） |
| Inazumikōen Station | 稲積公園駅（いなづみこうえん） |
| Inazusa Station | 稲梓駅（いなずさ） |
| Innai Station | 院内駅（いんない） |
| Innoshō Station | 院庄駅（いんのしょう） |
| Ino Station (Chiba) | 井野駅 (千葉県)（いの） |
| Ino Station (Gunma) | 井野駅 (群馬県)（いの） |
| Ino Station (JR Shikoku) | 伊野駅（いの） |
| Ino Station (Tosa Electric Railway) | 伊野停留場（いの） |
| Inō Station (Hokkaido) | 伊納駅（いのう） |
| Inō Station (Yamaguchi) | 居能駅（いのう） |
| Inoekimae Station | 伊野駅前駅（いのえきまえ） |
| Inokashira-kōen Station | 井の頭公園駅（いのかしらこうえん） |
| Inokuchi Station (Hiroshima) | 井口駅 (広島県)（いのくち） |
| Inokuchi Station (Ishikawa) | 井口駅 (石川県)（いのくち） |
| Inonada Station | 伊野灘駅（いのなだ） |
| Inotani Station | 猪谷駅（いのたに） |
| Inotsuki Station | いのつき駅 |
| International Center Station | 国際センター駅 (宮城県)（こくさいせんたー） |
| Inubō Station | 犬吠駅（いぬぼう） |
| Inuzuka Station | 犬塚駅（いぬづか） |
| Inukai Station | 犬飼駅（いぬかい） |
| Inukawa Station | 犬川駅（いぬかわ） |
| Inuyama Station | 犬山駅（いぬやま） |
| Inuyamaguchi Station | 犬山口駅（いぬやまぐち） |
| Inuyama-yūen Station | 犬山遊園駅（いぬやまゆうえん） |
| Inzai-Makinohara Station | 印西牧の原駅（いんざいまきのはら） |

=== Io - Is ===
| Iogi Station | 井荻駅（いおぎ） |
| Iohji-mae Station | 医王寺前駅（いおうじまえ） |
| Ioki Station | 伊尾木駅（いおき） |
| Ippommatsu Station (Fukuoka) | 一本松駅 (福岡県)（いっぽんまつ） |
| Ippommatsu Station (Saitama) | 一本松駅 (埼玉県)（いっぽんまつ） |
| Iragawa Station | 五十川駅（いらがわ） |
| Ireji Station | 入地駅（いれじ） |
| Iri Station | 伊里駅（いり） |
| Iriake Station | 入明駅（いりあけ） |
| Irieoka Station | 入江岡駅（いりえおか） |
| Irigaikekōen Station | 杁ヶ池公園駅（いりがいけこうえん） |
| Irihirose Station | 入広瀬駅（いりひろせ） |
| Irinaka Station | いりなか駅（いりなか） |
| Irino Station | 入野駅 (鹿児島県)（いりの） |
| Iriso Station | 入曽駅（いりそ） |
| Iriuda Station | 入生田駅（いりうだ） |
| Iriya Station (Kanagawa) | 入谷駅 (神奈川県)（いりや） |
| Iriya Station (Tokyo) | 入谷駅 (東京都)（いりや） |
| Iriyamase Station | 入山瀬駅（いりやませ） |
| Irumashi Station | 入間市駅（いるまし） |
| Iryō Center Station | 医療センター駅（いりょうせんたー） |
| Isa Station | 石原駅 (京都府)（いさ） |
| Isahaya Station | 諫早駅（いさはや） |
| Isahaya-higashi-kōkō Station | 諫早東高校駅（いさはやひがしこうこう） |
| Isaida Station | 井細田駅（いさいだ） |
| Isaryō Station | 伊佐領駅（いさりょう） |
| Isawaonsen Station | 石和温泉駅（いさわおんせん） |
| Ise-Asahi Station | 伊勢朝日駅（いせあさひ） |
| Iseda Station | 伊勢田駅（いせだ） |
| Isegi Station | 井関駅（いせぎ） |
| Isehara Station | 伊勢原駅（いせはら） |
| Ise-Hata Station | 伊勢八太駅（いせはた） |
| Ise-Hatta Station | 伊勢治田駅（いせはった） |
| Ise-Ishibashi Station | 伊勢石橋駅（いせいしばし） |
| Ise-Kamakura Station | 伊勢鎌倉駅（いせかまくら） |
| Ise-Kashiwazaki Station | 伊勢柏崎駅（いせかしわざき） |
| Ise-Kawaguchi Station | 伊勢川口駅（いせかわぐち） |
| Ise-Kawashima Station | 伊勢川島駅（いせかわしま） |
| Ise-Matsumoto Station | 伊勢松本駅（いせまつもと） |
| Ise-Nakagawa Station | 伊勢中川駅（いせなかがわ） |
| Ise-Nakahara Station | 伊勢中原駅（いせなかはら） |
| Ise-Okitsu Station | 伊勢奥津駅（いせおきつ） |
| Ise-Ōi Station | 伊勢大井駅（いせおおい） |
| Isesaki Station | 伊勢崎駅（いせさき） |
| Iseshi Station | 伊勢市駅（いせし） |
| Ise-Takehara Station | 伊勢竹原駅（いせたけはら） |
| Ise-Ueno Station | 伊勢上野駅（いせうえの） |
| Ise-Wakamatsu Station | 伊勢若松駅（いせわかまつ） |
| Ise-Yachi Station | 伊勢八知駅（いせやち） |
| Isezakichōjamachi Station | 伊勢佐木長者町駅（いせざきちょうじゃまち） |
| Ishiba Station | 石場駅（いしば） |
| Ishibashi Station (Tochigi) | 石橋駅 (栃木県)（いしばし） |
| Ishibashi handai-mae Station | 石橋阪大前駅（いしばしはんだいまえ） |
| Ishibe Station | 石部駅（いしべ） |
| Ishibotoke Station | 石仏駅（いしぼとけ） |
| Ishida Station (Fukuoka) | 石田駅 (福岡県)（いしだ） |
| Ishida Station (Kyoto) | 石田駅 (京都府)（いしだ） |
| Ishidoriya Station | 石鳥谷駅（いしどりや） |
| Ishiga Station | 石蟹駅（いしが） |
| Ishikaki Station | 石垣駅（いしかき） |
| Ishigami Station | 石上駅（いしがみ） |
| Ishigamimae Station | 石神前駅（いしがみまえ） |
| Ishige Station | 石下駅（いしげ） |
| Ishihama Station | 石浜駅（いしはま） |
| Ishiharamachi Station | 石原町駅（いしはらまち） |
| Ishii Station (Hyogo) | 石井駅 (兵庫県)（いしい） |
| Ishii Station (Tokushima) | 石井駅 (徳島県)（いしい） |
| Ishiji Station | 石地駅（いしじ） |
| Ishikari-Kanazawa Station | 石狩金沢駅（いしかりかなざわ） |
| Ishikari-Numata Station | 石狩沼田駅（いしかりぬまた） |
| Ishikari-Tsukigata Station | 石狩月形駅（いしかりつきがた） |
| Ishikawa Pool Mae Station | 石川プール前駅（いしかわぷーるまえ） |
| Ishikawa Station (JR East) | 石川駅 (JR東日本)（いしかわ） |
| Ishikawa Station (Kōnan Railway) | 石川駅 (弘南鉄道)（いしかわ） |
| Ishikawachō Station | 石川町駅（いしかわちょう） |
| Ishikawadai Station | 石川台駅（いしかわだい） |
| Ishikiri Station | 石切駅（いしきり） |
| Ishikoshi Station | 石越駅（いしこし） |
| Ishikura Station | 石倉駅（いしくら） |
| Ishimine Station | 石嶺駅（いしみね） |
| Ishinden Station | 一身田駅（いしんでん） |
| Ishino Station | 石野駅（いしの） |
| Ishinomaki Station | 石巻駅（いしのまき） |
| Ishinomakiayumino Station | 石巻あゆみ野駅（いしのまきあゆみの） |
| Ishioka Station | 石岡駅（いしおか） |
| Ishiokaminamidai Station | 石岡南台駅（いしおかみなみだい） |
| Ishitegawa Park Station | 石手川公園駅（いしてがわこうえん） |
| Ishiuchi Station | 石打駅（いしうち） |
| Ishiuchi Dam Station | 石打ダム駅（いしうちだむ） |
| Ishiwara Station | 石原駅 (埼玉県)（いしわら） |
| Ishiya Station | 石谷駅（いしや） |
| Ishiyagawa Station | 石屋川駅（いしやがわ） |
| Ishiyama Station | 石山駅（いしやま） |
| Ishiyamadera Station | 石山寺駅（いしやまでら） |
| Ishizai Station | 石才駅（いしざい） |
| Ishizu Station (Gifu) | 石津駅（いしづ） |
| Ishizu Station (Osaka) | 石津停留場（いしづ） |
| Ishizuchiyama Station | 石鎚山駅（いしづちやま） |
| Ishizugawa Station | 石津川駅（いしづがわ） |
| Island Center Station | アイランドセンター駅（あいらんどせんたー） |
| Island Kitaguchi Station | アイランド北口駅（あいらんどきたぐち） |
| Isō Station | 石生駅（いそう） |
| Isobe Station (Gunma) | 磯部駅 (群馬県)（いそべ） |
| Isobe Station (Ishikawa) | 磯部駅 (石川県)（いそべ） |
| Isobunnai Station | 磯分内駅（いそぶんない） |
| Isogo Station | 磯子駅（いそご） |
| Isohara Station | 磯原駅（いそはら） |
| Isoichi Station | 五十市駅（いそいち） |
| Isonoura Station | 磯ノ浦駅（いそのうら） |
| Isotake Station | 五十猛駅（いそたけ） |
| Isoyama Station | 磯山駅（いそやま） |
| Isozaki Station | 磯崎駅（いそざき） |
| Issha Station | 一社駅（いっしゃ） |
| Isshōchi Station | 一勝地駅（いっしょうち） |
| Isurugi Station | 石動駅（いするぎ） |
| Isuzugaoka Station | 五十鈴ヶ丘駅（いすずがおか） |
| Isuzugawa Station | 五十鈴川駅（いすずがわ） |

=== It - Iz ===
| Itabashi Station | 板橋駅（いたばし） |
| Itabashi-honchō Station | 板橋本町駅（いたばしほんちょう） |
| Itabashi-kuyakusho-mae Station | 板橋区役所前駅（いたばしくやくしょまえ） |
| Itabu Station | 飯給駅（いたぶ） |
| Itakano Station | 井高野駅（いたかの） |
| Itako Station | 潮来駅（いたこ） |
| Itakura-tōyōdaimae Station | 板倉東洋大前駅（いたくらとうようだいまえ） |
| Itami Station (JR West) | 伊丹駅 (JR西日本)（いたみ） |
| Itami Station (Hankyu) | 伊丹駅 (阪急)（いたみ） |
| Itamochi Station | 板持駅（いたもち） |
| Itano Station | 板野駅（いたの） |
| Itaya Station | 板谷駅（いたや） |
| Itayado Station | 板宿駅（いたやど） |
| Itayanagi Station | 板柳駅（いたやなぎ） |
| Itō Station | 伊東駅（いとう） |
| Itoda Station | 糸田駅（いとだ） |
| Itoi Station | 糸井駅（いとい） |
| Itoigawa Station | 糸魚川駅（いといがわ） |
| Itoizawa Station | 糸魚沢駅（いといざわ） |
| Itonuki Station | 糸貫駅（いとぬき） |
| Itoshimakōkō-mae Station | 糸島高校前駅（いとしまこうこうまえ） |
| Itoshino Station | 愛し野駅（いとしの） |
| Itozaki Station | 糸崎駅（いとざき） |
| Itsukaichi Station | 五日市駅（いつかいち） |
| Itsukamachi Station | 五日町駅（いつかまち） |
| Itsutsubashi Station | 五橋駅（いつつばし） |
| Iwadate Station | 岩館駅（いわだて） |
| Iwade Station | 岩出駅（いわで） |
| Iwadeyama Station | 岩出山駅（いわでやま） |
| Iwafune Station | 岩舟駅（いわふね） |
| Iwafunemachi Station | 岩船町駅（いわふねまち） |
| Iwahana Station | 岩鼻駅（いわはな） |
| Iwahara Station | 岩原駅（いわはら） |
| Iwai Station | 岩井駅（いわい） |
| Iwaizumi Station | 岩泉駅（いわいずみ） |
| Iwaizumi-Omoto Station | 岩泉小本駅（いわいずみおもと） |
| Iwajuku Station | 岩宿駅（いわじゅく） |
| Iwaki Station (Fukushima) | いわき駅（いわき） |
| Iwaki Station (Nara) | 磐城駅（いわき） |
| Iwaki-Asakawa Station | 磐城浅川駅（いわきあさかわ） |
| Iwaki-Hanawa Station | 磐城塙駅（いわきはなわ） |
| Iwaki-Ishii Station | 磐城石井駅（いわきいしい） |
| Iwaki-Ishikawa Station | 磐城石川駅（いわきいしかわ） |
| Iwaki-Minato Station | 岩城みなと駅（いわきみなと） |
| Iwaki-Moriyama Station | 磐城守山駅（いわきもりやま） |
| Iwaki-Ōta Station | 磐城太田駅（いわきおおた） |
| Iwakiri Station | 岩切駅（いわきり） |
| Iwaki-Tanakura Station | 磐城棚倉駅（いわきたなくら） |
| Iwaki-Tokiwa Station | 磐城常葉駅（いわきときわ） |
| Iwakuni Station | 岩国駅（いわくに） |
| Iwakura Station (Aichi) | 岩倉駅 (愛知県)（いわくら） |
| Iwakura Station (Kyoto) | 岩倉駅 (京都府)（いわくら） |
| Iwakura Station (Yamaguchi) | 岩倉駅 (山口県)（いわくら） |
| Iwakuraji Station | 岩峅寺駅（いわくらじ） |
| Iwama Station | 岩間駅（いわま） |
| Iwamatsu Station | 岩松駅（いわまつ） |
| Iwami Station (Tottori) | 岩美駅（いわみ） |
| Iwami Station (Nara) | 石見駅（いわみ） |
| Iwami-Fukumitsu Station | 石見福光駅（いわみふくみつ） |
| Iwami-Kawagoe Station | 石見川越駅（いわみかわごえ） |
| Iwami-Kawamoto Station | 石見川本駅（いわみかわもと） |
| Iwami-Matsubara Station | 石見松原駅（いわみまつばら） |
| Iwami-Tsuda Station | 石見津田駅（いわみつだ） |
| Iwami-Tsuga Station | 石見都賀駅（いわみつが） |
| Iwami-Yanaze Station | 石見簗瀬駅（いわみやなぜ） |
| Iwami-Yokota Station | 石見横田駅（いわみよこた） |
| Iwamizawa Station | 岩見沢駅（いわみざわ） |
| Iwamoto Station | 岩本駅（いわもと） |
| Iwamotochō Station | 岩本町駅（いわもとちょう） |
| Iwamura Station | 岩村駅（いわむら） |
| Iwamurada Station | 岩村田駅（いわむらだ） |
| Iwamuro Station | 岩室駅（いわむろ） |
| Iwanami Station | 岩波駅（いわなみ） |
| Iwane Station | 巖根駅（いわね） |
| Iwanebashi Station | 岩根橋駅（いわねばし） |
| Iwanome Station | 岩野目駅（いわのめ） |
| Iwanoshita Station | 岩ノ下駅（いわのした） |
| Iwanuma Station | 岩沼駅（いわぬま） |
| Iwappara-Skiing Ground Station | 岩原スキー場前駅（いわっぱらスキーじょうまえ） |
| Iwasawa Station | 岩沢駅（いわさわ） |
| Iwase Station | 岩瀬駅（いわせ） |
| Iwasehama Station | 岩瀬浜駅（いわせはま） |
| Iwashima Station | 岩島駅（いわしま） |
| Iwashiro Station | 岩代駅（いわしろ） |
| Iwashimizu-hachimangū Station | 石清水八幡宮駅（いわしみずはちまんぐう） |
| Iwashiroshimizu Station | 岩代清水駅（いわしろしみず） |
| Iwata Station (Shizuoka) | 磐田駅（いわた） |
| Iwata Station (Yamaguchi) | 岩田駅（いわた） |
| Iwatakiguchi Station | 岩滝口駅（いわたきぐち） |
| Iwate-Funakoshi Station | 岩手船越駅（いわてふなこし） |
| Iwate-Futsukamachi Station | 岩手二日町駅（いわてふつかまち） |
| Iwate-Iioka Station | 岩手飯岡駅（いわていいおか） |
| Iwate-Kamigō Station | 岩手上郷駅（いわてかみごう） |
| Iwate-Kariya Station | 岩手刈屋駅（いわてかりや） |
| Iwate-Kawaguchi Station | 岩手川口駅（いわてかわぐち） |
| Iwate-Numakunai Station | いわて沼宮内駅（いわてぬまくない） |
| Iwate-Ōkawa Station | 岩手大川駅（いわておおかわ） |
| Iwate-Wainai Station | 岩手和井内駅（いわてわいない） |
| Iwato Station | 石刀駅（いわと） |
| Iwatsuka Station | 岩塚駅（いわつか） |
| Iwatsuki Station | 岩槻駅（いわつき） |
| Iwaya Station (Hyogo) | 岩屋駅 (兵庫県)（いわや） |
| Iwaya Station (Saga) | 岩屋駅 (佐賀県)（いわや） |
| Iwayama Station | 岩山駅（いわやま） |
| Iya Station | 揖屋駅（いや） |
| Iyaguchi Station | 祖谷口駅（いやぐち） |
| Iyo-Doi Station | 伊予土居駅（いよどい） |
| Iyo-Himi Station | 伊予氷見駅（いよひみ） |
| Iyo-Hirano Station | 伊予平野駅（いよひらの） |
| Iyo-Hōjō Station | 伊予北条駅（いよほうじょう） |
| Iyo-Iwaki Station | 伊予石城駅（いよいわき） |
| Iyo-Izushi Station | 伊予出石駅（いよいずし） |
| Iyo-Kameoka Station | 伊予亀岡駅（いよかめおか） |
| Iyo-Kaminada Station | 伊予上灘駅（いよかみなだ） |
| Iyoki Station | 伊与喜駅（いよき） |
| Iyo-Komatsu Station | 伊予小松駅（いよこまつ） |
| Iyo-Mishima Station | 伊予三島駅（いよみしま） |
| Iyo-Miyanoshita Station | 伊予宮野下駅（いよみやのした） |
| Iyo-Miyoshi Station | 伊予三芳駅（いよみよし） |
| Iyo-Nagahama Station | 伊予長浜駅（いよながはま） |
| Iyo-Nakayama Station | 伊予中山駅（いよなかやま） |
| Iyo-Ōhira Station | 伊予大平駅（いよおおひら） |
| Iyo-Ōzu Station | 伊予大洲駅（いよおおず） |
| Iyo-Saijō Station | 伊予西条駅（いよさいじょう） |
| Iyo-Sakurai Station | 伊予桜井駅（いよさくらい） |
| Iyo-Sangawa Station | 伊予寒川駅（いよさんがわ） |
| Iyoshi Station | 伊予市駅（いよし） |
| Iyo-Shirataki Station | 伊予白滝駅（いよしらたき） |
| Iyo-Tachibana Station | いよ立花駅（いよたちばな） |
| Iyo-Tachikawa Station | 伊予立川駅（いよたちかわ） |
| Iyo-Tomita Station | 伊予富田駅（いよとみた） |
| Iyo-Wake Station | 伊予和気駅（いよわけ） |
| Iyo-Yokota Station | 伊予横田駅（いよよこた） |
| Iyo-Yoshida Station | 伊予吉田駅（いよよしだ） |
| Izu-Atagawa Station | 伊豆熱川駅（いずあたがわ） |
| Izue Station | いずえ駅（いずえ） |
| Izu-Hokkawa Station | 伊豆北川駅（いずほっかわ） |
| Izu-Inatori Station | 伊豆稲取駅（いずいなとり） |
| Izukōgen Station | 伊豆高原駅（いずこうげん） |
| Izukyu Shimoda Station | 伊豆急下田駅（いずきゅうしもだ） |
| Izume Station | 出目駅（いずめ） |
| Izumi Station (Fukushima) | 泉駅 (福島市)（いずみ） |
| Izumi Station (Iwaki) | 泉駅 (福島県いわき市)（いずみ） |
| Izumi Station (Kagoshima) | 出水駅（いずみ） |
| Izumi-Chūō Station (Kanagawa) | いずみ中央駅（いずみちゅうおう） |
| Izumi-Chūō Station (Miyagi) | 泉中央駅（いずみちゅうおう） |
| Izumi-Chūō Station (Osaka) | 和泉中央駅（いずみちゅうおう） |
| Izumi-Fuchū Station | 和泉府中駅（いずみふちゅう） |
| Izumigaoka Station | 泉ヶ丘駅（いずみがおか） |
| Izumigō Station | 泉郷駅（いずみごう） |
| Izumi-Hashimoto Station | 和泉橋本駅（いずみはしもと） |
| Izumino Station | いずみ野駅（いずみの） |
| Izumi-Omiya Station | 和泉大宮駅（いずみおおみや） |
| Izumiotsu Station | 泉大津駅（いずみおおつ） |
| Izumisano Station | 泉佐野駅（いずみさの） |
| Izumisawa Station | 泉沢駅（いずみさわ） |
| Izumi-Sotoasahikawa Station | 泉外旭川駅（いずみそとあさひかわ） |
| Izumi-Sunagawa Station | 和泉砂川駅（いずみすながわ） |
| Izumita Station | 泉田駅（いずみた） |
| Izumi-Taiikukan Station | 泉体育館駅（いずみたいいくかん） |
| Izumi-Tamagawa Station | 和泉多摩川駅（いずみたまがわ） |
| Izumi-Tottori Station | 和泉鳥取駅（いずみとっとり） |
| Izumizaki Station | 泉崎駅（いずみざき） |
| Izumma Station | 出馬駅（いずんま） |
| Izumo-Daitō Station | 出雲大東駅（いずもだいとう） |
| Izumo-Jinzai Station | 出雲神西駅（いずもじんざい） |
| Izumo-Minari Station | 出雲三成駅（いずもみなり） |
| Izumo-Sakane Station | 出雲坂根駅（いずもさかね） |
| Izumo Science Center Park Town Mae Station | 出雲科学館パークタウン前駅（いずもかがくかんパークタウンまえ） |
| Izumoshi Station | 出雲市駅（いずもし） |
| Izumo Taisha-mae Station | 出雲大社前駅（いずもたいしゃまえ） |
| Izumo-Yashiro Station | 出雲八代駅（いずもやしろ） |
| Izumo-Yokota Station | 出雲横田駅（いずもよこた） |
| Izumozaki Station | 出雲崎駅（いずもざき） |
| Izu-Nagaoka Station | 伊豆長岡駅（いずながおか） |
| Izu-Nitta Station | 伊豆仁田駅（いずにった） |
| Izu-Ōkawa Station | 伊豆大川駅（いずおおかわ） |
| Izu-Taga Station | 伊豆多賀駅（いずたが） |
