= Ise-Kamakura Station =

Railway station in Tsu, Mie Prefecture, Japan

Ise-Kamakura Station 伊勢鎌倉駅
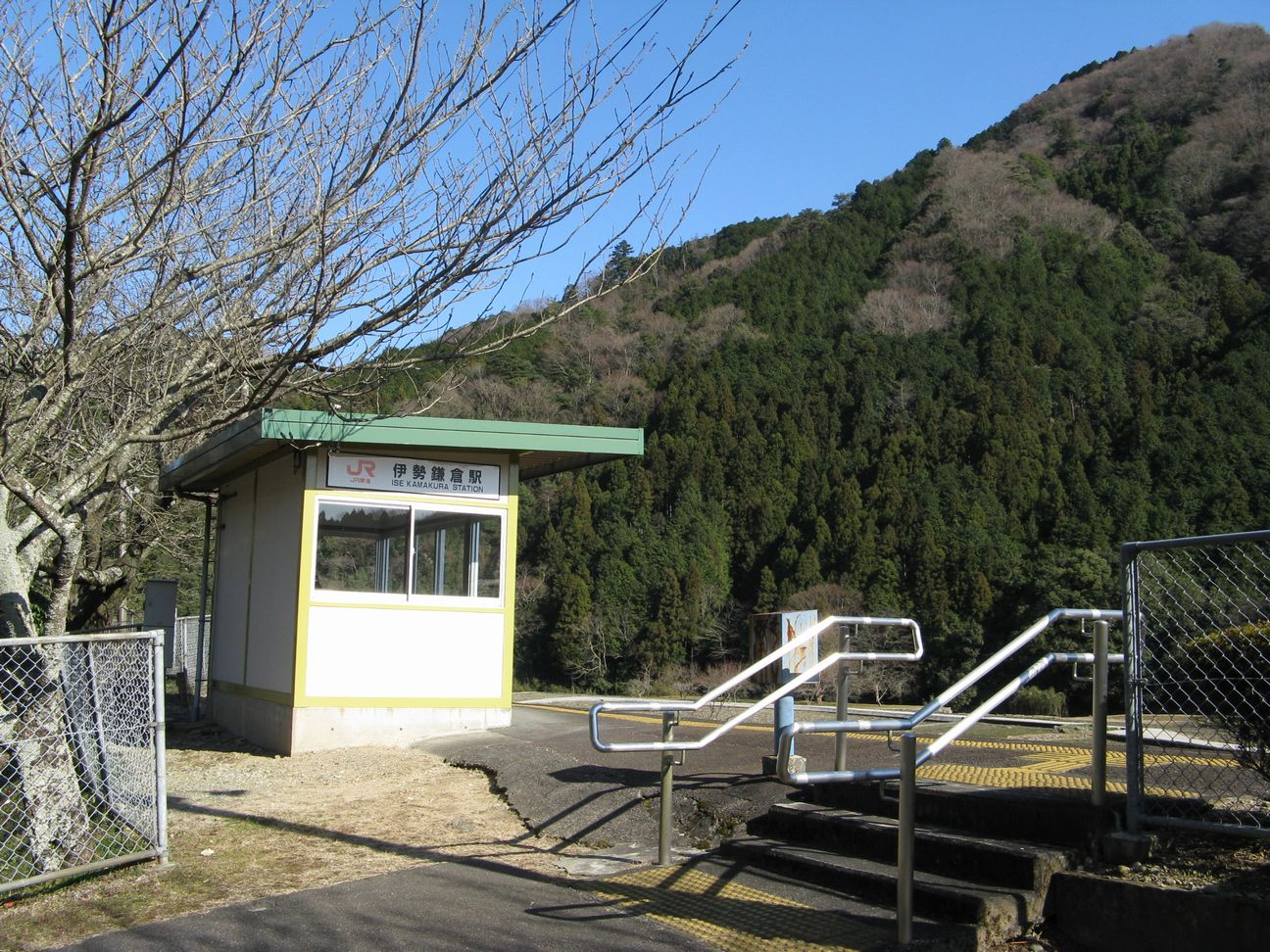
- Ise-Kamakura Station

General information
- Location: Misugi-cho Yachi, Tsu-shi, Mie-ken 515-3421; Japan
- Coordinates: 34.5743°N 136.2785°E
- Operator: JR Tōkai
- Line: ■ Meishō Line
- Distance: 33.8 km from Matsusaka
- Platforms: 1 side platform
- Connections: Bus terminal

History
- Opened: December 5, 1935

Passengers
- FY2019: 7 daily
Location
- Location within Mie Prefecture Location within Japan

Ise-Kamakura Station (伊勢鎌倉駅, Ise-Kamakura-eki) is a passenger railway station in located in the city of Tsu, Mie Prefecture, Japan, operated by Central Japan Railway Company (JR Tōkai).

== Lines ==
Ise-Kamakura Station is served by the Meishō Line, and is 33.8 rail kilometers from the terminus of the line at Matsusaka Station.

== Station layout ==
The station consists of a single side platform serving one bi-directional track.

== Adjacent stations ==
«	Service	»
Meishō Line
Ise-Takehara	Local	Ise-Yachi

== History ==
Ise-Kamakura Station was opened on December 5, 1935 as a station on the Japanese Government Railways (JGR) (which became the Japan National Railways (JNR) after World War II). Freight services were suspended from October 1965. The station has been unattended since April 1, 1986. Along with the division and privatization of JNR on April 1, 1987, the station came under the control and operation of the Central Japan Railway Company.

Between October 8, 2009 and March 26, 2016, the section between Ieki Station and Ise-Okitsu Station was closed due to damage from Typhoon Melor. During this time, a bus line served this station.

== Passenger statistics ==
In fiscal 2019, the station was used by an average of 7 passengers daily (boarding passengers only).

== Surrounding area ==
The station is located in a forested rural area.

== See also ==
- List of railway stations in Japan
