= Gongemmae Station =

Railway station in Matsusaka, Mie Prefecture, Japan

Gongemmae Station 権現前駅
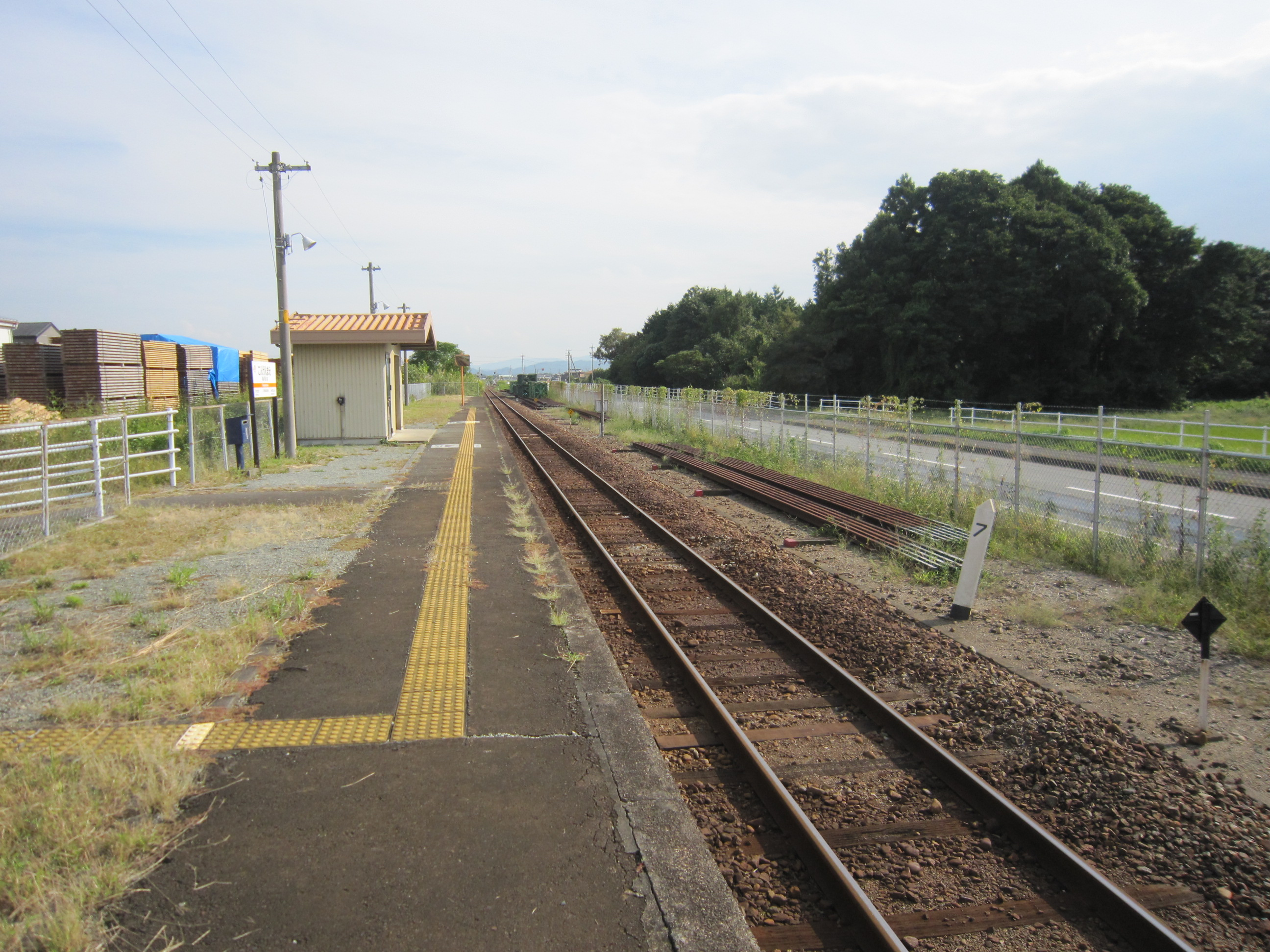
- Gongemmae Station

General information
- Location: Ureshino Gongmmae-cho 861, Matsusaka-shi, Mie-ken 515-2323; Japan
- Coordinates: 34.6179°N 136.4824°E
- Operator: JR Tōkai
- Line: ■ Meishō Line
- Distance: 7.0 km from Matsusaka
- Platforms: 1 side platform
- Connections: Bus terminal

History
- Opened: August 25, 1929

Passengers
- FY2019: 33 daily
Location
- Location within Mie Prefecture Location within Japan

Gongemmae Station (権現前駅, Gongemmae-eki) is a passenger railway station in located in the city of Matsusaka, Mie Prefecture, Japan, operated by Central Japan Railway Company (JR Tōkai).

== Lines ==
Gongemmae Station is served by the Meishō Line, and is 7.0 rail kilometers from the terminus of the line at Matsusaka Station.

== Station layout ==
The station consists of a single side platform serving bi-directional traffic. There is no station building, but only a rain shelter built directly on the platform. The station is unattended.

=== Platforms ===
1	■ Meishō Line	For Matsusaka; For Ise-Okitsu

== Adjacent stations ==
«	Service	»
Meishō Line
Kaminoshō	Local	Ise-Hata

== History ==
Gongemmae Station was opened on August 25, 1929, as a station on the Japanese Government Railways (JGR), which became the Japan National Railways (JNR) after World War II. Freight operations were discontinued in 1963. Along with its division and privatization of JNR on April 1, 1987, the station came under the control and operation of the Central Japan Railway Company.

== Passenger statistics ==
In fiscal 2019, the station was used by an average of 33 passengers daily (boarding passengers only).

== Surrounding area ==
- former Ureshino Town Hall
- Matsusaka City Ureshino Library
- Ureshino Social Welfare Center
- Ureshino Workers Gymnasium

== See also ==
- List of railway stations in Japan
