= Ise-Takehara Station =

Railway station in Tsu, Mie Prefecture, Japan

Ise-Takehara Station 伊勢竹原駅
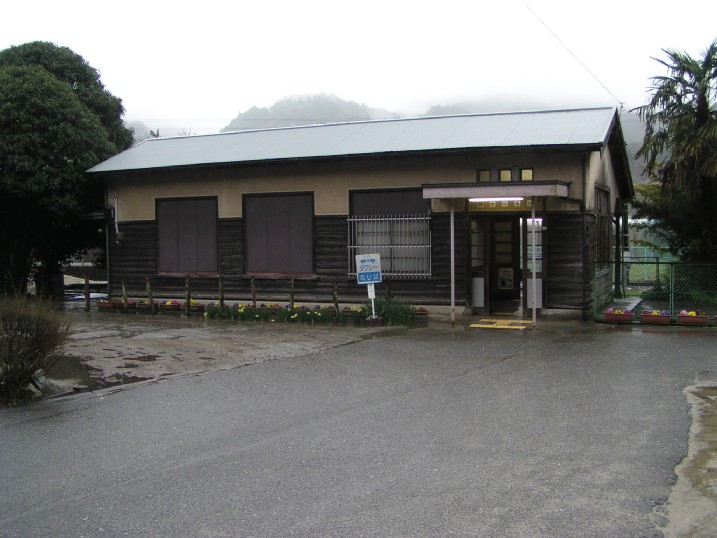
- Ise-Takehara Station

General information
- Location: Misugi-cho Takehara, Tsu-shi, Mie-ken 515-3201; Japan
- Coordinates: 34.5996°N 136.3084°E
- Operator: JR Tōkai
- Line: ■ Meishō Line
- Distance: 29.5 km from Matsusaka
- Platforms: 1 island platform
- Connections: Bus terminal

History
- Opened: December 5, 1935

Passengers
- FY2019: 10 daily
Location
- Location within Mie Prefecture Location within Japan

Ise-Takehara Station (伊勢竹原駅, Ise-Takehara-eki) is a passenger railway station in located in the city of Tsu, Mie Prefecture, Japan, operated by Central Japan Railway Company (JR Tōkai).

== Lines ==
Ise-Takehara Station is served by the Meishō Line, and is 29.5 rail kilometers from the terminus of the line at Matsusaka Station.

== Station layout ==
The station consists of a single island platform; however use of one side (platform 2) has been discontinued.

== Adjacent stations ==
«	Service	»
Meishō Line
Ieki	Local	Ise-Kamakura

== History ==
Ise-Takehara Station was opened on December 5, 1935 as a station on the Japanese Government Railways (JGR) (which became the Japan National Railways (JNR) after World War II). Freight services were suspended from October 1965. The station has been unattended since April 1, 1986. Along with the division and privatization of JNR on April 1, 1987, the station came under the control and operation of the Central Japan Railway Company.

Between 8 October 2009 and 26 March 2016, the section between Ieki Station and Ise-Okitsu Station was closed due to damage from Typhoon Melor. During this time, a bus line served this station.

== Passenger statistics ==
In fiscal 2019, the station was used by an average of 10 passengers daily (boarding passengers only).

== Surrounding area ==
- Kimigano Dam
- Misugi Onsen

== See also ==
- List of railway stations in Japan
