= Sekinomiya Station =

Railway station in Tsu, Mie Prefecture, Japan

Sekinomiya Station 関ノ宮駅
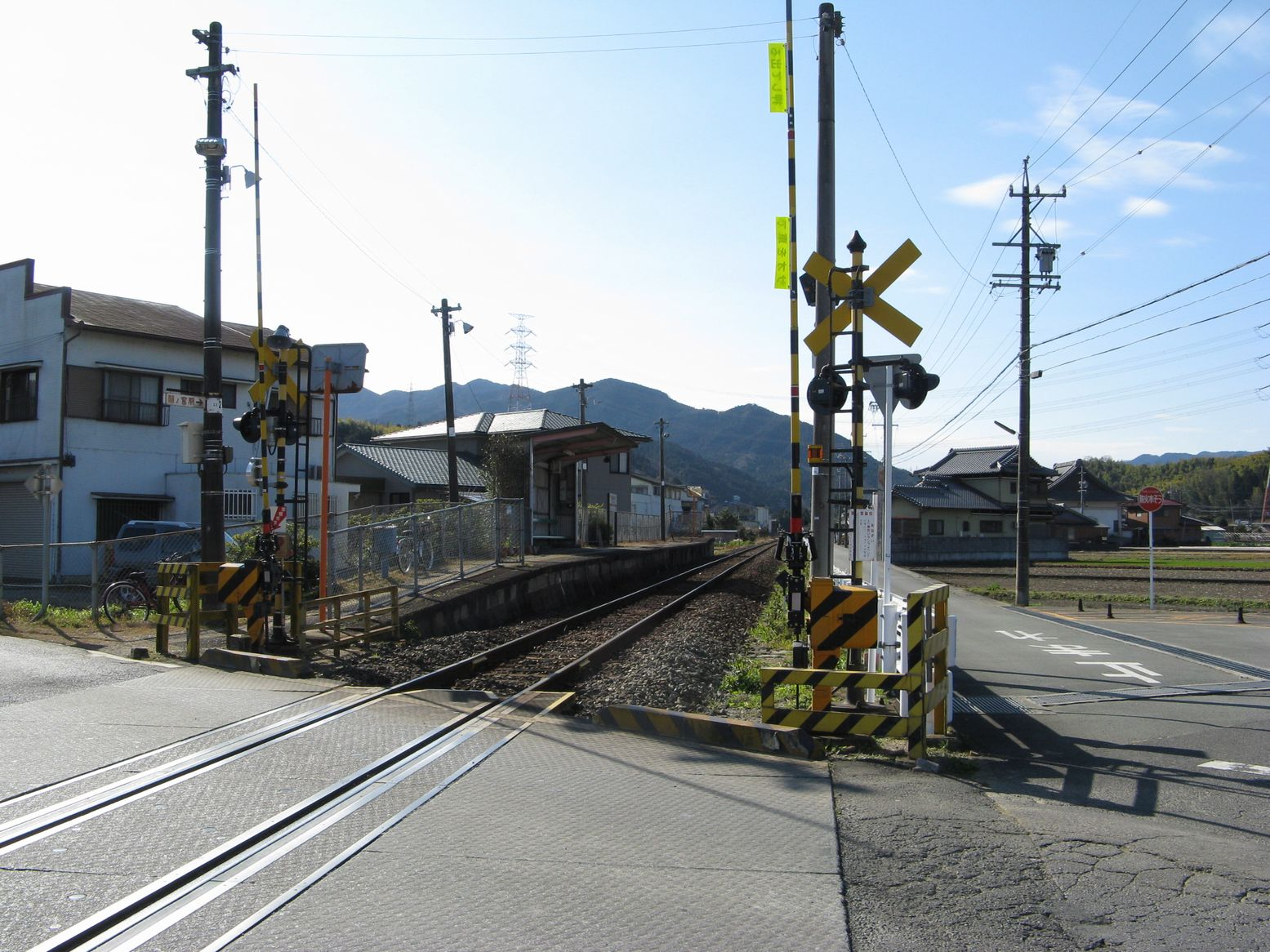
- Sekinomiya Station

General information
- Location: Hakusan-cho Kawaguchi 51, Tsu-shi, Mie-ken 515-2603; Japan
- Coordinates: 34.6375°N 136.3393°E
- Operator: JR Tōkai
- Line: ■ Meishō Line
- Distance: 23.3 km from Matsusaka
- Platforms: 1 side platform
- Connections: Bus terminal

History
- Opened: January 20, 1938

Passengers
- FY2019: 11 daily
Location
- Location within Mie Prefecture Location within Japan

Sekinomiya Station (関ノ宮駅, Sekinomiya-eki) is a passenger railway station in located in the city of Tsu, Mie Prefecture, Japan, operated by Central Japan Railway Company (JR Tōkai).

== Lines ==
Sekinomiya Station is served by the Meishō Line, and is 23.3 rail kilometers from the terminus of the line at Matsusaka Station.

== Station layout ==
The station consists of a single side platform serving bi-directional traffic. There is no station building, but only a rain shelter on the platform. The station is unattended.

=== Platforms ===
1	■ Meishō Line	For Matsusaka; For Ise-Okitsu

== Adjacent stations ==
«	Service	»
Meishō Line
Ise-Kawaguchi	Local	Ieki

== History ==
Sekinomiya Station was opened on January 20, 1938 as a station on the Japanese Government Railways (JGR) (which became the Japan National Railways (JNR) after World War II). Freight operations were discontinued in December 1951. Along with the division and privatization of JNR on April 1, 1987, the station came under the control and operation of the Central Japan Railway Company.

== Passenger statistics ==
In fiscal 2019, the station was used by an average of 11 passengers daily (boarding passengers only).

== Surrounding area ==
- Saikyo-ji
- former Hakusan Town Hall
- Tsu City Hakusan Junior High School
- Tsu Municipal Kawaguchi Elementary School

== See also ==
- List of railway stations in Japan
