= Kaminoshō Station =

Railway station in Matsusaka, Mie Prefecture, Japan

Kaminoshō Station 上ノ庄駅
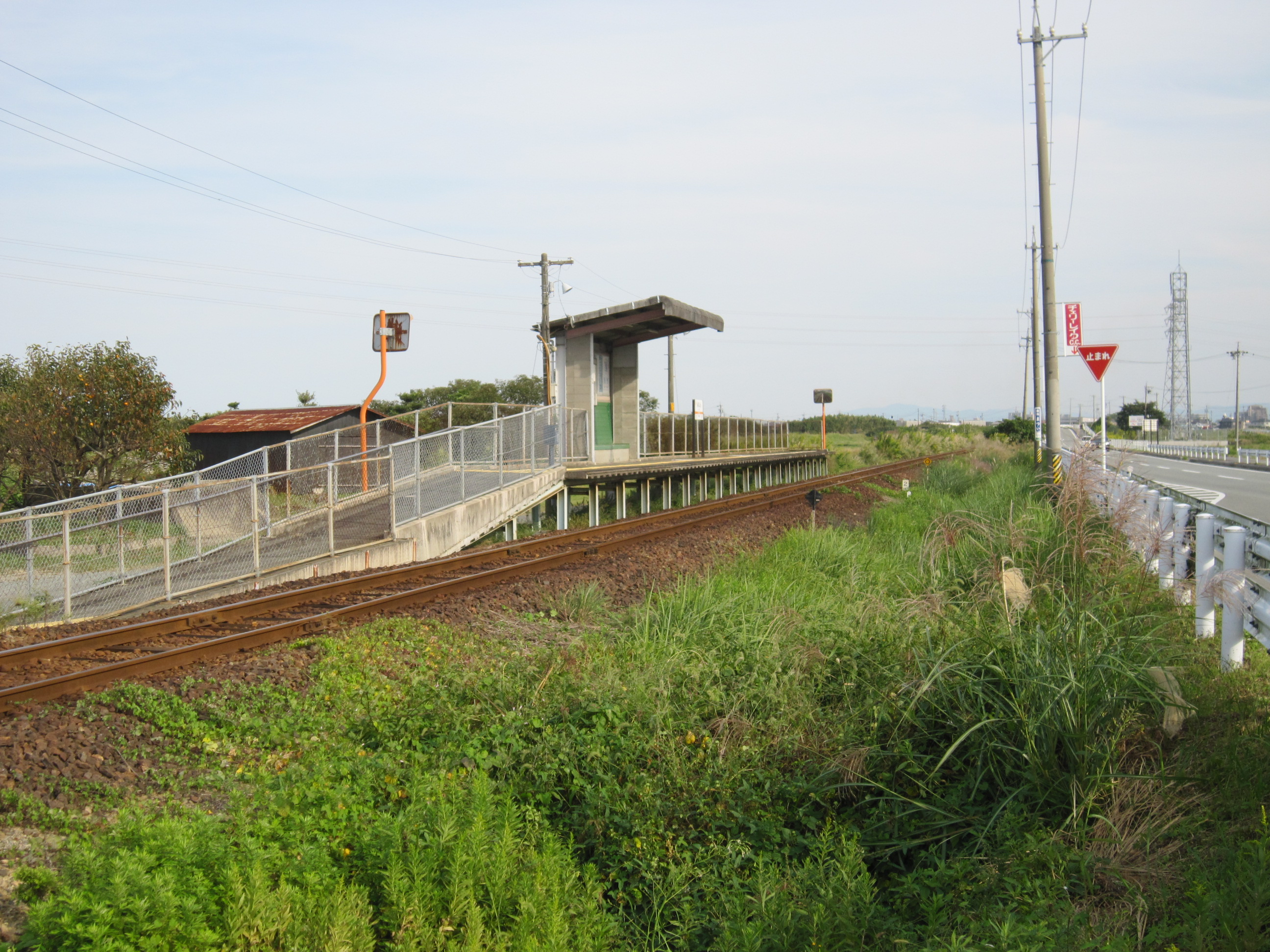
- Kaminoshō Station

General information
- Location: Kaminoshō-cho 865, Matsusaka-shi, Mie-ken 515-2123; Japan
- Coordinates: 34.5980°N 136.4994°E
- Operator: JR Tōkai
- Line: ■ Meishō Line
- Distance: 4.2 km from Matsusaka
- Platforms: 1 side platform
- Connections: Bus terminal

History
- Opened: August 1, 1960

Passengers
- FY2019: 6 daily
Location
- Location within Mie Prefecture Location within Japan

Kaminoshō Station (上ノ庄駅, Kaminoshō-eki) is a passenger railway station in located in the city of Matsusaka, Mie Prefecture, Japan, operated by Central Japan Railway Company (JR Tōkai).

== Lines ==
Kaminoshō Station is served by the Meishō Line, and is 4.2 rail kilometers from the terminus of the line at Matsusaka Station.

== Station layout ==
The station consists of a single side platform serving bi-directional traffic. There is no station building, but only a rain shelter built directly on the platform. The station is unattended.

=== Platforms ===
1	■ Meishō Line	For Matsusaka; For Ise-Okitsu

== Adjacent stations ==
«	Service	»
Meishō Line
Matsusaka	Local	Gongemmae

== History ==
Kaminoshō Station was opened on August 1, 1960 as a passenger station by Japan National Railways. Along with its division and privatization of JNR on April 1, 1987, the station came under the control and operation of the Central Japan Railway Company.

== Passenger statistics ==
In fiscal 2019, the station was used by an average of 6 passengers daily (boarding passengers only).

== Surrounding area ==
- Eizen-ji
- Wadakin Ranch

== See also ==
- List of railway stations in Japan
