= Ise-Kawaguchi Station =

Railway station in Tsu, Mie Prefecture, Japan

Ise-Kawaguchi Station 伊勢川口駅
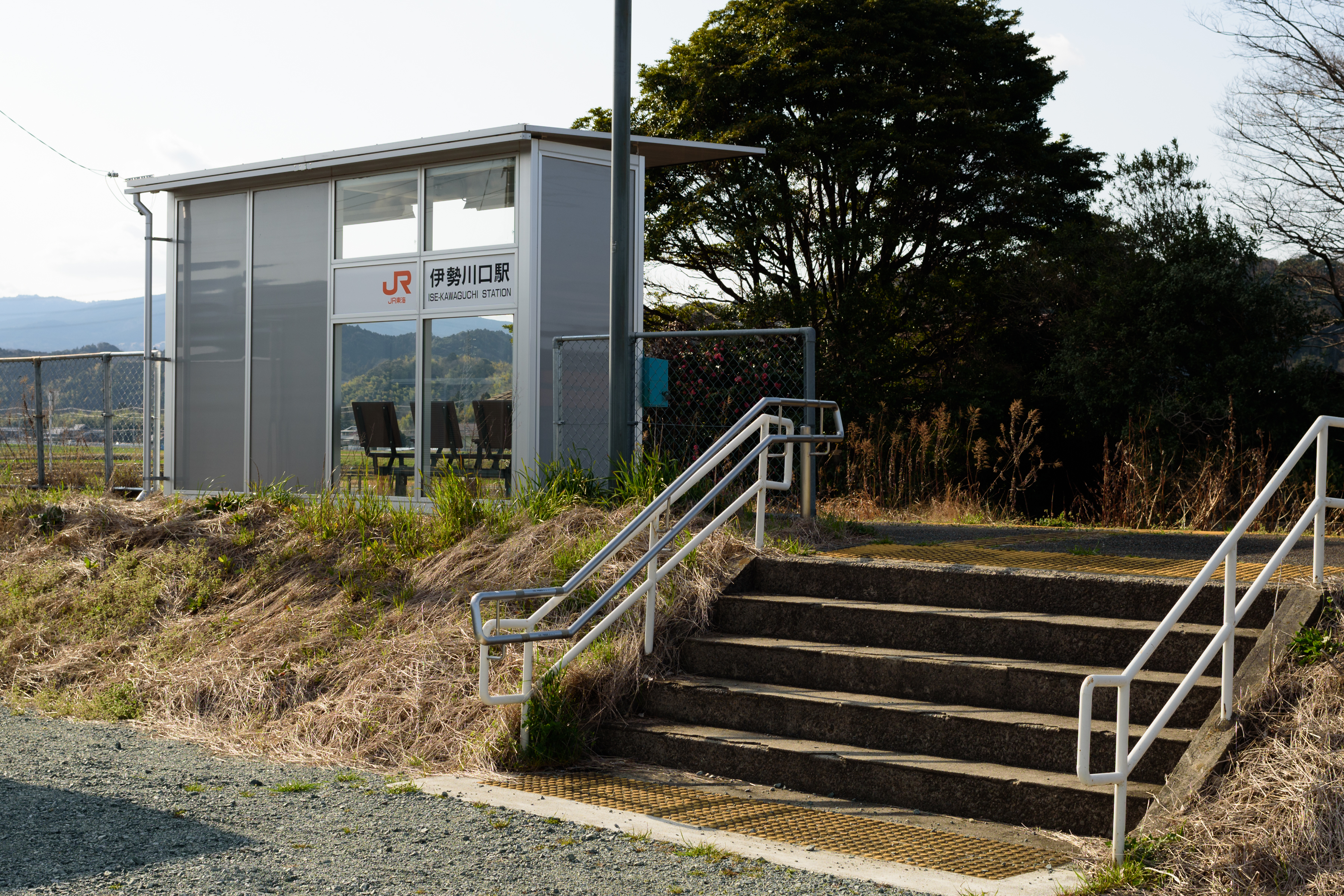
- Ise-Kawaguchi Station

General information
- Location: Hakusan-cho Kawaguchi 3274, Tsu-shi, Mie-ken 515-2603; Japan
- Coordinates: 34.6477°N 136.3565°E
- Operator: JR Tōkai
- Line: ■ Meishō Line
- Distance: 21.3 km from Matsusaka
- Platforms: 1 side platform
- Connections: Bus terminal

History
- Opened: November 27, 1925

Passengers
- FY2019: 11 daily
Location
- Location within Mie Prefecture Location within Japan

Ise-Kawaguchi Station (伊勢川口駅, Ise-Kawaguchi-eki)is a passenger railway station in located in the city of Tsu, Mie Prefecture, Japan, operated by Central Japan Railway Company (JR Tōkai).

== Lines ==
Ise-Kawaguchi Station is served by the Meishō Line, and is 21.3 rail kilometers from the terminus of the line at Matsusaka Station.

== Station layout ==
The station consists of a single side platform serving one bi-directional track. There is no station building, but only a rain shelter on the platform. The station is unattended.

=== Platforms ===
| 1 | ■ Meishō Line | For Matsusaka; For Ise-Okitsu |

== Adjacent stations ==
| « | Service | » |
Meishō Line
| Ise-Ōi | Local | Sekinomiya |

== History ==
Ise-Kawaguchi Station was opened on November 27, 1925, as a station on the privately owned Nakaise Railway. On September 11, 1931, the Japanese Government Railways (JGR) (which became the Japan National Railways (JNR) after World War II) connected to the station. The Nakaise Railway ceased operations from February 1, 1943. Freight operations were discontinued in October 1965. Along with the division and privatization of JNR on April 1, 1987, the station came under the control and operation of the Central Japan Railway Company.

== Passenger statistics ==
In fiscal 2019, the station was used by an average of 11 passengers daily (boarding passengers only).

== Surrounding area ==
- Tsu Municipal Kawaguchi Elementary School
- Sakakibara Onsen

== See also ==
- List of railway stations in Japan
