= Ise-Hata Station =

Railway station in Tsu, Mie Prefecture, Japan

Ise-Hata Station 伊勢八太駅
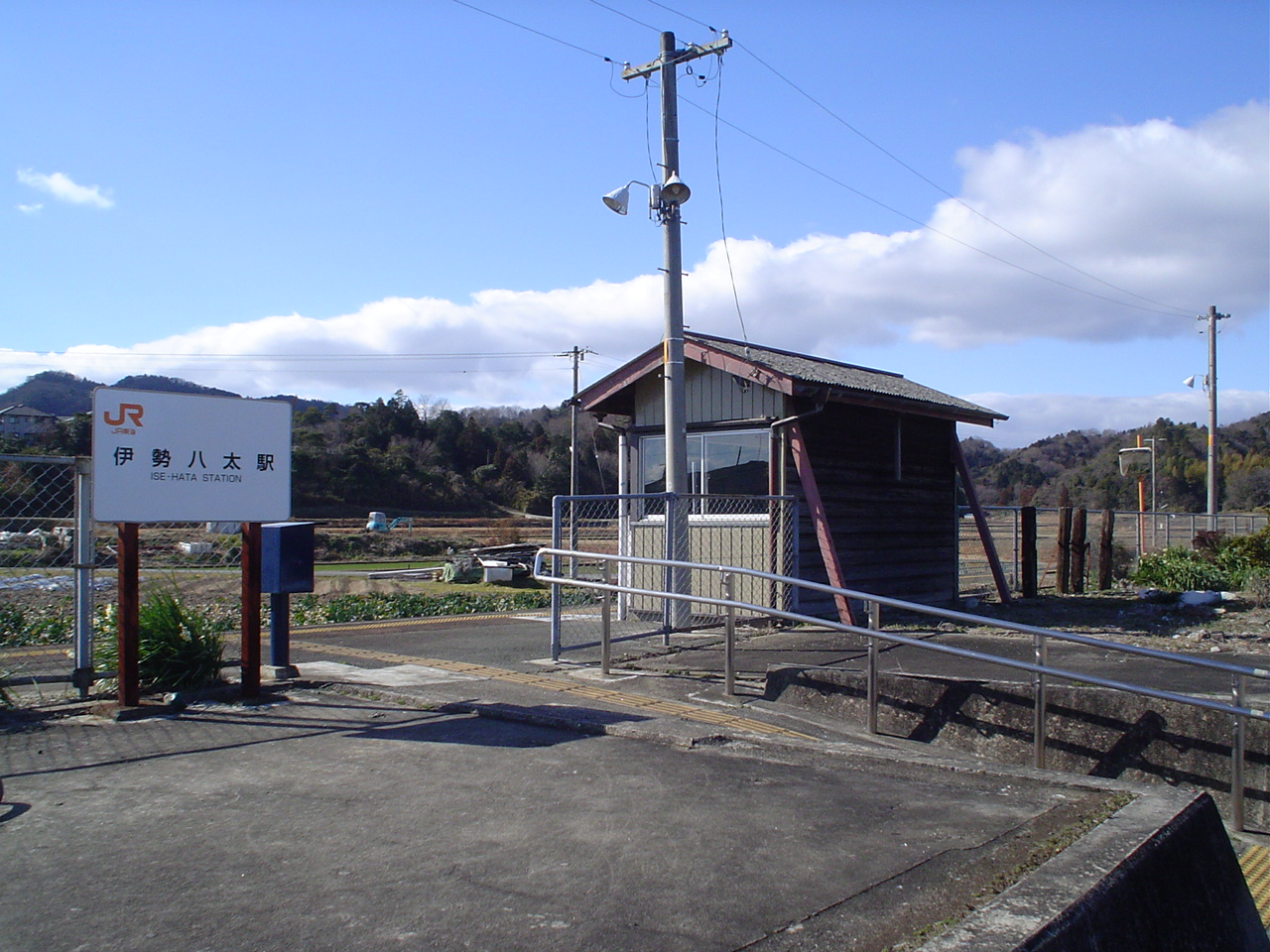
- Ise-Hata Station

General information
- Location: Ichishi-cho Oyama 4, Tsu-shi, Mie-ken 515-2515; Japan
- Coordinates: 34.6480°N 136.4468°E
- Operator: JR Tōkai
- Line: ■ Meishō Line
- Distance: 11.7 km from Matsusaka
- Platforms: 1 side platform
- Connections: Bus terminal

History
- Opened: March 30, 1930

Passengers
- FY2019: 21 daily
Location
- Location within Mie Prefecture Location within Japan

Ise-Hata Station (伊勢八太駅, Ise-Hata-eki) is a passenger railway station in located in the city of Tsu, Mie Prefecture, Japan, operated by Central Japan Railway Company (JR Tōkai).

== Lines ==
Ise-Hata Station is served by the Meishō Line, and is 11.7 rail kilometers from the terminus of the line at Matsusaka Station.

== Station layout ==
The station consists of a single side platform serving bi-directional traffic. There is no station building, but only a rain shelter built directly on the platform. The station is unattended.

=== Platforms ===
1	■ Meishō Line	For Matsusaka; For Ise-Okitsu

== Adjacent stations ==
«	Service	»
Meishō Line
Gongemmae	Local	Ichishi

== History ==
Ise-Hata Station was opened on March 30, 1930, as a station on the Japanese Government Railways (JGR), which became the Japan National Railways (JNR) after World War II. Freight operations were discontinued in 1963. Along with its division and privatization of JNR on April 1, 1987, the station came under the control and operation of the Central Japan Railway Company.

== Passenger statistics ==
In fiscal 2019, the station was used by an average of 21 passengers daily (boarding passengers only).

== See also ==
- List of railway stations in Japan
