= Meishō Line =

Railway line in Mie Prefecture, Japan

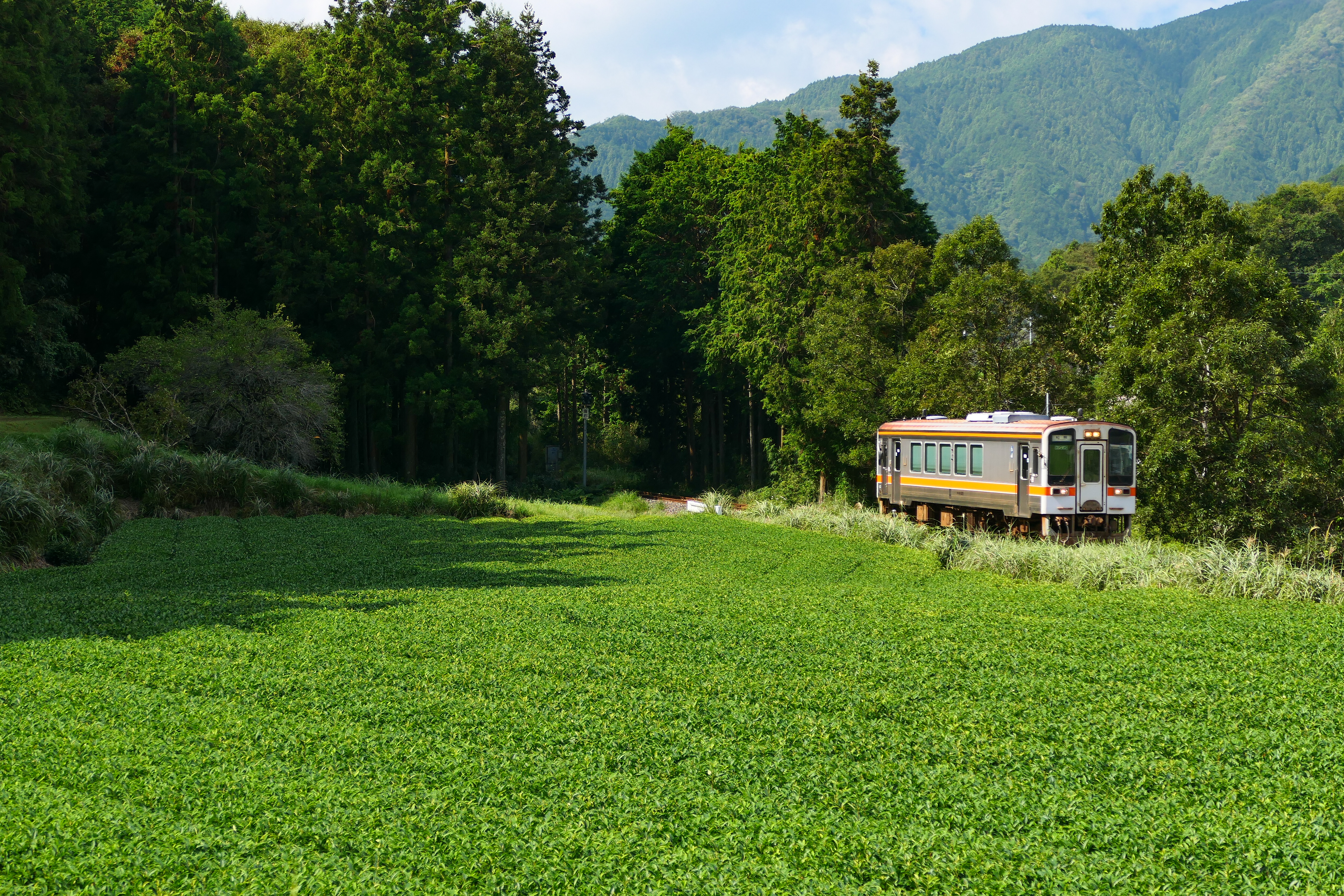
- KiHa 11 series DMU on the line in 2023

Overview
- Native name: 名松線
- Status: In operation
- Owner: JR Central
- Locale: Mie Prefecture
- Termini: Matsusaka; Ise-Okitsu
- Stations: 15

Service
- Type: Heavy rail
- Operator: JR Central
- Rolling stock: KiHa 11 series DMU

History
- Opened: 25 August 1929; 97 years ago
- Last extension: 5 December 1935

Technical
- Line length: 43.5 km (27.0 mi)
- Number of tracks: Entire line single tracked
- Character: Rural
- Track gauge: 1,067 mm (3 ft 6 in)
- Electrification: None
- Operating speed: 65 km/h (40 mph)

The Meishō Line (名松線, Meishō-sen) is a rural, regional railway line of Central Japan Railway Company (JR Central) in Mie Prefecture, Japan, connecting Matsusaka station in Matsusaka and Ise-Okitsu station in Tsu.

The line takes its name from the kanji characters of the cities of Nabari (名張) and Matsusaka (松阪). Although this line was planned to connect them, the section from Ise-Okitsu to Nabari was never built, due to the prior completion of the present Kintetsu Osaka Line.

== History ==
The line was mentioned in the Railway Construction Act in 1922, which was a list of proposed railway lines to be constructed in the future. The line was a part of the proposed line that would have connected Sakurai, Nara, Nabari, and Matsusaka. The section between Matsusaka and Ieki opened in stages between 1929 and 1931. The first section to Gongemmae opened on 25 August 1929, then to Isegi in 1930, and to Ieki in 1931. The line was eventually extended to Ise-Okitsu in 1935. In 1930, the Sankyu Rapid Electric Railway opened a different railway route connecting Nabari and Matsusaka, resulting in the line not being extended any further. Because the line failed to connect the two cities, it suffered from ridership decline. Diesel multiple units began running on the line in 1934. Freight services ceased in 1965. An unmanned train descended down the line twice in 2006 and 2009. This resulted in the Ministry of Land, Infrastructure, Transport and Tourism issuing a warning against JR Central. In response, the company limited the number of drivers in the line to 20, and instructed them to use an additional brake for safety.

The closure of the line has been discussed multiple times, with the first taking place during the Deficit 83 lines movement in 1968 and the second specified local lines selection of lines, but was never closed due to the poor road conditions in the area. The closure was discussed again in October 2009, when Typhoon Melor struck the area and washed out over 40 sections between Ieki and Ise-Okitsu, but the line reopened on March 26, 2016 with help from passing municipalities. A Mie Kotsu bus service directly connected Nabari Station and Ise-Okitsu, although this service was abolished in 2021.

== Service ==
The Meishō Line is a rural line in the inland of Mie Prefecture. There are eight return workings a day. All trains are Local driver-only services and stop at every station. There are no limited-stop services such as rapids. Services are nearly always formed of single-car KiHa 11 series DMUs, though two cars may occasionally be used during events or busy seasons.

== Infrastructure ==
=== Stations list ===
Station		Date opened	Distance (km)		Transfers	Location
English	Japanese	Date opened	Between Stations	Total	Transfers	Location
Matsusaka	松阪	31 December 1893	-	0.0	Kisei Main Line; Kintetsu: Yamada Line	Matsusaka
Kaminoshō	上ノ庄	1 August 1960	4.2	4.2		Matsusaka
Gongemmae	権現前	25 August 1929	2.8	7.0		Matsusaka
Ise-Hata	伊勢八太	30 March 1930	4.7	11.7		Tsu
Ichishi	一志	20 January 1938; As Ise-Tajiri	1.3	13.0		Tsu
Isegi	井関	30 March 1930	2.6	15.6		Tsu
Ise-Ōi	伊勢大井	20 January 1938	2.9	18.5		Tsu
Ise-Kawaguchi	伊勢川口	11 September 1931	2.8	21.3		Tsu
Sekinomiya	関ノ宮	20 January 1938	2.0	23.3		Tsu
Ieki	家城	11 September 1931	2.5	25.8		Tsu
Ise-Takehara	伊勢竹原	5 December 1935	3.7	29.5		Tsu
Ise-Kamakura	伊勢鎌倉	5 December 1935	4.3	33.8		Tsu
Ise-Yachi	伊勢八知	5 December 1935	2.8	36.6		Tsu
Hitsu	比津	5 December 1935	3.1	39.7		Tsu
Ise-Okitsu	伊勢奥津	5 December 1935	3.8	43.5		Tsu

=== Rolling stock ===
- KiHa 11 series (primarily KiHa 11-300)
- KiHa 25 series
