= Itonuki Station =

Railway station in Motosu, Gifu Prefecture, Japan

Itonuki Station 糸貫駅
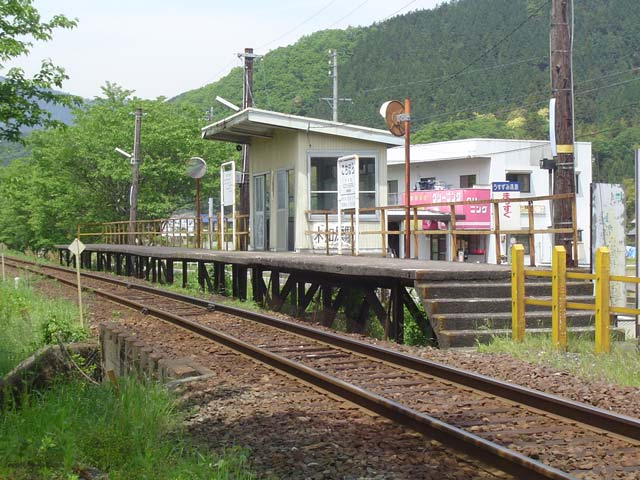
- Kochibora Station in May 2005

General information
- Location: Minobe, Motosu-shi, Gifu-ken 501-0413; Japan
- Coordinates: 35°27′46.40″N 136°40′10.93″E
- Operator: Tarumi Railway
- Line: ■ Tarumi Line
- Distance: 13.4 km from Ōgaki
- Platforms: 1 side platform
- Tracks: 1

Other information
- Status: Unstaffed
- Website: Official website (in Japanese)

History
- Opened: March 20, 1956
Location
- Location within Gifu Prefecture Location within Japan

Itonuki Station (糸貫駅, Itonuki-eki) is a railway station in the city of Motosu, Gifu Prefecture, Japan, operated by the private railway operator Tarumi Railway.

== Lines ==
Itonuki Station is a station on the Tarumi Line, and is located 13.4 rail kilometers from the terminus of the line at Ōgaki.

== Station layout ==
Itonuki Station has one ground-level side platform serving a single bi-directional track. The station is unattended.

== Adjacent stations ==
«	Service	»
Tarumi Railway
Tarumi Line
Morera-Gifu	-	Motosu

== History ==
Itonuki Station opened on March 20, 1956.

== Surrounding area ==
The station is located in a rural area surrounded by farms.

== See also ==
- List of railway stations in Japan
