= Itoizawa Station =

Railway station in Akkeshi, Hokkaido, Japan

Coordinates: 43°06′13″N 144°55′32″E

Itoizawa Station 糸魚沢駅
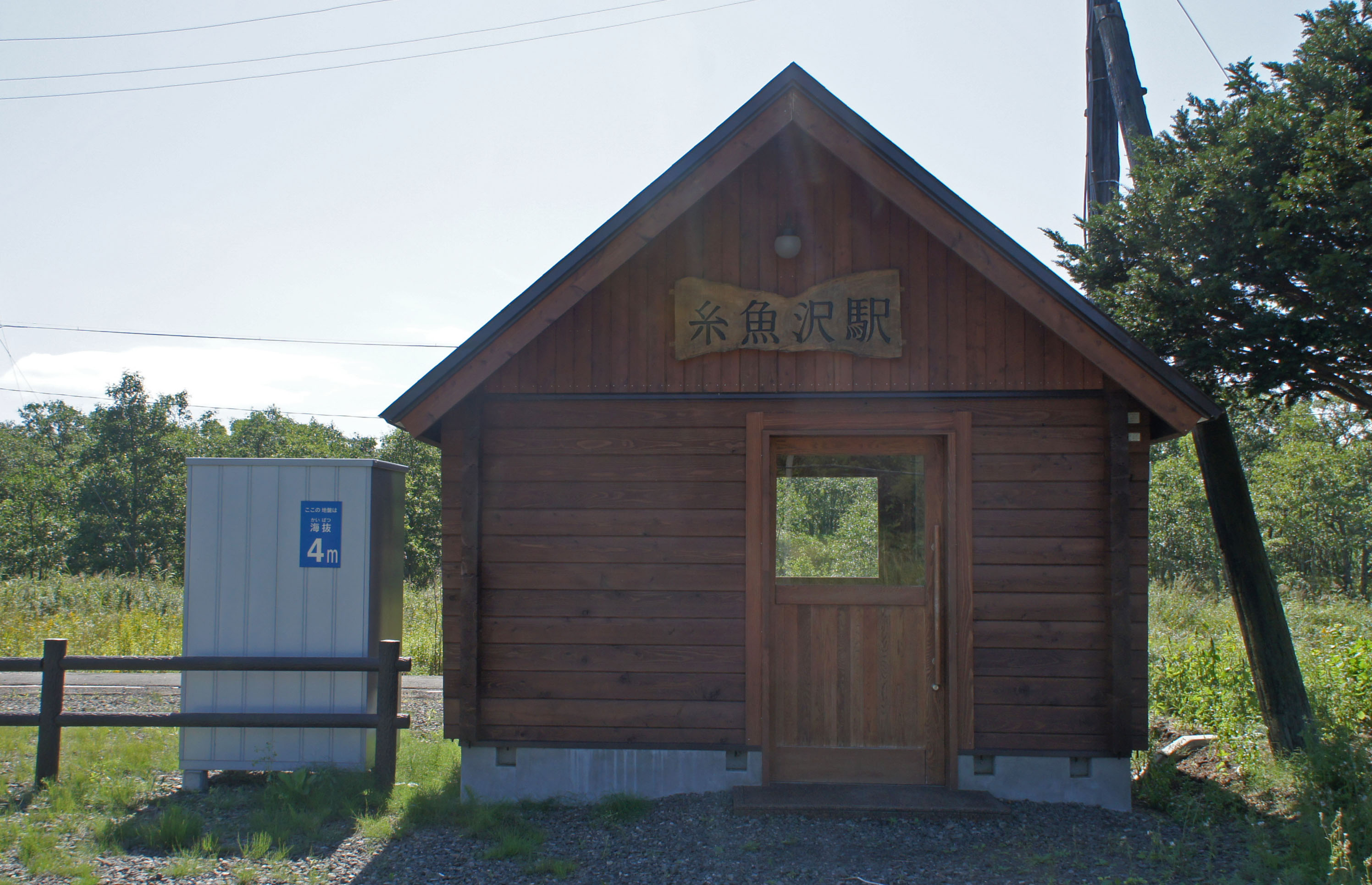
- The station building in September 2018

General information
- Location: Akkeshi-chō, Hokkaido; Japan
- Operator: Hokkaido Railway Company
- Line: ■ Nemuro Main Line
- Distance: 365.6 km from Takikawa

Other information
- Status: Closed

History
- Opened: 25 November 1919
- Closed: 12 March 2022
Location
- Location within Japan

Itoizawa Station (糸魚沢駅, Itoizawa-eki) was a railway station on the "Hanasaki Line" section of the JR Hokkaido Nemuro Main Line. Located in Akkeshi, Akkeshi District, Kushiro Subprefecture, Hokkaidō, Japan, it opened at Nov. 25, 1919, and closed on Mar. 12, 2022.
