= Ieki Station =

Railway station in Tsu, Mie Prefecture, Japan

Ieki Station 家城駅
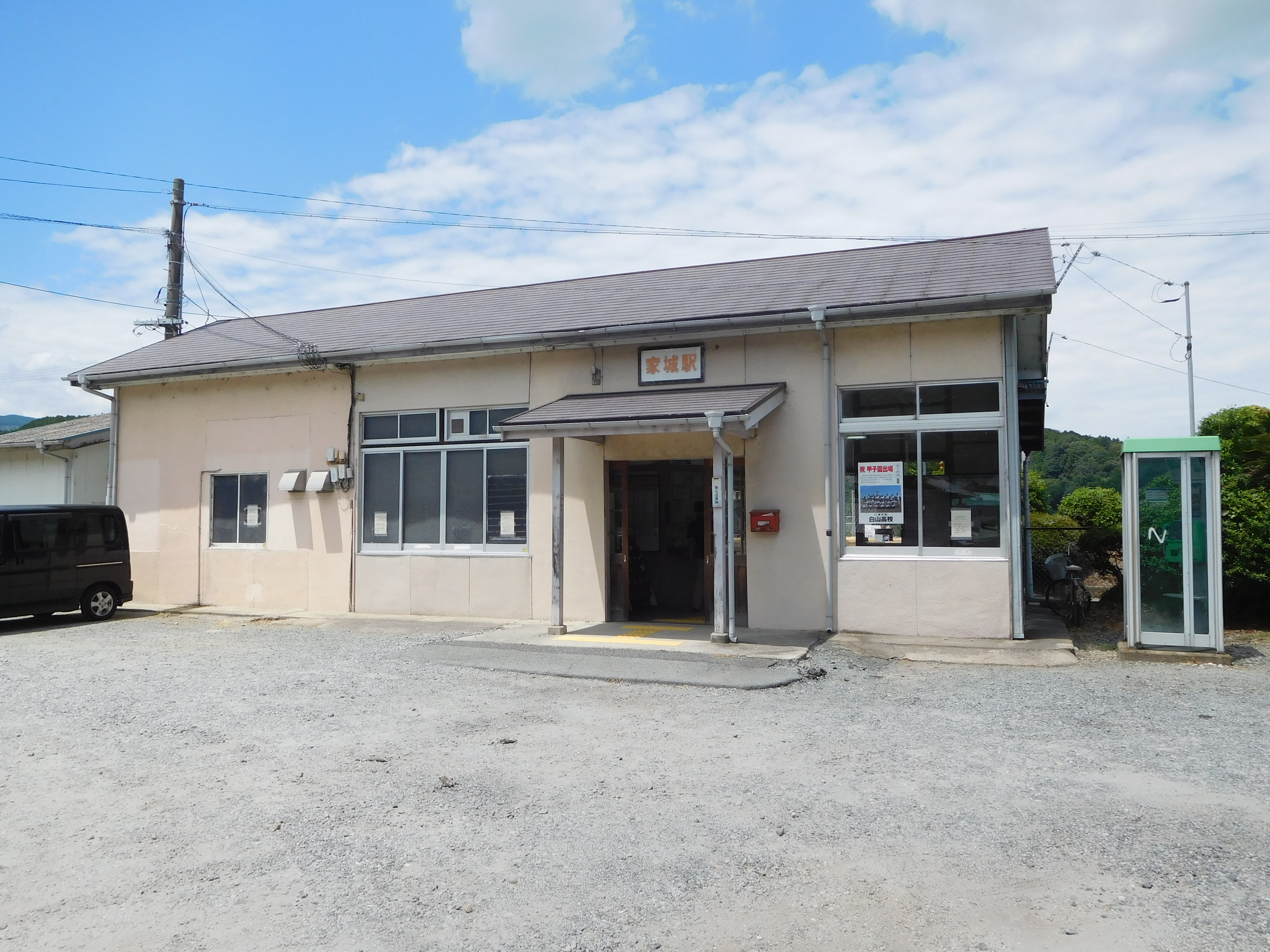
- Ieki Station, August 2018

General information
- Location: Hakusan-cho Minami-Ieki 874, Tsu-shi, Mie-ken 515-3133; Japan
- Coordinates: 34.6259°N 136.3191°E
- Operator: JR Tōkai
- Line: ■ Meishō Line
- Distance: 25.8 km from Matsusaka
- Platforms: 2 side platforms
- Connections: Bus terminal

History
- Opened: September 11, 1931

Passengers
- FY2019: 232 daily
Location
- Location within Mie Prefecture Location within Japan

Ieki Station (家城駅, Ieki-eki) is a passenger railway station in located in the city of Tsu, Mie Prefecture, Japan, operated by Central Japan Railway Company (JR Tōkai).

== Lines ==
Ieki Station is served by the Meishō Line, and is 25.8 rail kilometers from the terminus of the line at Matsusaka Station.

== Station layout ==
The station consists of two opposed side platforms connected by a level crossing. However, from October 8, 2009 to 26 March, 2016, platform 2 was not used.

=== Platforms ===
1	■ Meishō Line	For Matsusaka
2	■ Meishō Line	For Ise-Okitsu

== Adjacent stations ==
«	Service	»
Meishō Line
Sekinomiya	Local	Ise-Takehara

== History ==
Ieki Station was opened on September 11, 1931 as a station on the Japanese Government Railways (JGR) (which became the Japan National Railways (JNR) after World War II). Until December 5, 1935, the station was the terminus of the line. Along with the division and privatization of JNR on April 1, 1987, the station came under the control and operation of the Central Japan Railway Company.

There were two incidents of train runaway involving this station on August 20, 2006, and April 19, 2009. In both cases an empty railcar left Ieki Station when the driver failed to park the railcar properly, and was found about eight kilometers away (between Isegi and Ise-Ōi stations). There were no casualties from either of the incidents.

Between October 8, 2009 and March 26, 2016, the section between Ieki and Ise-Okitsu was closed due to the damages incurred from Typhoon Melor. During this time, a bus service ran between the stations.

== Passenger statistics ==
In fiscal 2019, the station was used by an average of 232 passengers daily (boarding passengers only).

== Surrounding area ==
- Mie Prefectural Hakusan High School
- Ieki Post Office
- Iejo Castle Ruins

== See also ==
- List of railway stations in Japan
