= Typhoon Melor (2009) =

Pacific typhoon in 2009

Typhoon Melor (Quedan)
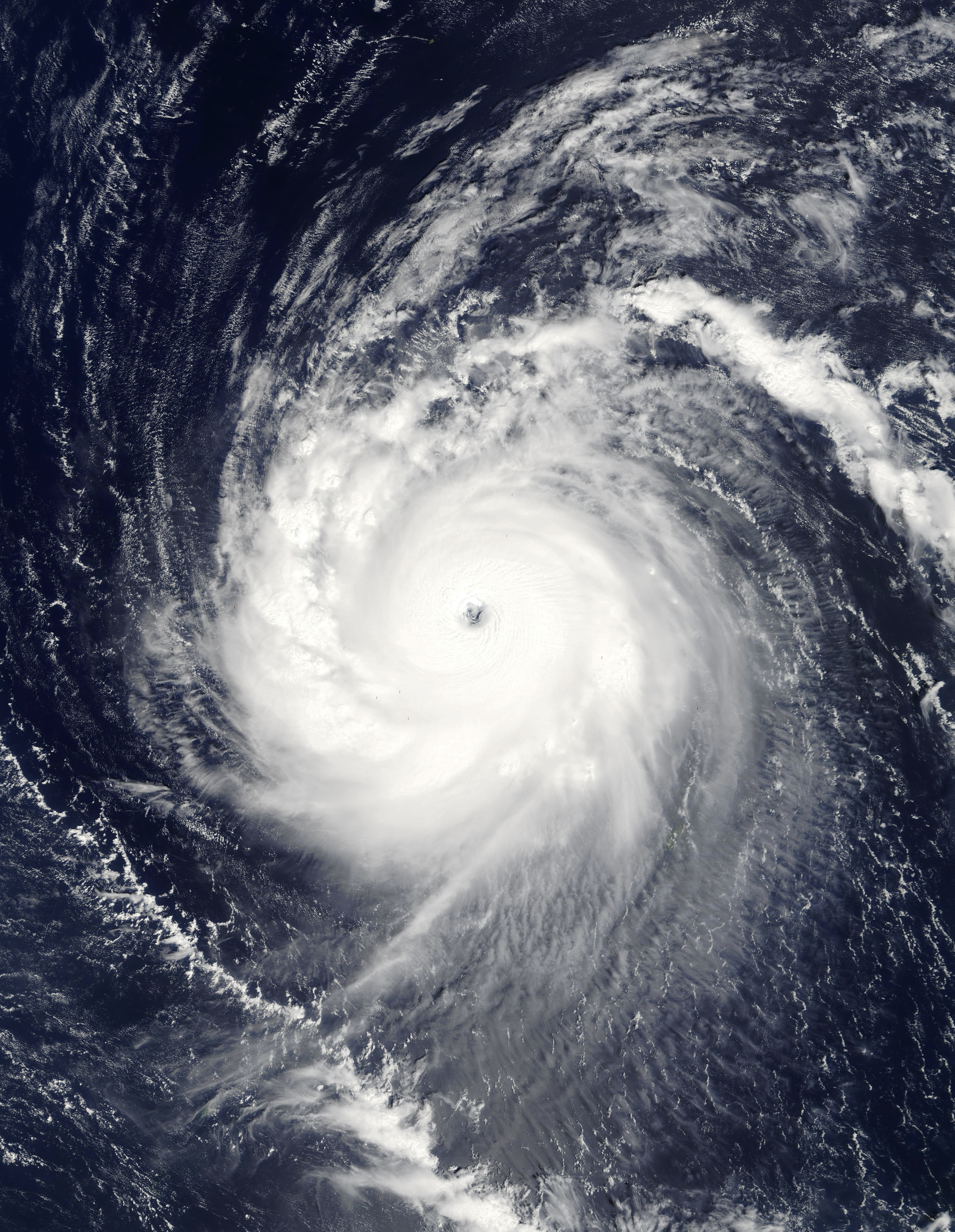
- Melor prior to peak intensity on October 4

Meteorological history
- Formed: September 29, 2009
- Extratropical: October 8, 2009
- Dissipated: October 11, 2009

Violent typhoon
- 10-minute sustained (JMA)
- Highest winds: 205 km/h (125 mph)
- Lowest pressure: 910 hPa (mbar); 26.87 inHg

Category 5-equivalent super typhoon
- 1-minute sustained (SSHWS/JTWC)
- Highest winds: 280 km/h (175 mph)
- Lowest pressure: 911 hPa (mbar); 26.90 inHg

Overall effects
- Fatalities: 3 total
- Damage: $1.5 billion (2009 USD)
- Areas affected: Mariana Islands, Japan, Philippines, California
- IBTrACS
- Part of the 2009 Pacific typhoon season

Typhoon Melor, (Note: The name Melor (Malay: melor, [məˈlor]) was contributed by Malaysia and refers to the Arabian jasmine (Jasminum sambac) in Malay.) known in the Philippines as Typhoon Quedan, was a powerful typhoon that hit Japan in early October 2009, causing significant damage. As part of the 2009 Pacific typhoon season, Melor formed as a tropical depression on September 29 and rapidly intensified into a Category 4-equivalent typhoon just three days later. Subsequently, on October 4, Melor became the second Category 5-equivalent super typhoon to form in the season. During the next days, the typhoon would interact with Typhoon Parma southeast of Taiwan, causing Parma to be almost stationary over northern Luzon and drop near-records of rainfall there. Afterwards, Melor gradually weakened in its approach to Japan, making landfall on October 7. As the storm exited Japan during the next day, it transitioned into an extratropical cyclone. The remnants of Melor were absorbed by a newly-formed extratropical cyclone near Alaska, which strengthened significantly and impacted the West Coast of the United States on October 13.

Following the typhoon, Melor caused 3 fatalities and $1.5 billion (2009 USD) in monetary damages in Japan.

== Meteorological history ==
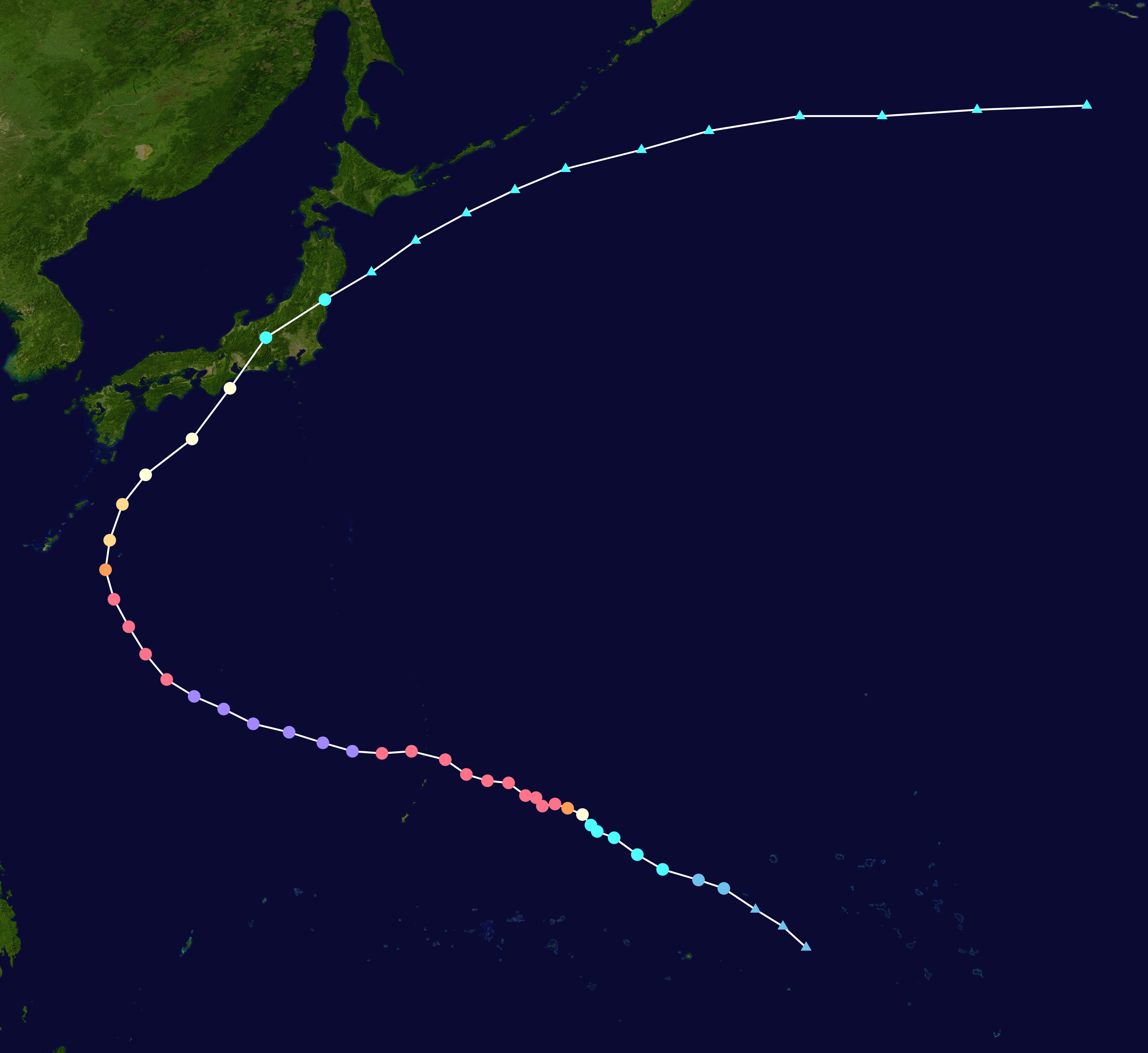
Map plotting the storm's track and intensity, according to the Saffir–Simpson scale Map key Saffir–Simpson scale Tropical depression (≤38 mph, ≤62 km/h) Tropical storm (39–73 mph, 63–118 km/h) Category 1 (74–95 mph, 119–153 km/h) Category 2 (96–110 mph, 154–177 km/h) Category 3 (111–129 mph, 178–208 km/h) Category 4 (130–156 mph, 209–251 km/h) Category 5 (≥157 mph, ≥252 km/h) Unknown Storm type Tropical cyclone Subtropical cyclone Extratropical cyclone, remnant low, tropical disturbance, or monsoon depression

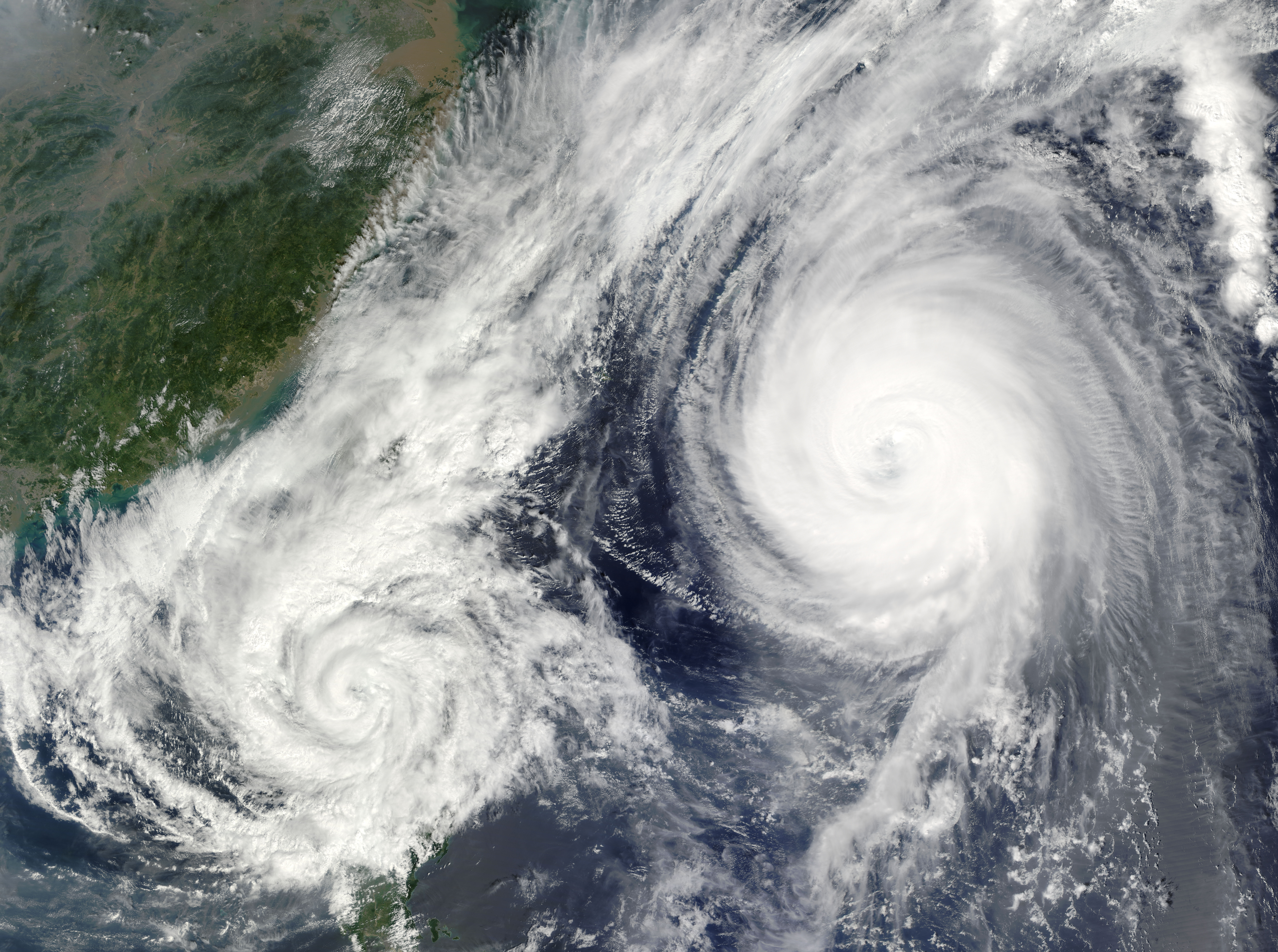
Typhoon Melor fujiwara with tropical storm Parma

Early on September 27, the Joint Typhoon Warning Center (JTWC) reported that an area of deep convection had persisted about 500 mi (310 km) south of the Kwajalein Atoll and was starting to consolidate around a poorly defined low level circulation center. During the next day, the system gradually developed, as satellite imagery showed a low-level circulation center had begun to form. On the evening of that day, due to a tropical upper tropospheric trough (TUTT) that was providing good outflow for the system and low level vertical wind shear with a favorable environment, JTWC released a Tropical Cyclone Formation Alert, noting that fragmented banding was now wrapping into the western side of the low level circulation center. Early on September 29, the Japan Meteorological Agency (JMA) upgraded the system to a tropical depression. The JTWC followed suit later that day, assigning the designation of 20W to the system, despite it having a poorly defined low level circulation center. Later that day, the depression's convection had improved and was now wrapping into the southern side of the low level circulation center. As a result, both the JTWC and the JMA upgraded the tropical depression to a tropical storm, with the JMA naming it as Melor. An anticyclone to the northeast of the system and an eastward outflow channel into a tropical upper tropospheric trough were providing good outflow for Melor.

Early on October 1, intensification continued, and the JMA reported that Melor became a typhoon. By the afternoon of the same day, the JTWC followed suit and upgraded Melor into a typhoon. In just four hours, it intensified rapidly to a Category 3-equivalent typhoon, and continued to track towards northeast Luzon. Early on October 2, it strengthened to a Category 4-equivalent typhoon. After leveling out in intensity, it strengthened again on October 3. Early October 4, the JTWC reported that Melor had intensified to a Category-5 equivalent super typhoon, with JMA reporting a central pressure of 910 hPa and winds of 205 km/h. On October 5, PAGASA allocated the name Quedan to the typhoon as the storm moved into Philippine's area of responsibility. It interacted with Typhoon Parma in Parma's second landfall in the Philippines. By the midday of October 8, Melor made landfall on Japan. After landfall, JMA downgraded Melor into a severe tropical storm, while the JTWC downgraded it into an extratropical storm. Late on October 11, the extratropical remnants of Melor were completely absorbed by a newly formed extratropical storm to the north, near Alaska. The new extratropical storm then strengthened into a powerful storm, which then began to impact the west coast of the United States, late on October 13.

== Preparations ==
Late on September 30, the island of Guam, was placed under a tropical storm warning, while the islands of Rota, Tinian and Saipan were placed under a typhoon watch. These warnings stayed in force until late on October 1, when the islands of Tinian and Saipan were placed under a typhoon warning. The warnings for the islands of Rota, Agrihan and Guam were also revised at this time with Rota and Agrihan placed under typhoon watches and tropical storm warnings, while Guam was placed under a tropical storm warning. Late the next day the warnings were once again revised with the tropical storm warning for Guam and while the typhoon watch was cancelled for both Rota and Agrihan, with Agrihan placed under a typhoon warning. Rotas remaining tropical storm warning was then cancelled early on October 3, before all of the warnings were cancelled later that day as Melor moved away from the Mariana Islands.

=== Japan ===
The Japan Meteorological Agency forecast that Typhoon Melor would make landfall near Tokyo on October 8 (Thursday). Weather forecasters issued warnings about strong winds and high waves on the sea. Melor moved with wind speeds of 252 kilometers per hour (156 mph) and bore down on the island of Minami Daito. Typhoon Melor, which was located at 512 km (318 mi) from the southeast of Naha in Okinawa on October 6 at 12 p.m. Japan time, was predicted to be on a path for Tokyo. The Japan Meteorological Agency forecast that the typhoon would have a speed of 180 kilometers per hour (112 mph) near its center. An official at the agency warned residents that the typhoon could bring very strong winds and high sea waves.

== Impact and aftermath ==
=== Mariana Islands ===
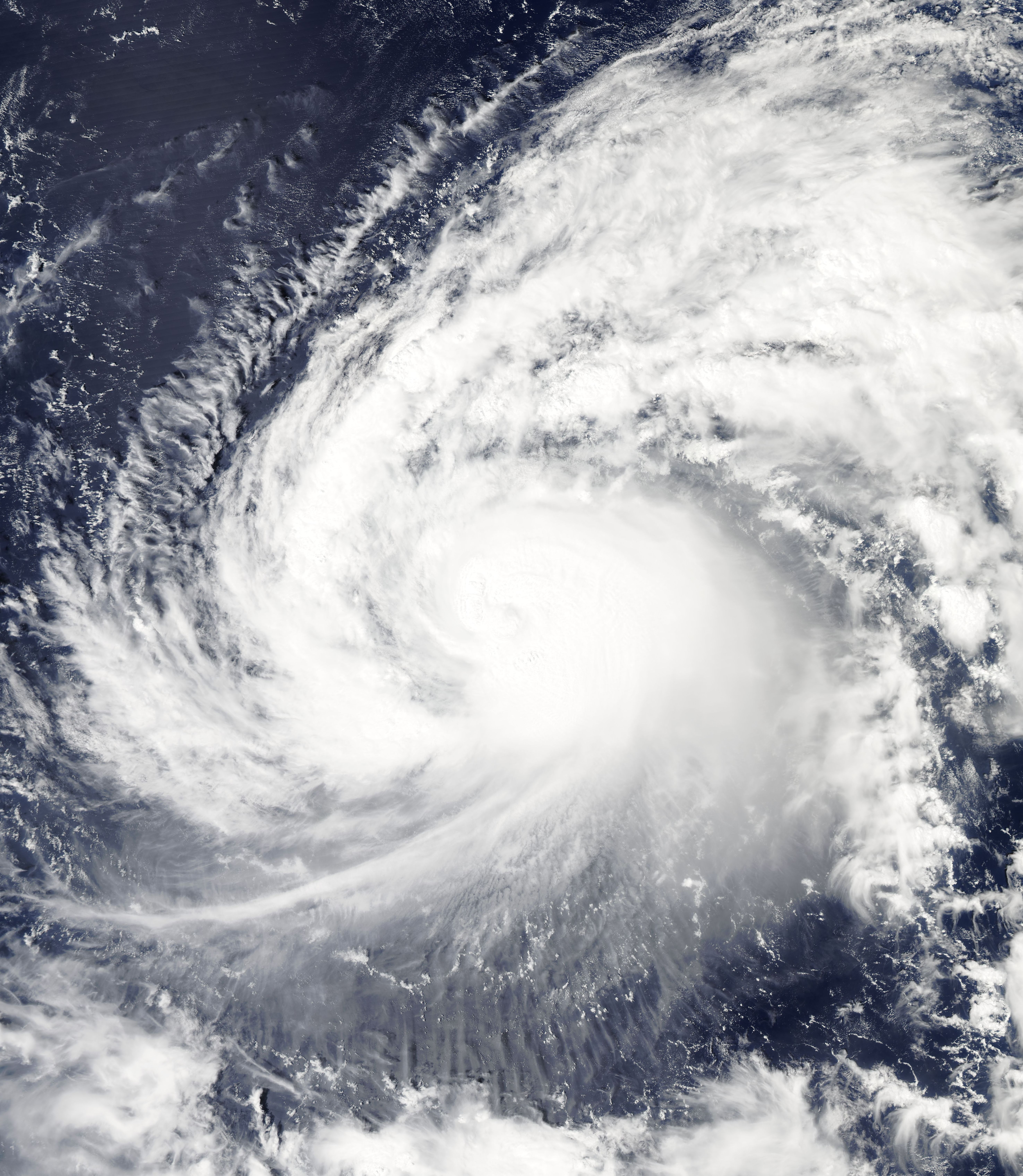
Typhoon Melor near the Mariana Islands on October 3

Although a very powerful typhoon during its passage of the Mariana Islands, Melor produced little damage in the region. The main effects were minor flooded from heavy rainfall in Saipan. High winds also downed a few power lines and trees; however, no structural damage was reported. Roughly 2.5 in (64 mm) of rain fell on the island during the passage of Melor, including 2 in (51 mm) during a six-hour span. At the height of the storm, roughly 500 residences were without power on Tinian and Saipan; this was quickly reduced to 90 residences within several hours.

=== Japan ===
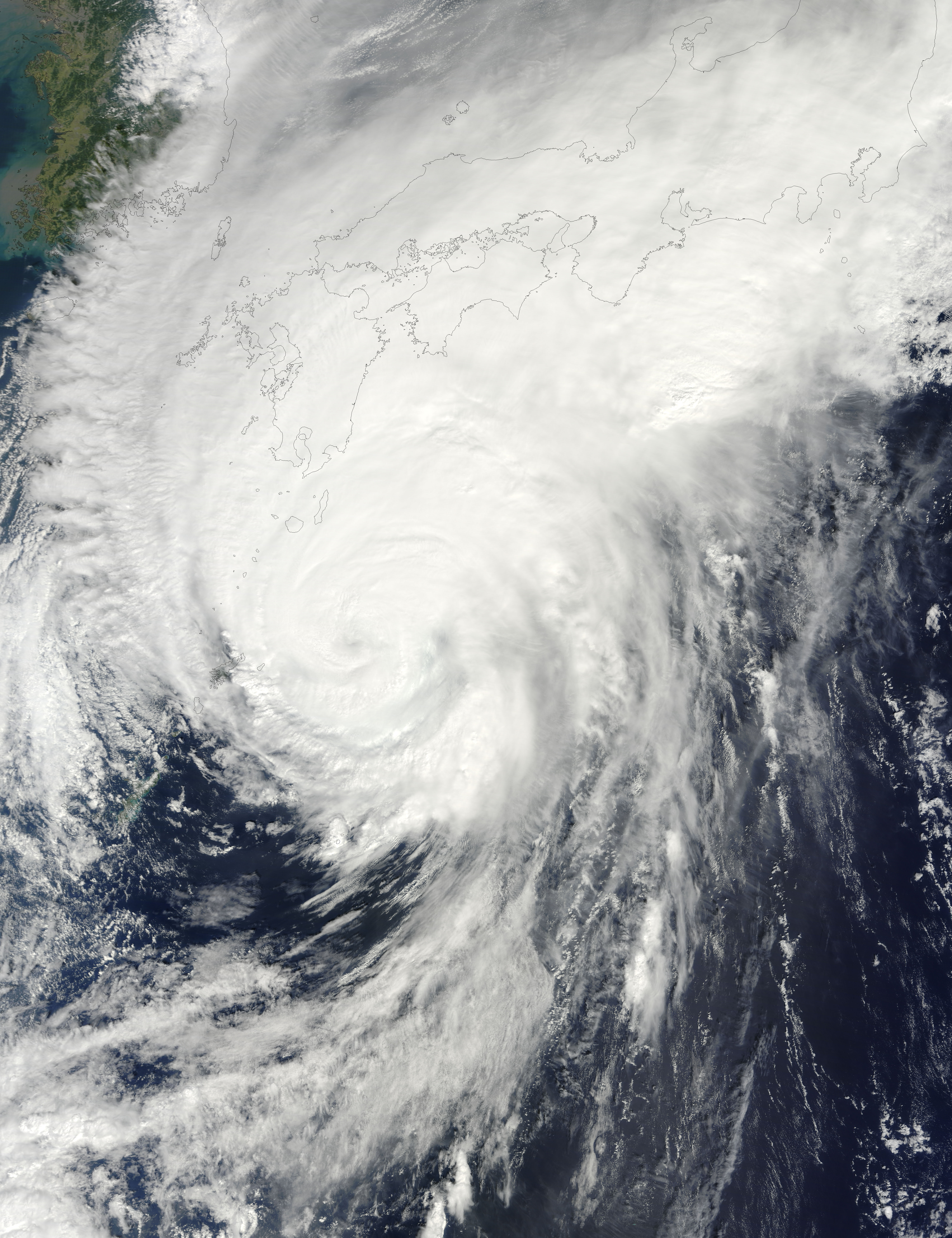
Typhoon Melor approaching Japan on October 7

As a weakened typhoon, Melor made landfall in Japan on October 7 with wind gusts over 155 km/h (100 mph), causing massive power outages. At the height of the storm, an estimated 500,000 residences, mainly around Tokyo, were without power. Trains were canceled during the storm as they were unable to travel in conditions produced by the storm. More than 2 million people, attempting to get to work, were stranded as transportation halted. According to the Fire and Disaster Management Agency, two people were killed during the storm and at least 100 other were injured throughout the country in various incidents. The first death occurred after a man on a motorcycle crashed into a downed tree and the other occurred after a man was struck by a broken tree limb. Roughly 400 homes were damaged or destroyed by Melor and monetary damages amounted to 130 billion yen ($1.5 billion USD).

Another 64 people were injured, according to local media reports, after Melor reached landfall in Japan's Aichi prefecture early Thursday morning.

Typhoon Melor landed south-west of Tokyo on the main island of Honshū on Thursday, October 8, causing at least two deaths and cutting electricity to thousands. Flights were also canceled and people evacuated amid flood and landslide warnings.

Still, initial damage reports suggested the typhoon, while powerful, did not cause the type of widespread devastation initially warned. Meteorologists had been warning that the storm could be the most powerful to hit Japan in more than a decade. Melor was the first typhoon to reach landfall in Japan in two years.

The storm was expected to drift off the country's eastern coast into the Pacific Ocean by Thursday evening. An official at Japan's meteorological agency said the storm weakened as it moved along the eastern coast, preventing heavier damage.

The typhoon brought wind speeds of about 160 kilometers per hour while dumping 30 centimeters of rain in some regions, according to Japan Meteorological Agency.

One 54-year-old man was killed while delivering newspapers when his bike hit a fallen tree in the early morning, while a 69-year-old man died in Saitama prefecture near Tokyo after a tree fell on him, according to local police officials.

Many factories in the manufacturing-rich prefectures in central Japan were also shut from the storm.

=== California ===
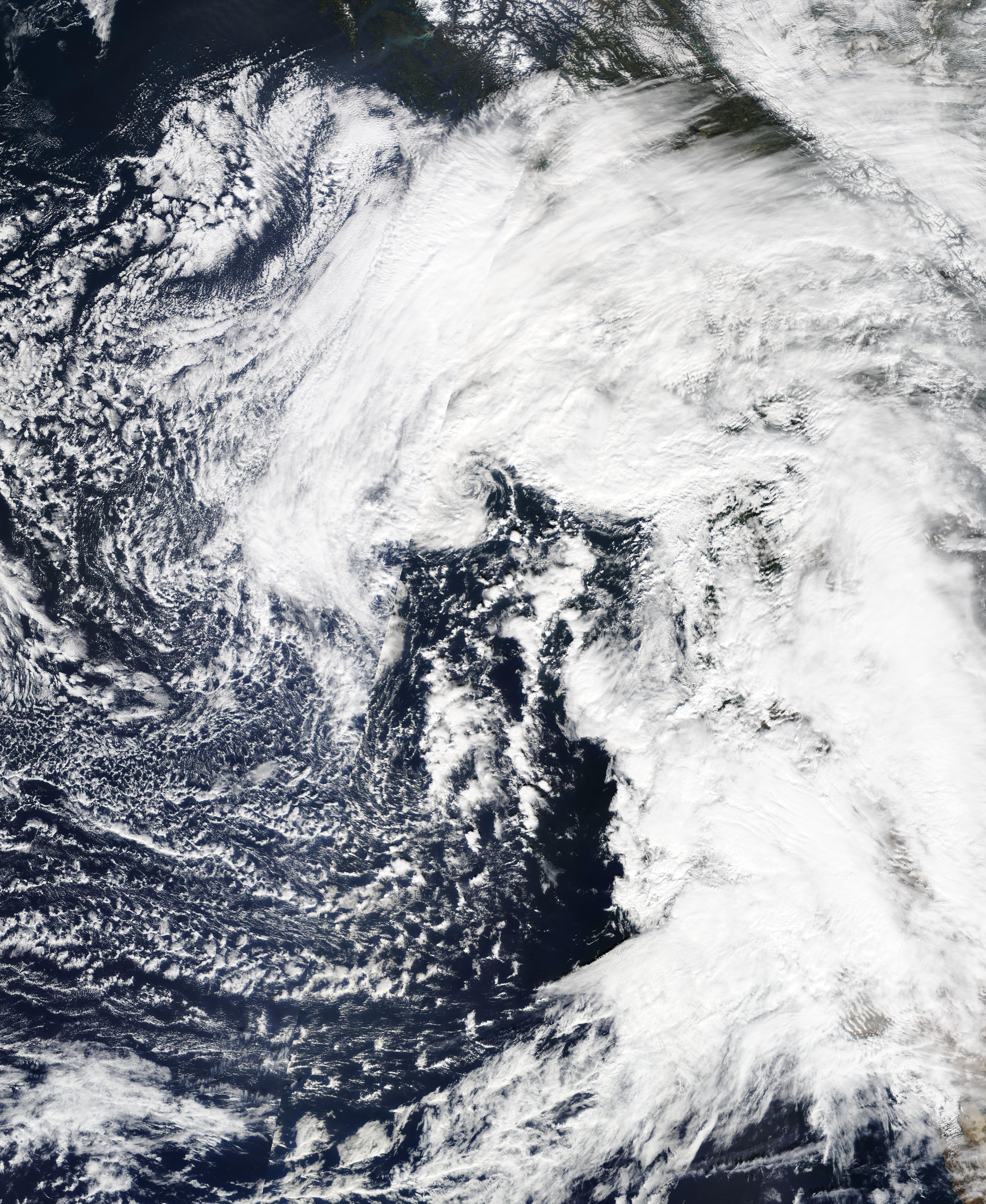
The extratropical cyclone (pictured) that went on to impact California after absorbing Melor's remnants.

On October 14, 2009, the extratropical cyclone that had absorbed Melor's remnants impacted California, and broke several rainfall records. Local California media had reported that the remnant of Typhoon Melor was able to kick up winds to as high as 70 mph (110 km/h). Some trees and power lines were downed as a result of this storm. Melor's remnants produced up to 10 inches (25 cm) of rain in California's Santa Cruz Mountains.

== See also ==
- Weather of 2009
- Tropical cyclones in 2009
- Typhoon Meari (2004)
- Typhoon Ma-on (2004)
- Typhoon Wipha (2013)
- Typhoon Vongfong (2014)
- Typhoon Choi-wan (2009)
