= Ise-Okitsu Station =

Railway station in Tsu, Mie Prefecture, Japan

Ise-Okitsu Station 伊勢奥津駅
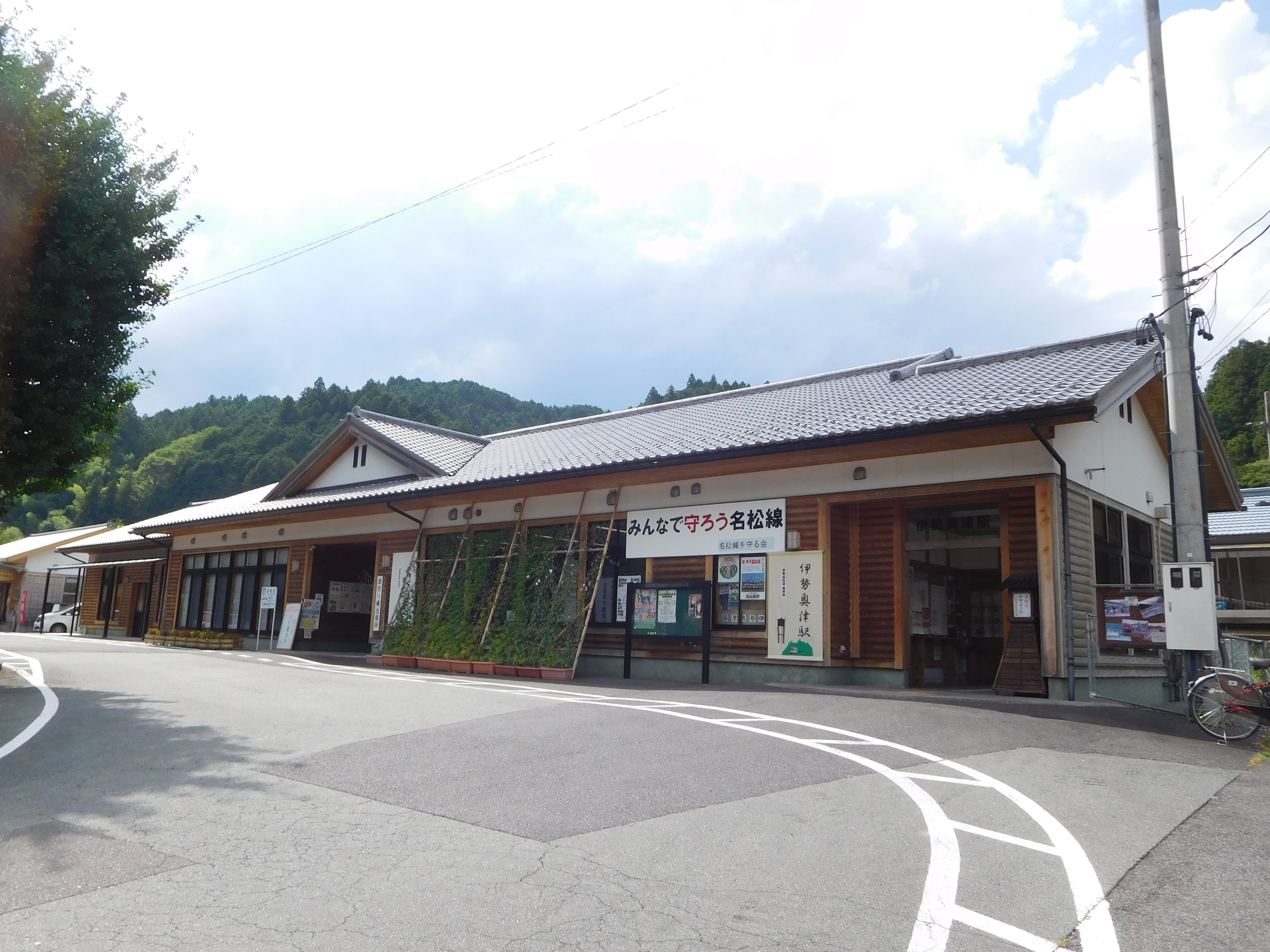
- Ise-Okitsu Station, August 2018

General information
- Location: Misugi-cho Okitsu 1288-8, Tsu-shi, Mie-ken 515-3531; Japan
- Coordinates: 34.5125°N 136.2593°E
- Operator: JR Tōkai
- Line: ■ Meishō Line
- Distance: 43.5 km from Matsusaka
- Platforms: 1 side platform
- Connections: Bus terminal

History
- Opened: December 5, 1935

Passengers
- FY2019: 26 daily
Location
- Location within Mie Prefecture Location within Japan

Ise-Okitsu Station (伊勢奥津駅, Ise-Okitsu-eki) is a passenger railway station in located in the city of Tsu, Mie Prefecture, Japan, operated by Central Japan Railway Company (JR Tōkai).

== Lines ==
Ise-Okitsu Station is served by the Meishō Line, and is 43.5 rail kilometers from the terminus of the line at Matsusaka Station.

== Station layout ==
The station consists of a single side platform serving one bi-directional track.

== Adjacent stations ==
«	Service	»
Meishō Line
Hitsu	Local	Terminus

== History ==
Ise-Okitsu Station was opened on December 5, 1935, as a station on the Japanese Government Railways (JGR) (which became the Japan National Railways (JNR) after World War II). Freight services were suspended from October 1965. The station has been unattended since April 1, 1986. Along with the division and privatization of JNR on April 1, 1987, the station came under the control and operation of the Central Japan Railway Company. The station has been unattended since 1990. The station building was rebuilt in 2005.

Between October 8, 2009, and March 26, 2016, the section between this station and Ieki Station was closed due to damage from Typhoon Melor. During this time, a bus line served this section of the line.

== Passenger statistics ==
In fiscal 2019, the station was used by an average of 26 passengers daily (boarding passengers only).

== Surrounding area ==
- Tsu City Yawata Branch Office / Yawata Community Resident Center (within station building)
- Tsu City Ise-Okitsu Station Tourist Information Exchange Facility (Adjacent to station building)
- Hachiman Shrine (Shrine related to Kitabatake Akiyoshi, Registered tangible cultural property of Mie Prefecture)
- Kitabatake Shrine

== See also ==
- List of railway stations in Japan
