= Matsusaka Station =

Railway station in Matsusaka, Mie Prefecture, Japan

Matsusaka Station 松阪駅
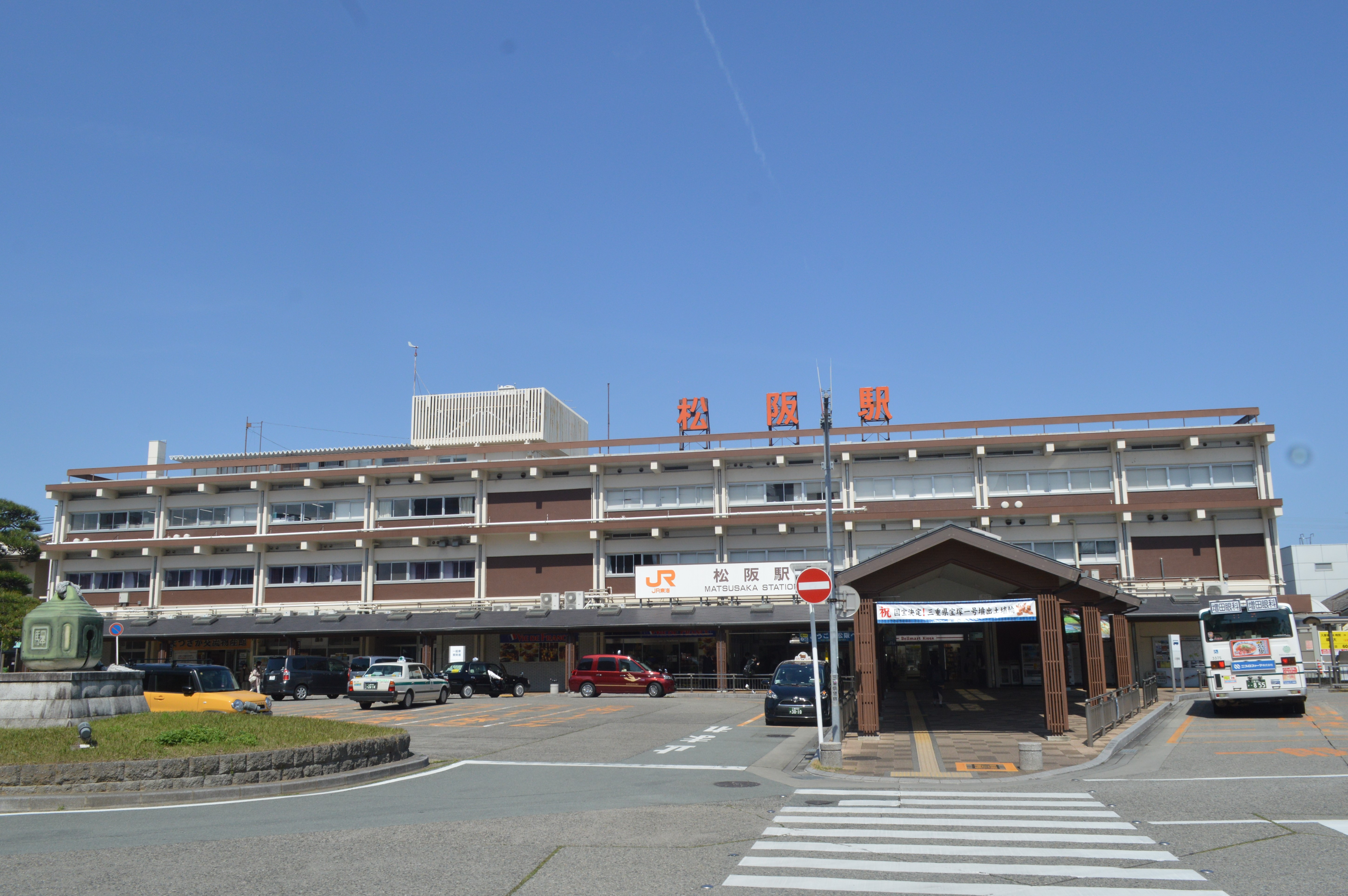
- Matsusaka Station, 2024

General information
- Location: Kyomachi, Matsusaka City, Mie Prefecture 515-0017; Japan
- Coordinates: 34.5768853°N 136.5355539°E
- Operator: JR Central; Kintetsu Railway
- Lines: Kisei Main Line; Meishō Line; M Yamada Line
- Platforms: 2 side + 3 island platforms

Other information
- Status: Staffed
- Station code: M64

History
- Opened: 31 December 1894; 131 years ago

Passengers
- FY2019: 1,702 (JR); 7,533 (Kintetsu) daily
Location
- Location within Mie Prefecture Location within Kansai region Location within Japan

Matsusaka Station (松阪駅, Matsusaka-eki) is a union passenger railway station in the city of Matsusaka, Mie Prefecture, operated jointly by Central Japan Railway Company (JR Central) and Kintetsu.

== Lines ==
Matsusaka Station is served by the JR Kisei Main Line and is 34.6 rail kilometers from the terminus of the line at Kameyama Station. It is also a terminus for the 43.5 kilometer JR Meishō Line to Ise-Okitsu Station. The station is also served by the Kintetsu Yamada Line and 8.4 rail kilometers from the terminus of that line at Ise-Nakagawa Station.

== Station layout ==
Matsusaka Station has a total of five platforms serving seven tracks. Of these, the JR portion of the station uses one side platform and two island platforms and the Kintetsu portion has one side platform and one island platform. The platforms are connected footbridges.

=== Platforms ===
1	■ Kisei Main Line	local trains for Kameyama via Tsu rapid "Mie" for Tsu, Yokkaichi, Kuwana and Nagoya a local train departing for Shingu at 5:22 a.m.
2	■ not used	the same track as Number 1
3	■ Kisei Main Line	local trains for Kameyama via Tsu limited express "Nanki" for Tsu, Yokkaichi, Kuwana and Nagoya
4	■ Kisei Main Line	local trains for Taki, Shingu, Iseshi and Toba rapid "Mie" for Taki, Iseshi and Toba limited express "Nanki" for Owase, Shingu and Kii-Katsuura
5	■ Meisho Line	local trains for Ieki and Ise-Okitsu
5	■ Kisei Main Line	local trains for Iseshi (partly) a local train departing for Kameyama at 9:03 a.m.
6	■ Yamada Line	for Ise-Nakagawa, Tsu, Nagoya, Osaka, Kobe and Kyoto
7	■ Yamada Line	for Ujiyamada, Toba and Kashikojima for Ise-Nakagawa and Nagoya
8	■ Yamada Line	for Ujiyamada, Toba and Kashikojima

== Adjacent stations ==
«	Service	»
Kisei Main Line
Tsu	Limited Express Nanki	Taki
Tsu	Rapid Mie	Taki
Rokken	Local	Tokuwa
Meishō Line
Terminus	Local	Kaminoshō
Yamada Line
Ise-Nakagawa	Limited Express	Iseshi
Ise-Nakagawa	Rapid Express	Iseshi
Ise-Nakagawa	Express	Miyamachi; Iseshi
Matsugasaki	Local	Higashi-Matsusaka

== History ==
Matsusaka Station opened on December 31, 1894 as a station on Sangu Railway Line. The line was nationalized on October 1, 1907, becoming the Sangu Line of the Japanese Government Railways (JGR) on October 12, 1909. On August 17, 1912, the Mie Electric Railway began operations at Matsusaka Station. The Meishō Line began operations from August 25, 1929. On March 27, 1930, Sangu Kyuko Electric Railway Co. connected to Matsusaka Station. A new station building was completed on December 3, 1937. Sangu Kyuko was acquired by Osaka Electric Railway Co. in March 1941, and renamed Kansai Kyuko Railway Co., subsequently merging with the Nankai Railway to form Kintetsu in 1944. The station was transferred to the control of the Japan National Railways (JNR) Kisei Main Line on July 15, 1959. A new station building was completed in November 1962. Mie Electric Railway went out of business in 1964. All freight operations were discontinued in 1984. The station was absorbed into the JR Central network upon the privatization of the JNR on April 1, 1987.

== Passenger statistics ==
In fiscal 2019, the JR portion of the station was used by an average of 1,702 passengers daily (boarding passengers only) and the Kintetsu portion of the station was used by an average of 7,533 passengers daily (boarding passengers only).

== Surrounding area ==
- Matsusaka City Hall
- Matsusaka Park (former site of Matsusaka Castle)
- Matsusaka Technical High School

== See also ==
- List of railway stations in Japan
