= Ikenoura Seaside Station =

Railway station in Ise, Mie Prefecture, Japan

Coordinates: 34°29′28.94″N 136°48′48.16″E

Ikenoura Seaside Station 池の浦シーサイド駅
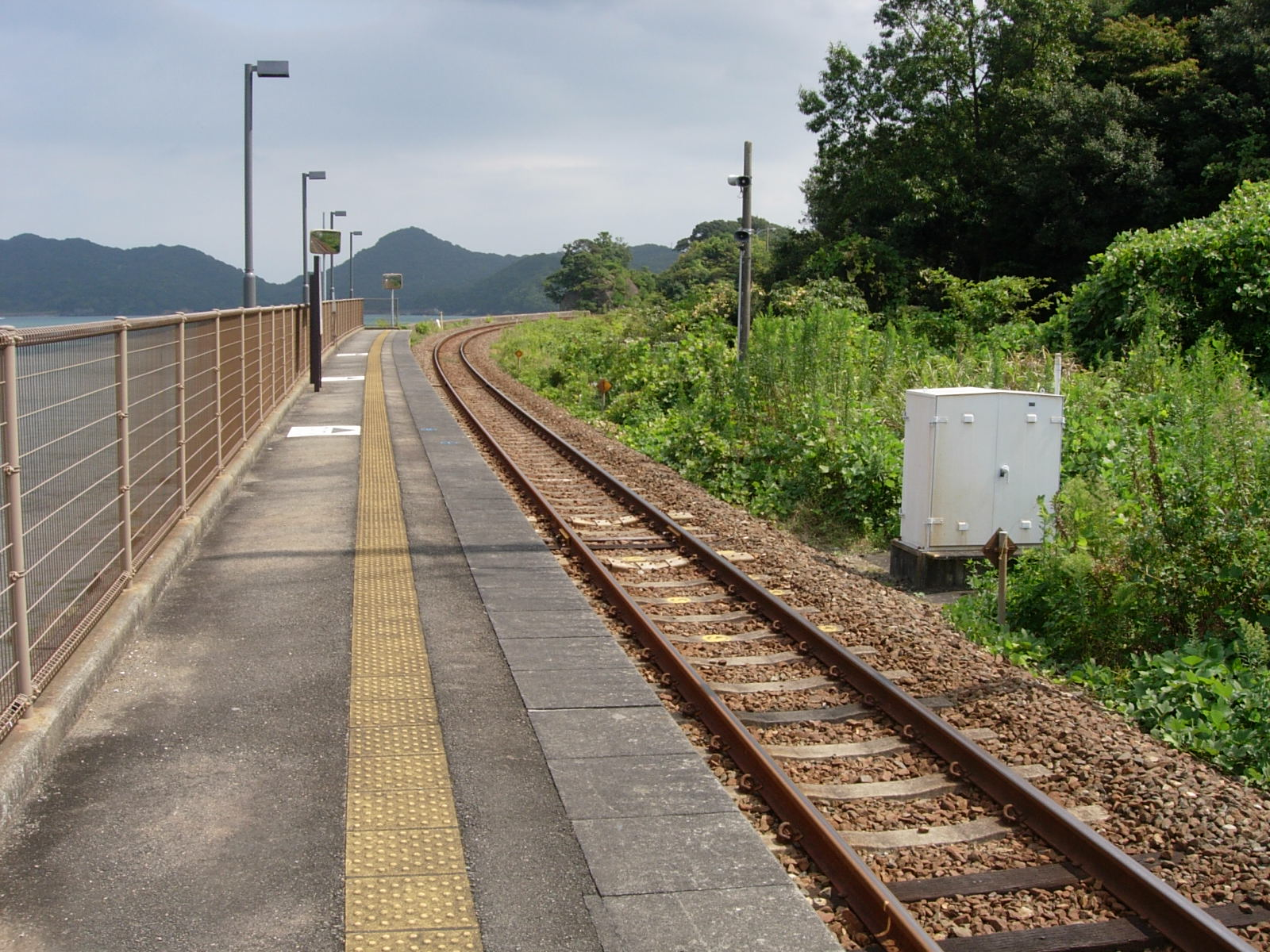
- Ikenoura Seaside Station

General information
- Location: 1769-18, Futami-cho Matsushita, Ise, Mie 519-0601 （三重県伊勢市二見町松下1769-18） Japan
- Operator: JR Central
- Line: Sangū Line
- Distance: 25.6 km (15.9 mi) from Taki
- Platforms: 1
- Connections: None

History
- Opened: 16 July 1989
- Closed: 14 March 2020
Location

Ikenoura Seaside Station (池の浦シーサイド駅, Ikenoura Shisaido-eki) was a railway station in Ise, Mie Prefecture, Japan, operated by Central Japan Railway Company (JR Central). The station was 25.4 rail kilometers from the terminus of the Sangū Line at Taki Station. It was a seasonal station that was only open during parts of the summer. At other times, no trains, not even locals, stopped at this station. On 14 March 2020, JR Central permanently closed the station, owing to low ridership over several years.

== History ==
Ikenoura Seaside Station opened on July 16, 1989.

The station was permanently closed on 14 March 2020.

== Lines ==
- JR Central
  - Sangū Line

== Station layout ==
Ikenoura Seaside Station consisted of one side platform serving bi-directional traffic. There was no station building, and the station was unattended.

=== Platforms ===
1	■ Sangū Line	For Taki; For Toba

== Adjacent stations ==
«	Service	»
JR Sangū Line
Matsushita	Local	Toba
Matsushita	Rapid Mie	Toba

== Surrounding area ==
- Ikenoura beach
