= Tokuwa Station =

Railway station in Matsusaka, Mie Prefecture, Japan

Tokuwa Station 徳和駅
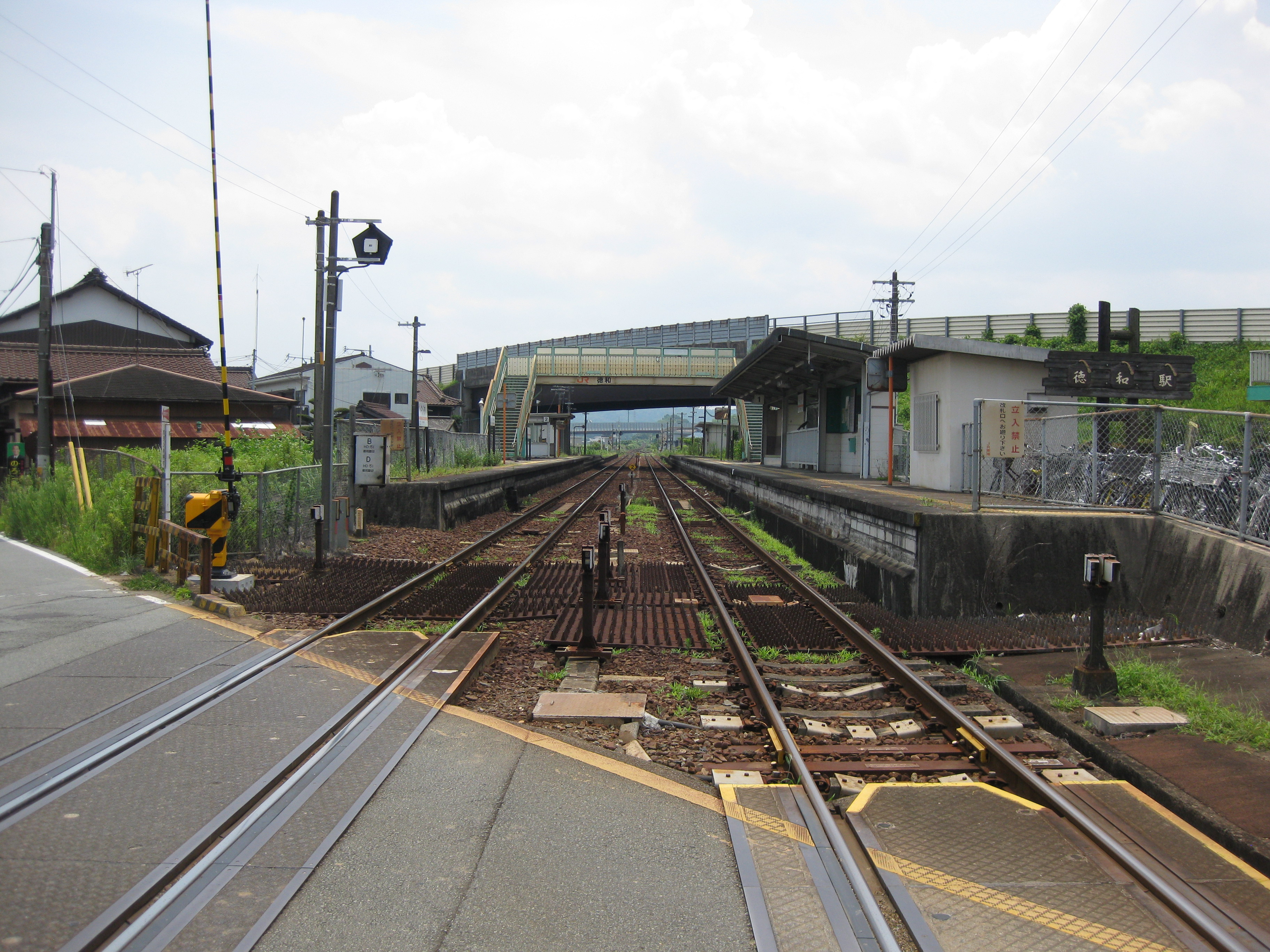
- Tokuwa Station in July 2017

General information
- Location: Shimomura 1855, Matsusaka-shi, Mie-ken 515-0043; Japan
- Coordinates: 34.5539°N 136.5534°E
- Operator: JR Tōkai
- Line: ■ Kisei Main Line
- Distance: 37.6 km from Kameyama
- Platforms: 2 side platforms
- Tracks: 2
- Connections: Bus terminal

Construction
- Structure type: Ground level

History
- Opened: 31 December 1894; 131 years ago

Passengers
- FY2019: 412 daily

Services
Preceding station	JR Central	Following station
Taki towards Shingū	Kisei Main Line Local	Matsusaka towards Nagoya
Location
- Location within Mie Prefecture Location within Japan

Tokuwa Station (徳和駅, Tokuwa-eki) is a passenger railway station in located in the city of Matsusaka, Mie Prefecture, Japan, operated by Central Japan Railway Company (JR Tōkai).

== Lines ==
Tokuwa Station is served by the Kisei Main Line, and is 37.6 km (23.4 mi) from the terminus of the line at Kameyama Station.

== Station layout ==
The station consists of two opposed side platforms connected by a footbridge.

=== Platforms ===
1	■ Kisei Main Line	For Kameyama, Yokkaichi, Kuwana and Nagoya
2	■ Kisei Main Line	For Iseshi, Toba, Shingū

== Adjacent stations ==
«	Service	»
Central Japan Railway Company
Kisei Main Line
Rapid "Mie": Does not stop at this station
Limited Express "Nanki": Does not stop at this station
Matsusaka	Local	Taki

== History ==
Tokuwa Station opened on 31 December 1894 as a station on the Sangu Railway Line. The line was nationalized on 1 October 1907, becoming the Sangu Line of the Japanese Government Railways (JGR) on 12 October 1909. On 25 December 1930, the Ise Electric Railway Line connected to Tokuwa Station. This line merged with the Sangu Express Electric Railway in 1936, which was acquired by the Osaka Electrical Railway in 1941, and renamed the Kansai Express Railway. However, this company went out of business in 1942. The station was transferred to the control of the Japanese National Railways (JNR) Kisei Main Line on 15 July 1959. The station has been unattended since 21 December 1983. With the privatization of the JNR on 1 April 1987, the station was absorbed into the JR Central network.

== Passenger statistics ==
In fiscal 2019, the station was used by an average of 412 passengers daily (boarding passengers only).

== Surrounding area ==
- Matsusaka City Hall Tokuwa District Civic Center
- Mie Prefectural Matsusaka Commercial High School

== See also ==
- List of railway stations in Japan
