= Yamada-Kamiguchi Station =

Railway station in Ise, Mie Prefecture, Japan

Yamada-Kamiguchi Station 山田上口駅
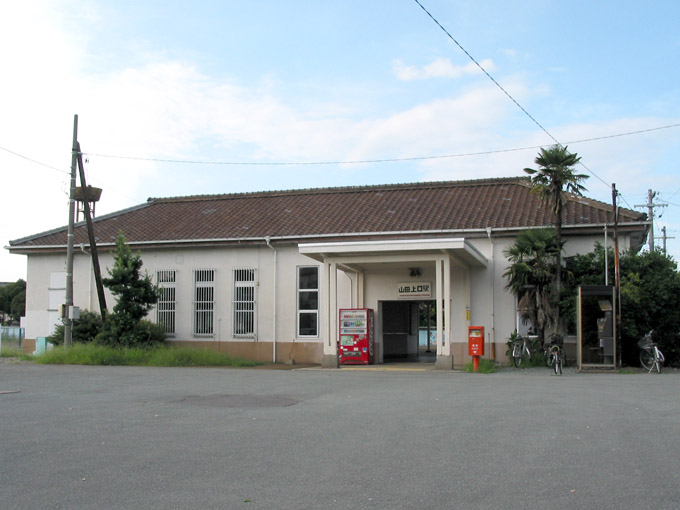
- Yamada-Kamiguchi Station

General information
- Location: 1-17-15 Tokiwa, Ise-shi, Mie-ken 516-0041; Japan
- Coordinates: 34.4953°N 136.6940°E
- Operator: JR Tōkai
- Line: ■ Sangū Line
- Distance: 13.2 km from Taki
- Platforms: 1 side platform
- Connections: Bus terminal

Other information
- Status: Staffed

History
- Opened: December 31, 1893; 132 years ago
- Former names: Tsujikaibashi (until 1917)

Passengers
- FY2019: 120 daily
Location
- Location within Mie Prefecture Location within Japan

Yamada-Kamiguchi Station (山田上口駅, Yamada-Kamiguchi-eki) is a passenger railway station in located in the city of Ise, Mie Prefecture, Japan, operated by Central Japan Railway Company (JR Tōkai).

== Lines ==
Yamada-Kamiguchi Station is served by the Sangū Line, and is located 13.2 rail kilometers from the terminus of the line at Taki Station.

== Station layout ==
The station consists of a single side platform serving one bi-directional track.

=== Platforms ===
1	■ Sangū Line	For Matsusaka, Kameyama, Yokkaichi and Nagoya for Iseshi and Toba

== Adjacent stations ==
«	Service	»
JR Central Sangū Line
Miyagawa	Local	Iseshi
Miyagawa	Rapid "Mie" 2 for Nagoya; Rapid "Mie" 19, 21, 23, 25 for Iseshi	Iseshi

== History ==
Yamada-Kamiguchi Station opened on December 31, 1893 as Tsujikaibashi Station (筋向橋駅, Tsujikaibashi-eki) on the privately owned Sangū Railway, The line was nationalized on October 1, 1907, becoming part of the Japanese Government Railway (JGR), which became the Japan National Railways (JNR) after World War II. The station was renamed to its present name after a complaint was lodged to the Railway Ministry by the mayor of Uji-yamada, stating that the name was difficult to read, and that the bridge in question was an insignificantly small landmark located over 300 meters from the station. The station has been unattended since December 21, 1983. The station was absorbed into the JR Central network upon the privatization of the JNR on April 1, 1987.

== Passenger statistics ==
In fiscal 2019, the station was used by an average of 120 passengers daily (boarding passengers only).

== Surrounding area ==
- Miya River • Miya Riverbank Park lined with cherry blossoms
- Yokohama Rubber Company Mie plant
- Ujiyamada High School
- Ise Library
- Kintetsu - Miyamachi Station

== See also ==
- List of railway stations in Japan
