= Isuzugaoka Station =

Railway station in Ise, Mie Prefecture, Japan

Isuzugaoka Station 五十鈴ヶ丘駅
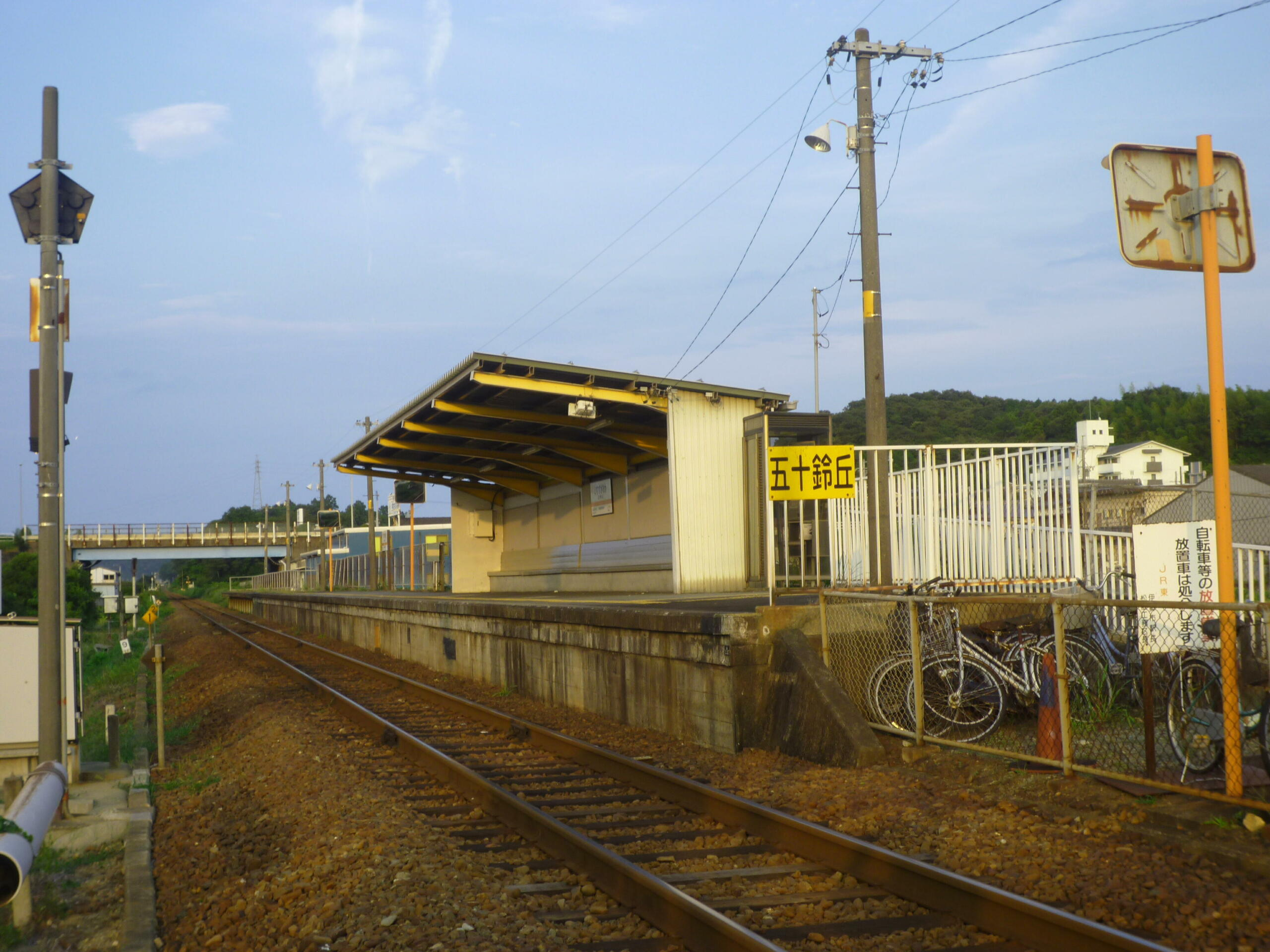
- Isuzugaoka Station

General information
- Location: 1342 Kurosei-cho, Ise-shi, Mie-ken 516-0018; Japan
- Coordinates: 34°29′44.92″N 136°44′22.21″E
- Operator: JR Tōkai
- Line: ■ Sangū Line
- Distance: 17.9 km from Taki
- Platforms: 1 side platform
- Connections: Bus terminal

History
- Opened: December 31, 1893; 132 years ago

Passengers
- FY2019: 252 daily
Location
- Location within Mie Prefecture Location within Japan

Isuzugaoka Station (五十鈴ヶ丘駅, Isuzugaoka-eki) is a passenger railway station in located in the city of Ise, Mie Prefecture, Japan, operated by Central Japan Railway Company (JR Tōkai).

== Lines ==
Isuzugaoka Station is served by the Sangū Line, and is located 17.9 rail kilometers from the terminus of the line at Taki Station.

== Station layout ==
The station consists of one side platform serving a single bi-directional traffic. There is no station building, and the station is unattended.

=== Platforms ===
1	■ Sangū Line	For Iseshi, Taki, Kameyama, Yokkaichi and Nagoya; For Futaminoura and Toba

== Adjacent stations ==
«	Service	»
JR Sangū Line
Iseshi	Local	Futaminoura
Iseshi	Rapid Mie	Futaminoura

== History ==
Isuzugaoka Station opened on April 1, 1963 as a station on the Japan National Railways (JNR) Sangū Line. The station was absorbed into the JR Central network upon the privatization of the JNR on April 1, 1987.

== Passenger statistics ==
In fiscal 2019, the station was used by an average of 252 passengers daily (boarding passengers only).

== Surrounding area ==
- Ujiyamada Commercial High School
- Ise Women's High School
- Kuratayama Park

== See also ==
- List of railway stations in Japan
