= Miyagawa Station =

Railway station in Ise, Mie Prefecture, Japan

Miyagawa Station 宮川駅
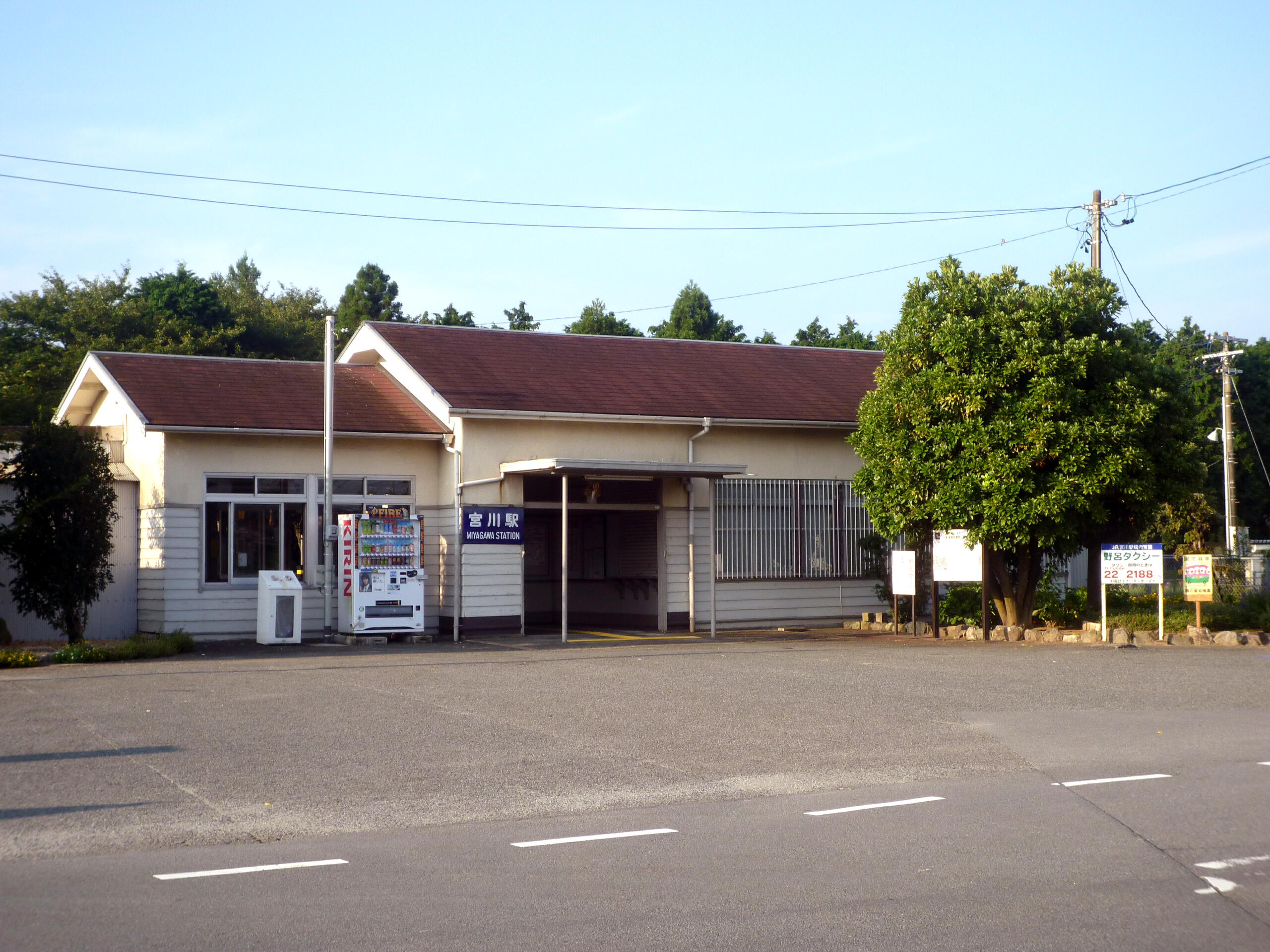
- Miyagawa Station

General information
- Location: 2931-1 Obata-cho Honmachi, Ise-shi, Mie-ken 519-0505; Japan
- Coordinates: 34.5033°N 136.6725°E
- Operator: JR Tōkai
- Line: ■ Sangū Line
- Distance: 11.0 km from Taki
- Platforms: 2 side platforms
- Connections: Bus terminal

Other information
- Status: Staffed

History
- Opened: December 31, 1893; 132 years ago

Passengers
- FY2019: 279 daily
Location
- Location within Mie Prefecture Location within Japan

Miyagawa Station (宮川駅, Miyagawa-eki) is a passenger railway station in located in the city of Ise, Mie Prefecture, Japan, operated by Central Japan Railway Company (JR Tōkai).

== Lines ==
Miyagawa Station is served by the Sangū Line, and is located 11.0 rail kilometers from the terminus of the line at Taki Station.

== Station layout ==
The station consists of two opposed side platforms connected by a level crossing.

=== Platforms ===
1	■ Sangū Line	For Iseshi and Toba
2	■ Sangū Line	for Matsusaka, Kameyama, Yokkaichi and Nagoya

== Adjacent stations ==
«	Service	»
Sangū Line
Tamaru	Local	Yamada-Kamiguchi
Tamaru	Rapid "Mie" 4 for Nagoya	Iseshi
Tamaru	Rapid "Mie" 2 for Nagoya; Rapid "Mie" 19, 21, 23, 25 for Iseshi	Yamada-Kamiguchi

== History ==
Miyagawa Station opened on December 31, 1893, as a station on the privately owned Sangū Railway. The line was nationalized on October 1, 1907, becoming part of the Japanese Government Railway (JGR), which became the Japan National Railways (JNR) after World War II. The current station building was completed in 1912. The station was absorbed into the JR Central network upon the privatization of the JNR on April 1, 1987. The station has been unattended since October 1, 2012.

== Passenger statistics ==
In fiscal 2019, the station was used by an average of 279 passengers daily (boarding passengers only).

== Surrounding area ==
- site of Rikyū-in palace
- Ise City Obata Junior High School

Ise City Obata Elementary School

== See also ==
- List of railway stations in Japan
