= Tokida Station =

Railway station in Taki, Mie Prefecture, Japan

Tokida Station 外城田駅
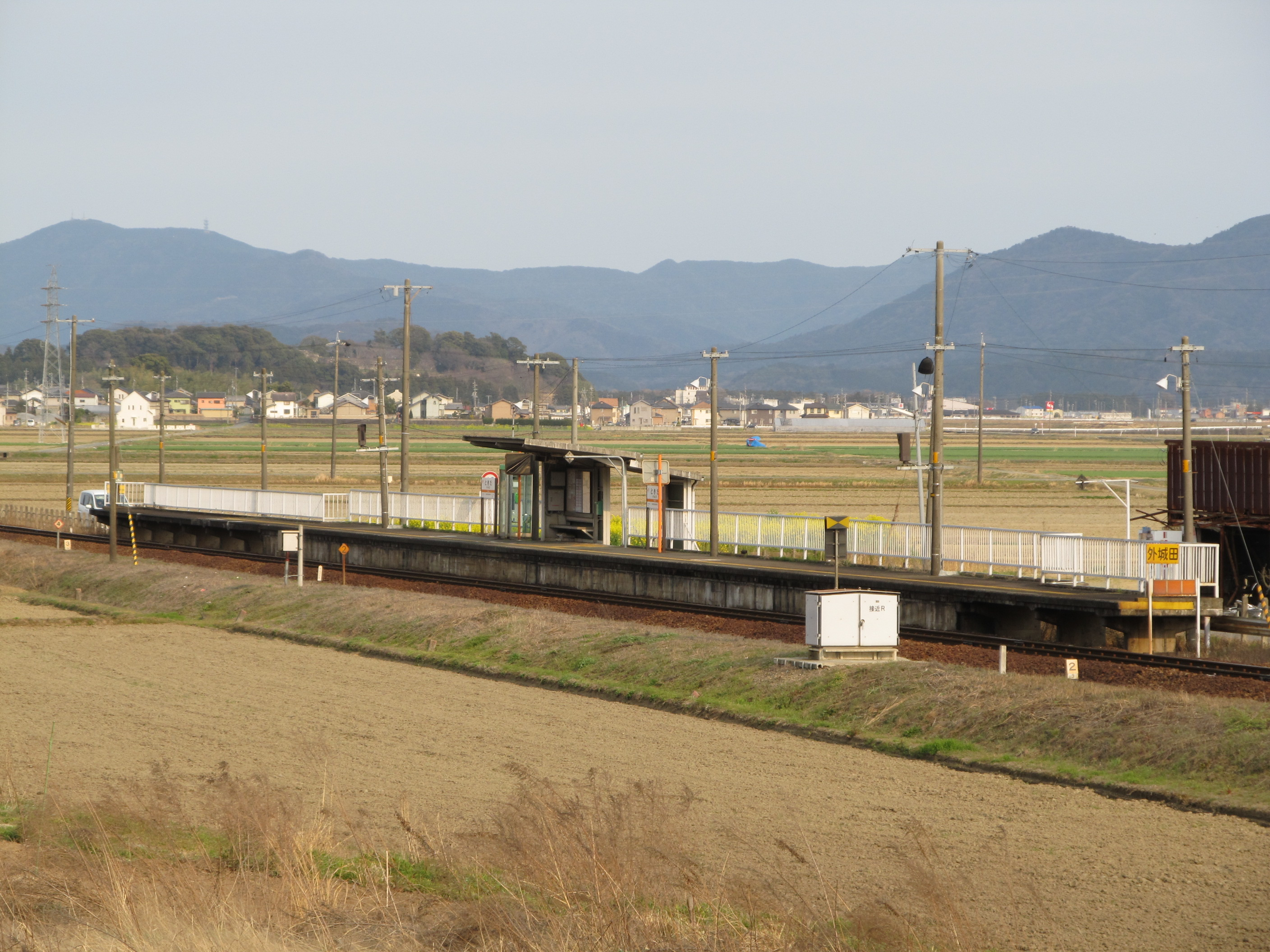
- Tokida Station

General information
- Location: 2235 Toba, Taki-cho, Taki-gun, Mie-ken 519-2161; Japan
- Coordinates: 34.4974°N 136.5971°E
- Operator: JR Tōkai
- Line: ■ Sangū Line
- Distance: 3.3 km from Taki
- Platforms: 1 side platform
- Connections: Bus terminal

Other information
- Status: Unstaffed

History
- Opened: January 24, 1963; 63 years ago

Passengers
- FY2019: 109 daily
Location
- Location within Mie Prefecture Location within Japan

Tokida Station (外城田駅, Tokida-eki) is a passenger railway station located in the town of Taki, Taki District, Mie Prefecture, Japan, operated by Central Japan Railway Company (JR Tōkai).

== Lines ==
Tokida Station is served by the Kisei Main Line, and is located 3.3 rail kilometers from the terminus of the line at Taki Station.

== Station layout ==
The station consists of one side platform serving bi-directional traffic. There is no station building, and the station is unattended.

=== Platforms ===
1	■ Sangū Line	For Taki, Kameyama, Yokkaichi and Nagoya; For Iseshi and Toba

== Adjacent stations ==
«	Service	»
JR Sangū Line
Taki	Local	Tamaru
Taki	Rapid "Mie" 2 for Nagoya; Rapid "Mie" 19, 21, 23, 25 for Iseshi	Tamaru

== History ==
Tokida Station opened on January 24, 1963 as a station on the Japan National Railways (JNR) Sangū Line. The station was absorbed into the JR Central network upon the privatization of the JNR on April 1, 1987.

== Passenger statistics ==
In fiscal 2019, the station was used by an average of 109 passengers daily (boarding passengers only).

== Surrounding area ==
- Mifune Shrine / Muyano Shrine
- Kano Shrine / Kano Gozen Shrine
- Kuchira Shrine
- Sugihara Shrine

== See also ==
- List of railway stations in Japan
