= KiHa 25 =

Japanese diesel multiple unit train type

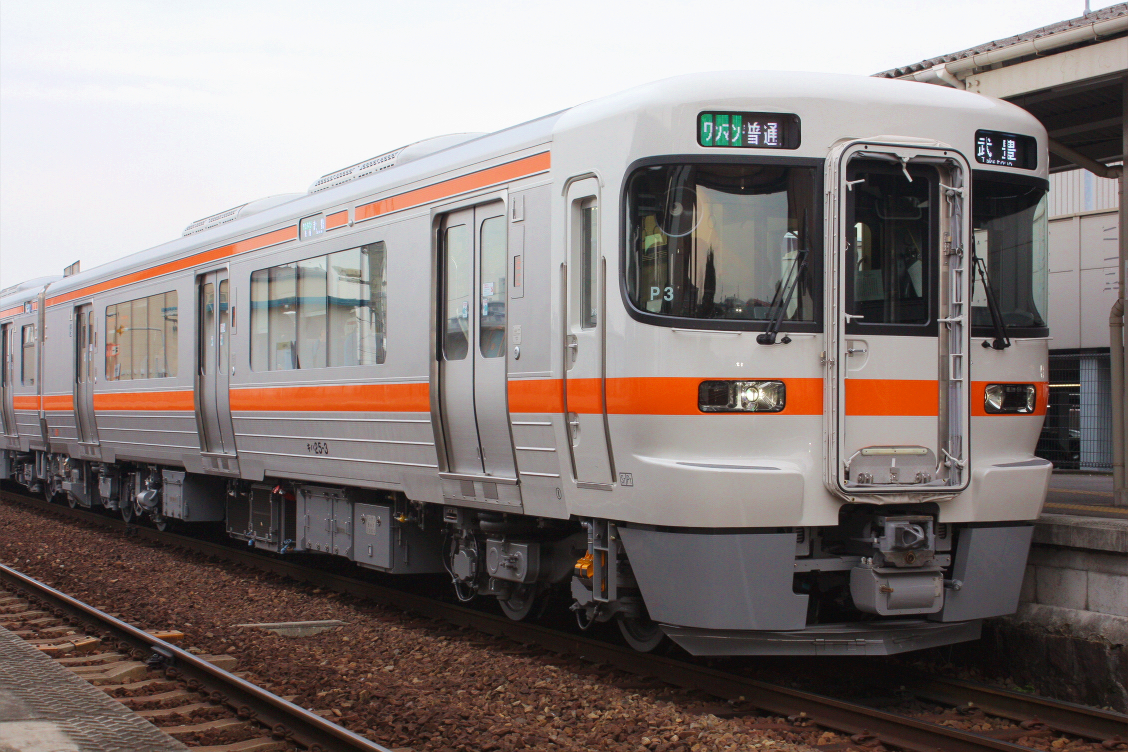
- First-batch set P3 on the Taketoyo Line in March 2011
- In service: March 2011 – present
- Manufacturer: Nippon Sharyo
- Built at: Toyokawa, Aichi
- Replaced: KiHa 40 series
- Constructed: 2010–2015
- Number built: 62 vehicles (31 sets)
- Number in service: 62 vehicles (31 sets)
- Formation: 2 cars per set
- Fleet numbers: P1–P5, P101–P108, M1–M4, M101–M114
- Operator: JR Central
- Depot: Nagoya
- Lines served: Takayama Main Line, Taita Line; Kisei Main Line; Sangū Line; Ise Line (rarely); Kansai Main Line (rarely), Taketoyo Line (previously)

Specifications
- Car body construction: Stainless steel
- Car length: 20,100 mm (65 ft 11 in)
- Width: 2,978 mm (9 ft 9.2 in)
- Height: 4,020 mm (13 ft 2 in)
- Floor height: 1,140 mm (3 ft 9 in)
- Doors: Three pairs per side
- Maximum speed: 110 km/h (68 mph)
- Prime mover: C-DMF14HZD (1 per car)
- Power output: 450 hp (340 kW)
- Transmission: Hydraulic
- Bogies: C-DT67 (powered), C-T255 (trailer)
- Safety systems: ATS-PT, ATS-ST
- Track gauge: 1,067 mm (3 ft 6 in)

The KiHa 25 (キハ25形) is a diesel multiple unit (DMU) train type operated by the Central Japan Railway Company (JR Central) on local and rapid services in Japan, since March 2011. They are based on the 313 series. Following electrification of the Taketoyo Line in 2015, they replaced KiHa 40 series DMUs on the Takayama and Taita Lines.

The "KiHa" designation derives from the classification system used by JNR. "Ki" indicates a diesel-powered vehicle, while "Ha" indicates an ordinary passenger car, as opposed to a green car.

== Variants ==
- KiHa 25: 1st-batch 2-car sets in service since March 2011
- KiHa 25-1000: 2nd-batch cold-region 2-car sets in service since 1 December 2014
- KiHa 25-1500: Warm-region 2-car sets

== Operations ==
- Taketoyo Line (2011–2015)
- Takayama Main Line (since March 2015)
- Taita Line
- Kisei Main Line (since 1 August 2015)
- Sangū Line (since 1 August 2015)

During special events like the Formula One Grand Prix held at Suzuka Circuit every October, the KiHa 25 units will also serve the Ise Line and Kansai Main Line.

== Formations ==
As of 1 April 2015, the fleet consists of 26 cars, formed as five two-car first-batch sets (P1 to P5), and eight two-car second-batch sets (P101 to P108).

=== KiHa 25-0 series ===
The 1st-batch sets are formed as follows.

Designation	Mc1	Mc2
Numbering	KiHa 25-100	KiHa 25
Weight (t)	40.0	39.3
Capacity (total/seated)	134/40	140/48

The KiHa 25-0 cars have a universal access toilet.

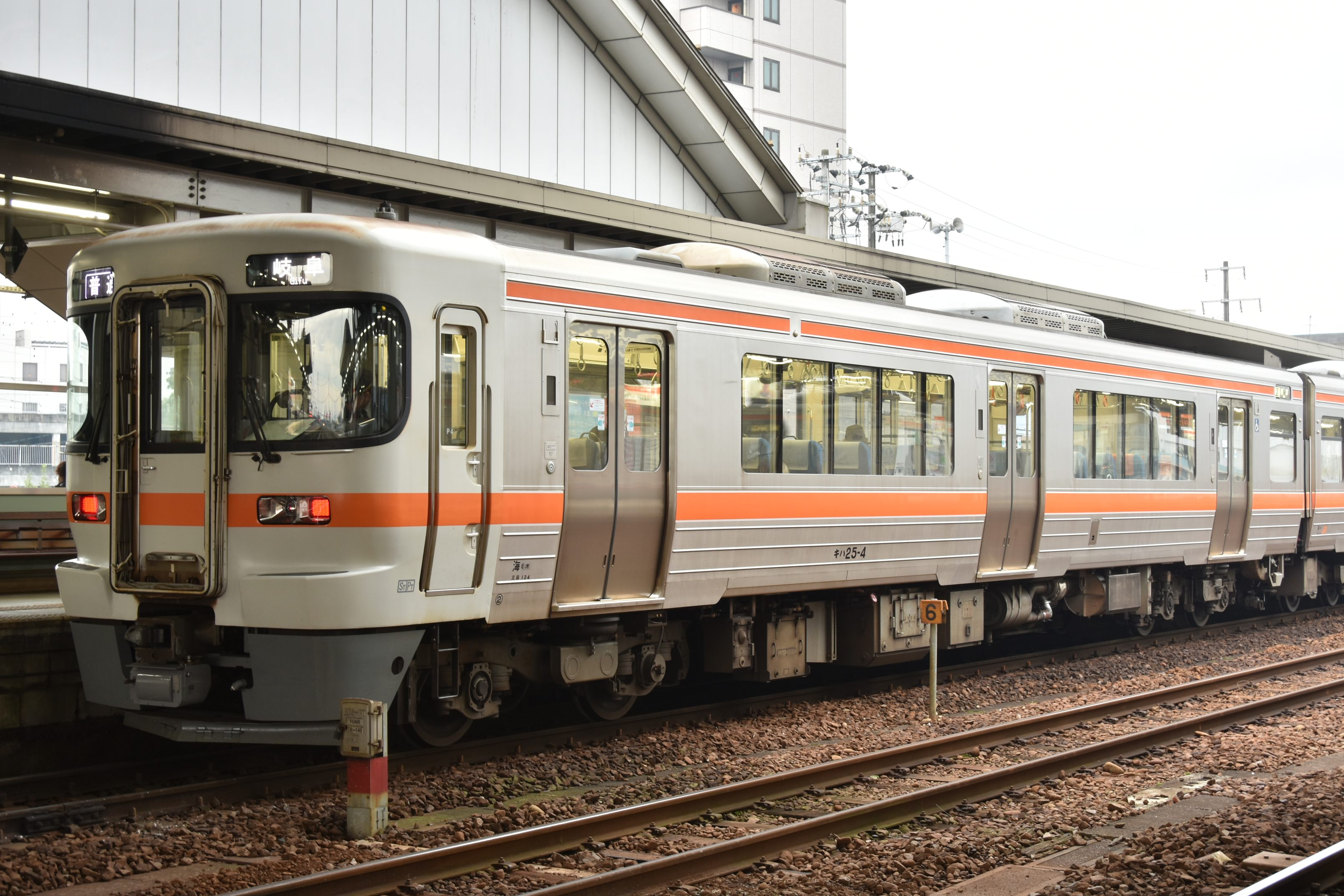
KiHa 25-4 of set P4 in December 2015

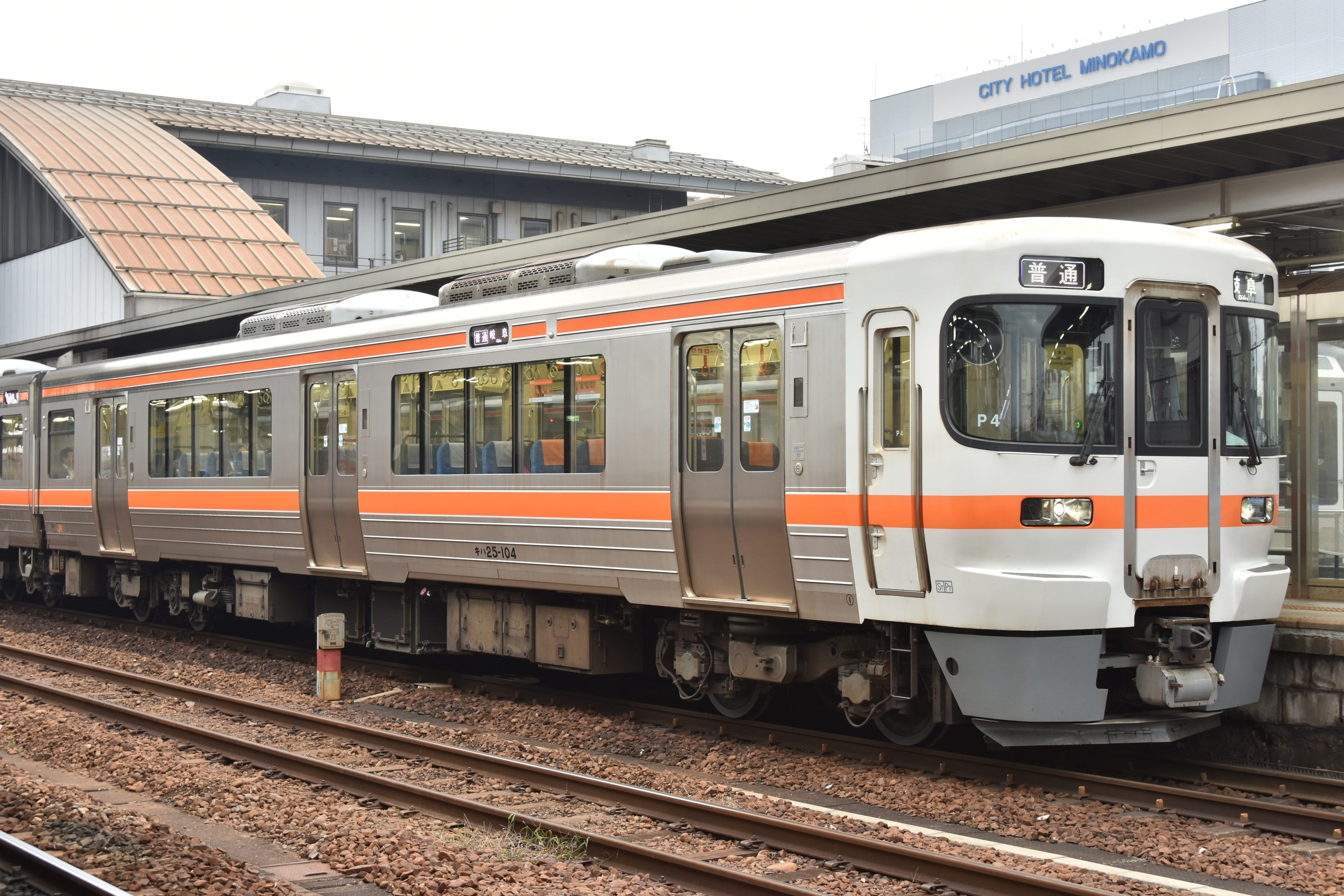
KiHa 25-104 of set P4 in December 2015

=== KiHa 25-1000 series ===
The KiHa 25-1000 series sets are formed as follows.

Designation	Mc1	Mc2
Numbering	KiHa 25-1100	KiHa 25-1000
Weight (t)	40.0	39.3
Capacity (total/seated)	134/40	140/48

The KiHa 25-1000 cars have a universal access toilet.

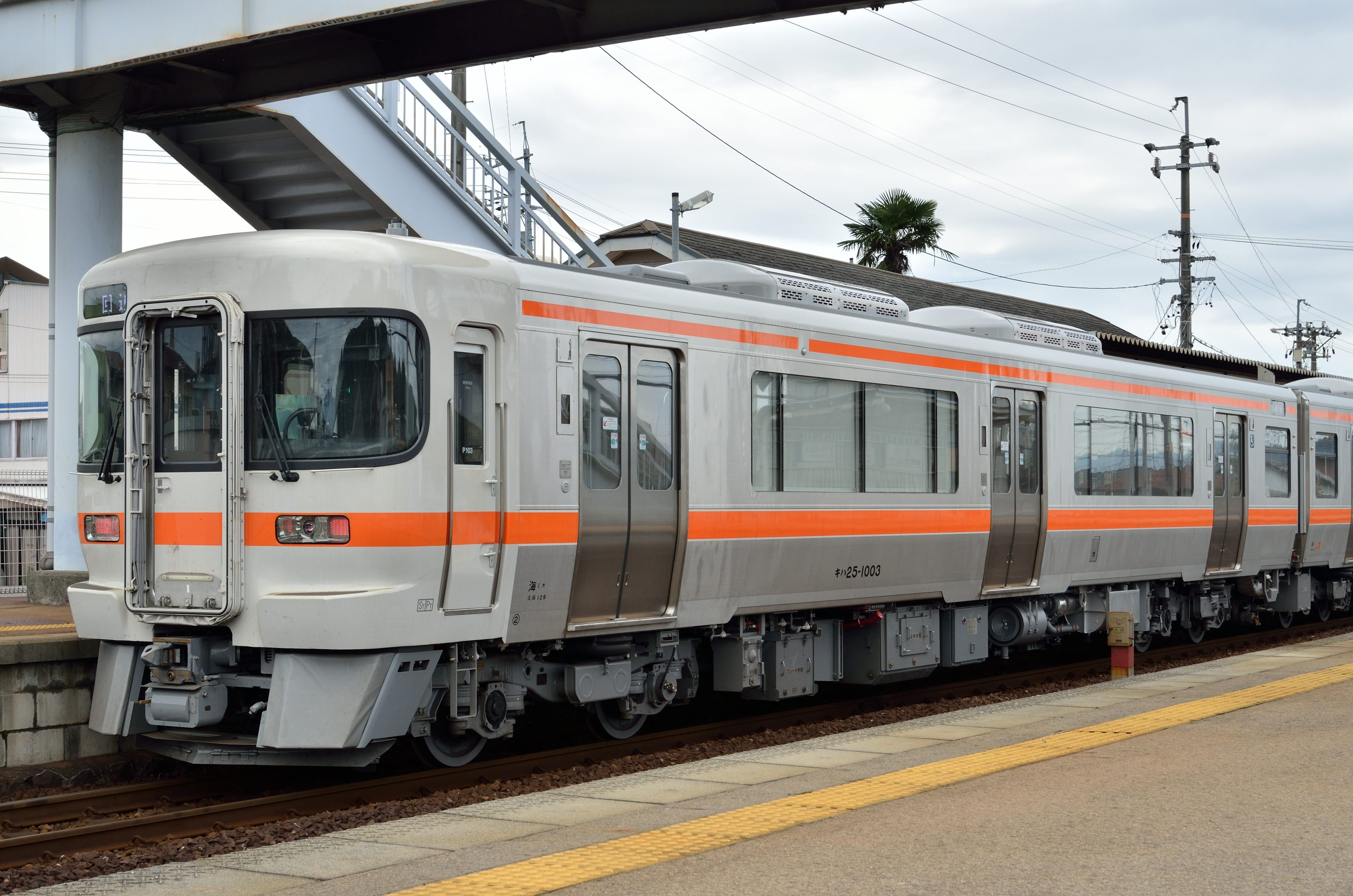
KiHa 25-1003 of set P103 in October 2014

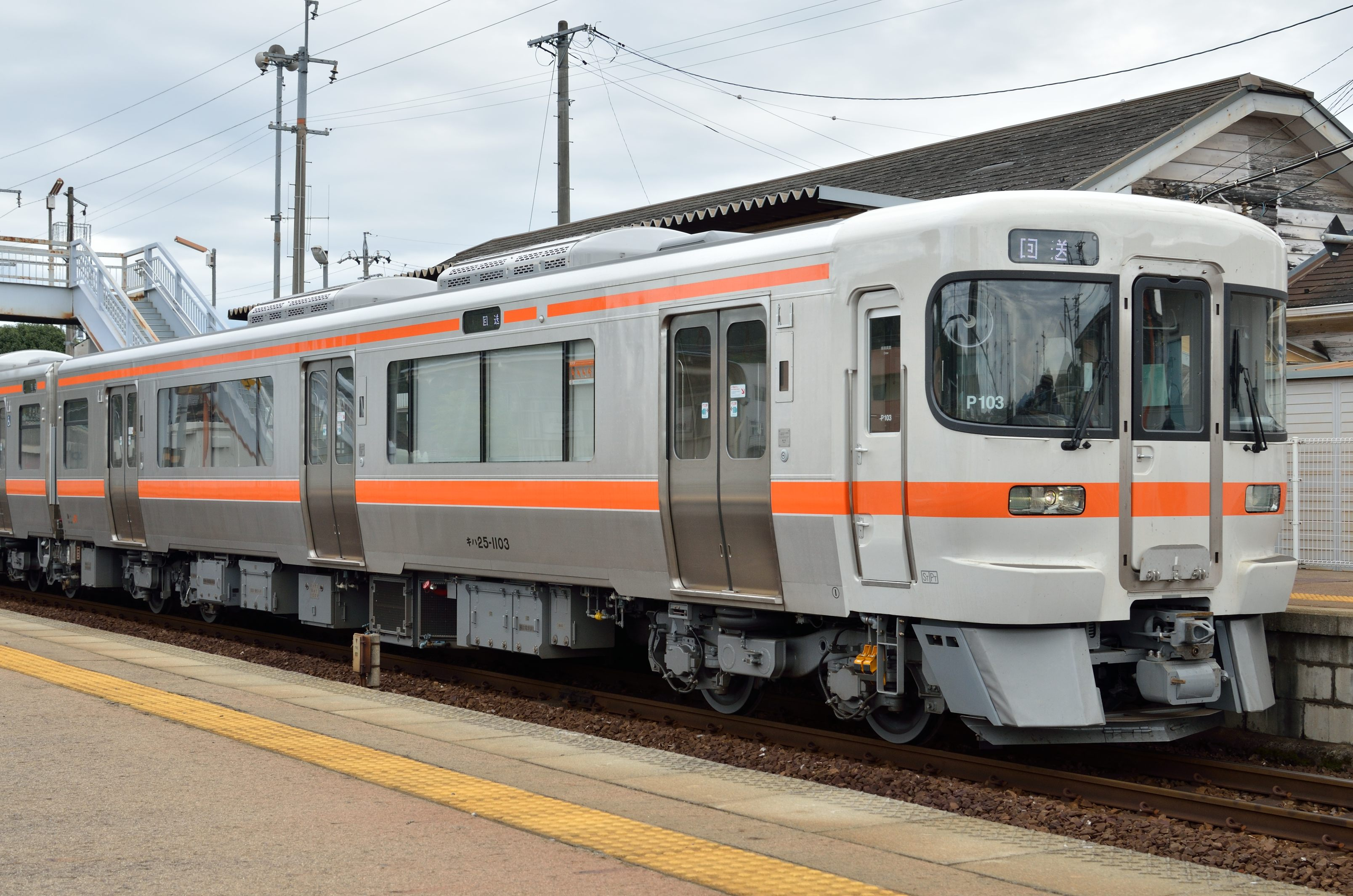
KiHa 25-1103 of set P103 in October 2014

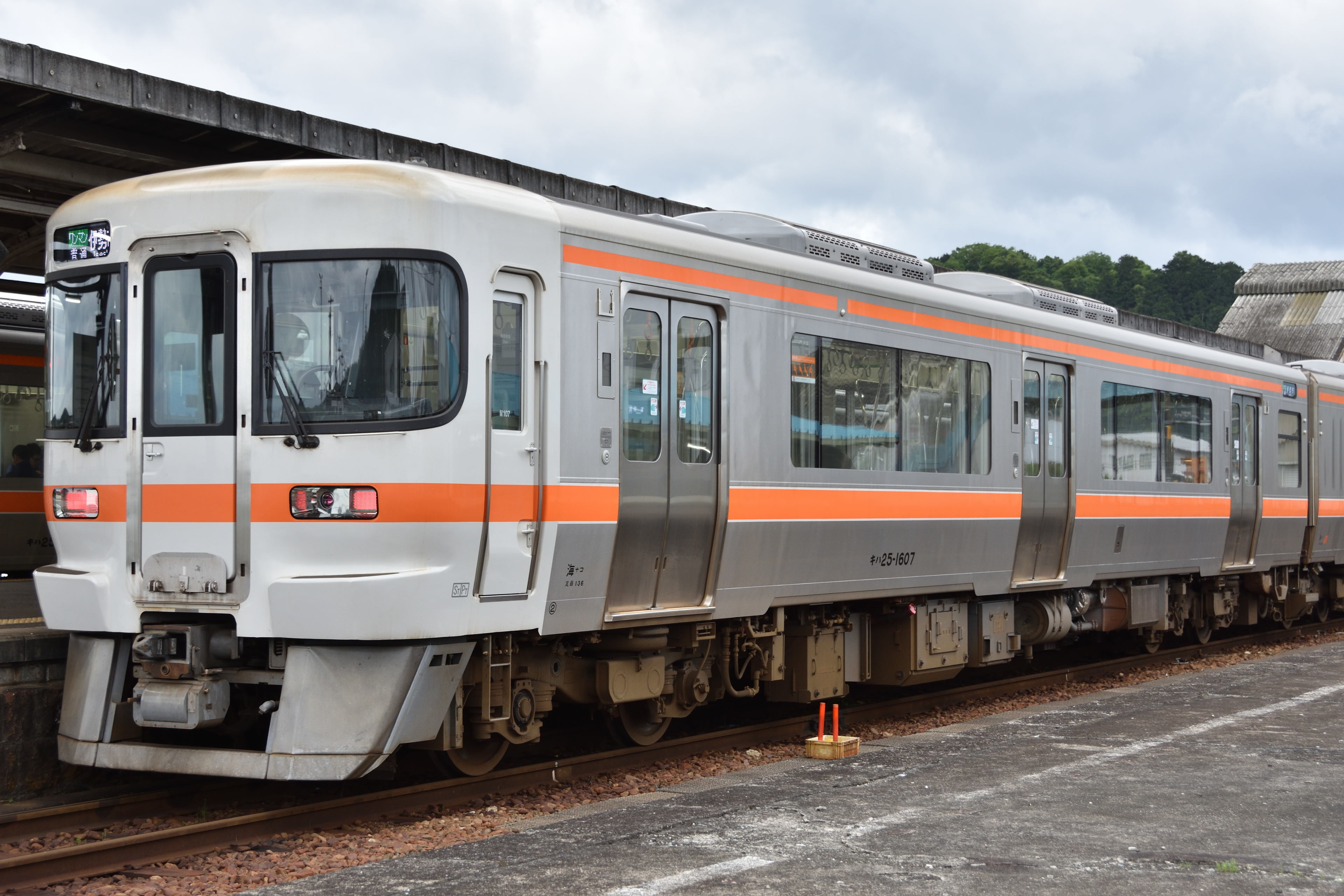
KiHa 25-1607 of set M107 in May 2016

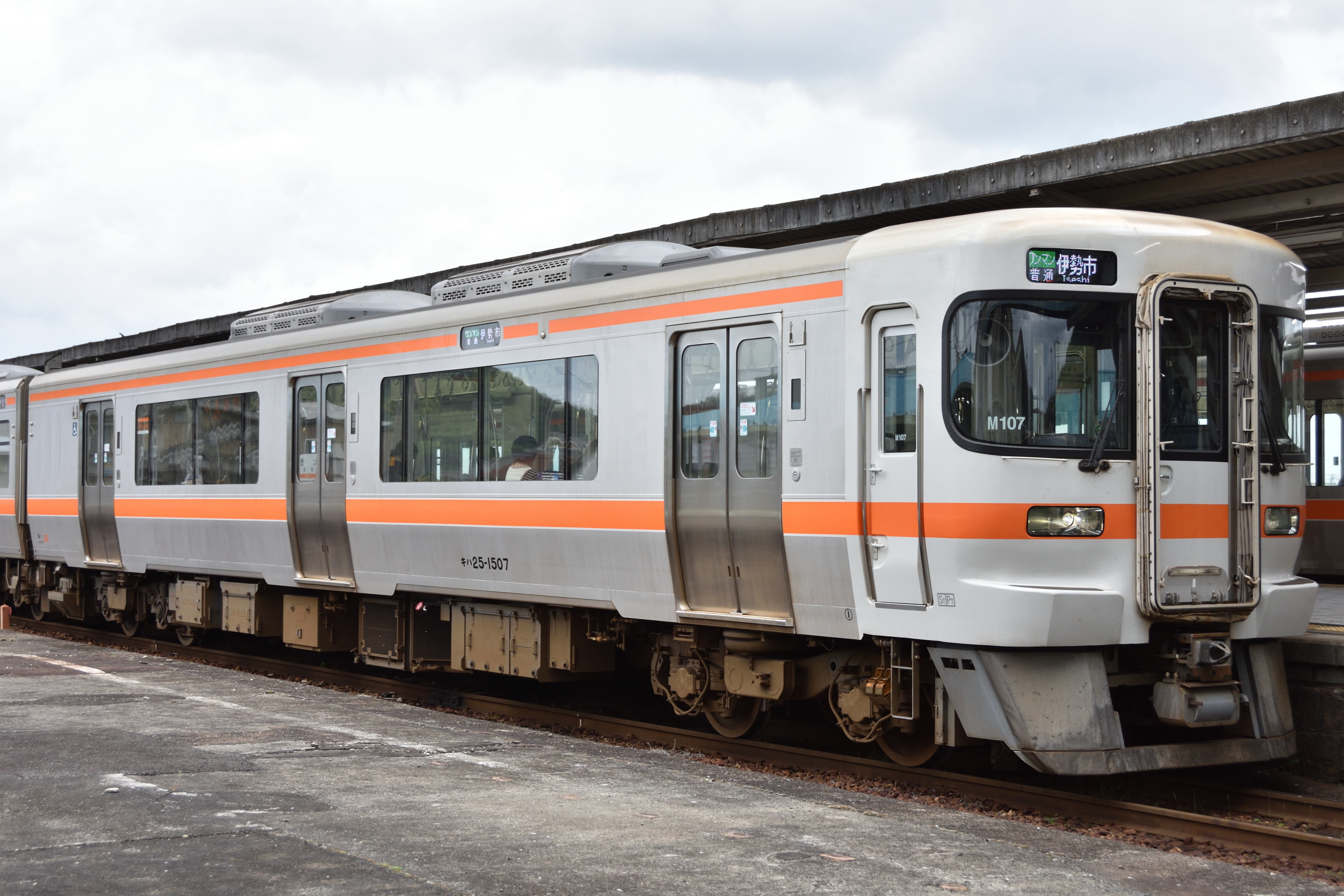
KiHa 25-1507 of set M107 in May 2016

== Exterior ==
The car bodies are constructed of stainless steel and are based on JR Central's 313 series electric multiple unit design. The beading on the lower bodyside was discontinued on the second-batch units, giving flush body sides. The second-batch units have cushions on the front-end skirts to prevent damage from collisions with deer.

== Interior ==
Seating in the first-batch units (P1 to P5) consists of transverse flip-over seats arranged 2+2 abreast, with interiors based on the 313-1300 series EMU design. The second-batch sets (P101 onward) have longitudinal seating.

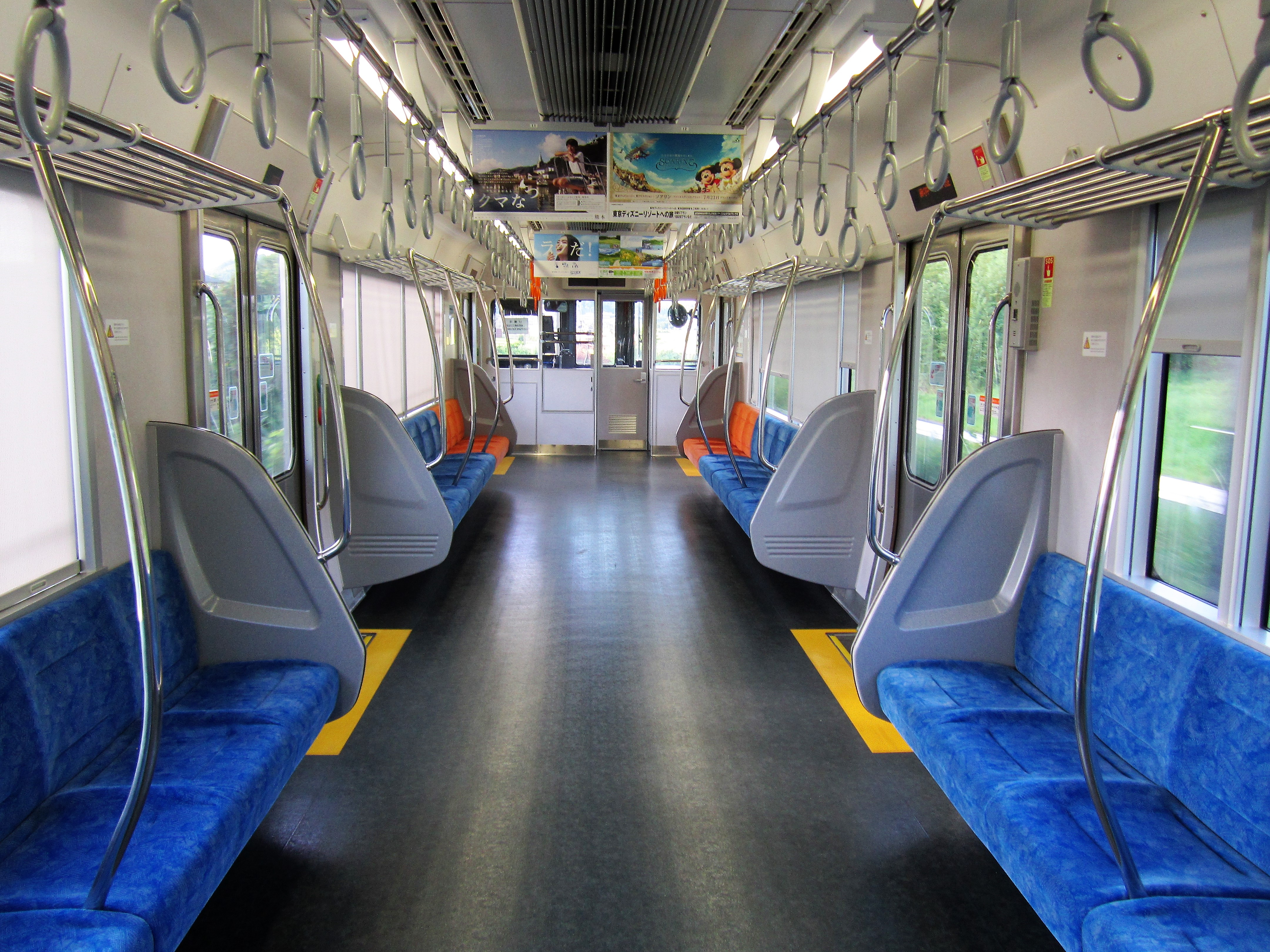
Interior of a second-batch KiHa 25 car

== History ==
The first two sets, P1 and P2, were delivered from the Nippon Sharyo factory in Toyokawa to Nagoya on 10 November 2010. The remaining three sets, P3 to P5, were delivered on 23 February 2011.

The type entered service on the Taketoyo Line from 1 March 2011.

A second batch of KiHa 25 series trains is on order by JR Central, with a total of 52 new vehicles scheduled to be introduced between fiscal 2014 and 2015 on the Takayama Main Line, Taita Line, Kisei Main Line, and Sangu Line, at a cost of approximately 12 billion yen, replacing all remaining former JNR-era DMUs, including KiHa 40, KiHa 47, and KiHa 48 types. The new batch of trains will include LED interior lighting.

The first three new second-batch sets were delivered from the Nippon Sharyo factory in Toyokawa in September 2014.

== See also ==
- 313 series, EMU counterpart
