= Rikyū-in =

Palace in Mie Prefecture, Japan

- 離宮院跡 (Japanese)
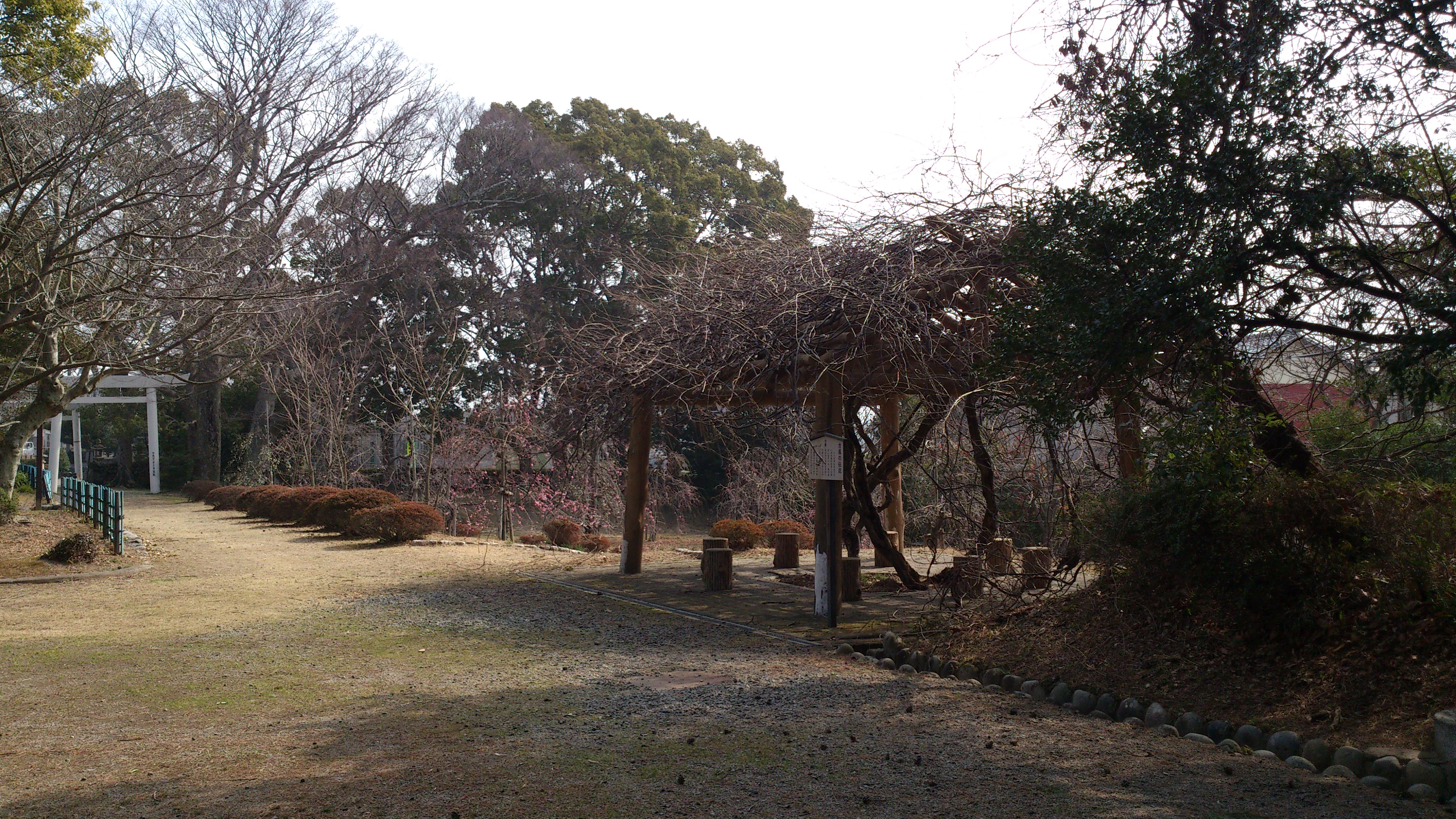
- Rikyū-in

- Rikyū-in Rikyū-in (Japan)
- 34°30′9.0″N 136°40′23.1″E
- Periods: Nara to Heian period
- Location: Ise, Mie, Japan
- Region: Kansai region

History
- Built: 798 AD

Site notes
- Public access: Yes (Park)

The Rikyū-in (離宮院跡) is the ruins of a detached palace located in the Obata neighborhood of the city of Ise, Mie Prefecture, Japan. It was designated a National Historic Site in 1924.

== Overview ==
The Rikyū-in was a detached palace of Ise Grand Shrine, and was one of the residences of the Saiō, an unmarried female member of the Japanese Imperial Family, sent to Ise to serve at Ise Grand Shrine from the late 7th century until the 14th century. The Saiō presided over the most important festivals held at the shrine: the Tsukinamisai, which was held in June and December, and the Kannamesai Festival in September. As the Saikū, or main residence of the Saiō, was located some distance away from the shrines, the Saiō would stay at this palace three times each year for these ceremonies.

The Rikyū-in was used as an official guest house for the imperial messengers visiting Ise Grand Shrine for various official ceremonies, and later became an official dormitory for priests associated with the shrine. The official kitchens, where food was prepared as sacred offerings to the shrine, were also located within this complex.

The palace was built in 798 AD, after the previous complex located in what is now the Miyajiri neighborhood of Ise was destroyed by flooding. The Saiō was relocated to this area for 15 years from 824 to 839. During this period, the Rikyū-in also served as a major government office complex with more than 500 people, and occupied a compound that measured 900 meters east-to-west by 400 meters north-to-south. It was destroyed by fire in 839 AD, and although rebuilt a few years later, the Saiō never returned, preferring to remain at the Saikū palace complex instead. The Rikyū-in was destroyed by arson in 1102, and was mostly in ruins by the start of the Kamakura period.

Much of the site was destroyed by the construction of Miyagawa Station and the Sangū Line railway, and the remainder of the site is now preserved as the "Rikyuin Park". It is located 5-minute walk from Miyagawa Station on the JR Sangū Line.

== See also ==
- List of Historic Sites of Japan (Mie)
- Saikū
