= Matsushita Station =

Railway station in Ise, Mie Prefecture, Japan

Matsushita Station 松下駅
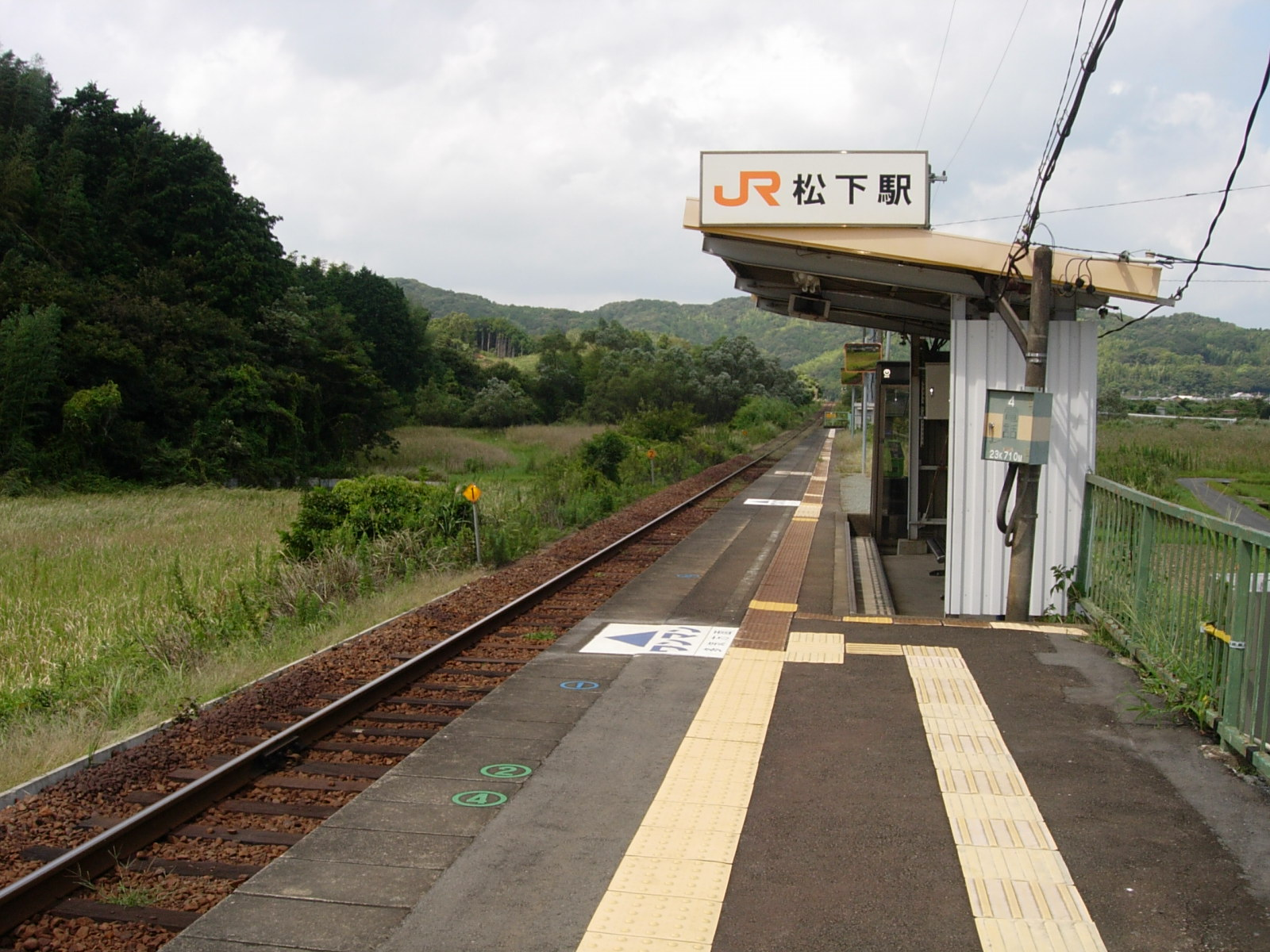
- Matsushita Station

General information
- Location: 776 Matsushita Futamigaura-cho, Ise-shi, Mie-ken 519-0601; Japan
- Coordinates: 34.4959°N 136.7995°E
- Operator: JR Tōkai
- Line: ■ Sangū Line
- Distance: 23.7 km from Taki
- Platforms: 1 side platform
- Connections: Bus terminal

History
- Opened: April 1, 1963; 63 years ago

Passengers
- FY2019: 33 daily
Location
- Location within Mie Prefecture Location within Japan

Matsushita Station (松下駅, Matsushita-eki) is a passenger railway station in located in the city of Ise, Mie Prefecture, Japan, operated by Central Japan Railway Company (JR Tōkai).

== Lines ==
Matsushita Station is served by the Sangū Line, and is located 23.7 rail kilometers from the terminus of the line at Taki Station.

== Station layout ==
The station consists of one side platform serving a single bi-directional track. There is no station building, and the station is unattended.

=== Platforms ===
1	■ Sangū Line	For Taki; For Toba

== Adjacent stations ==
«	Service	»
JR Sangū Line
Futaminoura	Local	Toba
Futaminoura	Rapid Mie	Toba

== History ==
Matsushita Station opened on April 1, 1963 as a station on the Japan National Railways (JNR) Sangū Line. The station was absorbed into the JR Central network upon the privatization of the (JNR) on April 1, 1987.

== Passenger statistics ==
In fiscal 2019, the station was used by an average of 33 passengers daily (boarding passengers only).

== Surrounding area ==
- Futami Sea Paradise
- Japan National Route 42

== See also ==
- List of railway stations in Japan
