= Futaminoura Station =

Railway station in Ise, Mie Prefecture, Japan

Futaminoura Station 二見浦駅
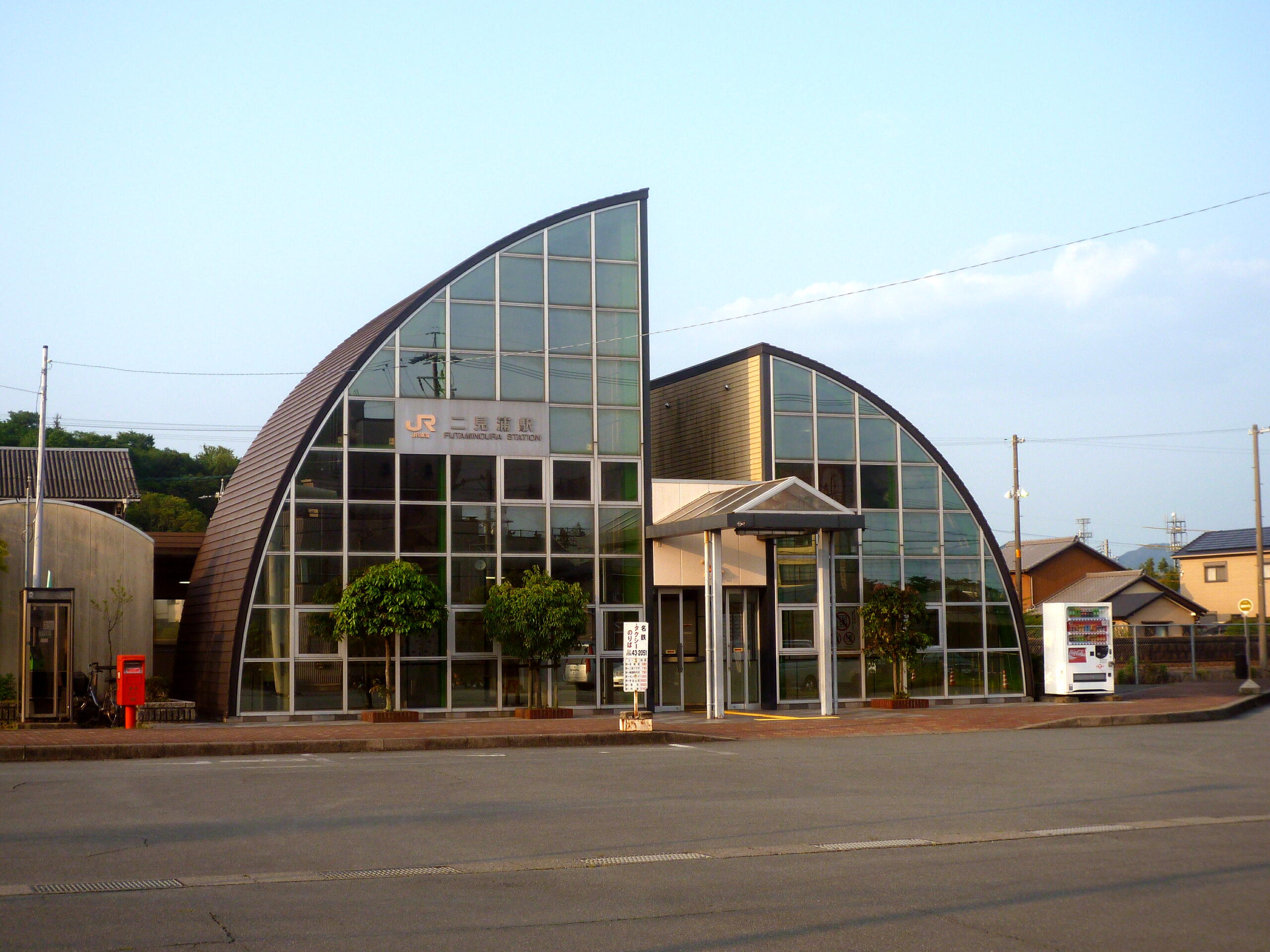
- Futaminoura Station

General information
- Location: 70 Sanzu, Futaminoura-cho, Ise-shi, Mie-ken 519-0603; Japan
- Coordinates: 34.5036°N 136.7781°E
- Operator: JR Tōkai
- Line: ■ Sangū Line
- Distance: 21.4 km from Taki
- Platforms: 1 island platforms
- Connections: Bus terminal

History
- Opened: July 21, 1911; 115 years ago

Passengers
- FY2019: 259 daily
Location
- Location within Mie Prefecture Location within Japan

Futaminoura Station (二見浦駅, Futaminoura-eki) is a passenger railway station in located in the city of Ise, Mie Prefecture, Japan, operated by Central Japan Railway Company (JR Tōkai).

== Lines ==
Futaminoura Station is served by the Sangū Line, and is located 21.4 rail kilometers from the terminus of the line at Taki Station.

== Station layout ==
The station consists of one island platform connected to the station building by an underground passage. The station building is designed to resemble the famed ”Wedded Rocks” after which the station is named.

=== Platforms ===
1	■ Sangū Line	For Toba
2	■ Sangū Line	for Iseshi, Matsusaka, Kameyama, Yokkaichi and Nagoya

== Adjacent stations ==
«	Service	»
JR Sangū Line
Isuzugaoka or Iseshi	Rapid Mie	Matsushita or Toba
Isuzugaoka	Local	Matsushita

== History ==
Futaminoura Station opened on July 21, 1911 as a station on the Japanese Government Railways (JGR) Sangū Line, which became the Japan National Railways (JNR) after World War II. A new station building was completed in 1942; however, the station was rebuilt 300 meters from its original location in 1953. The station was absorbed into the JR Central network upon the privatization of the JNR on April 1, 1987. A new station building was completed in 1993. The station has been unattended since April 2011.

== Passenger statistics ==
In fiscal 2019, the station was used by an average of 259 passengers daily (boarding passengers only).

== Surrounding area ==
- The Wedded Rocks (Futami Okitama Shrine)
- Edo Wonderland
- Sun Arena
- Japan National Route 42

== See also ==
- List of railway stations in Japan
