= JR-Central Transport Service Company =

Railway company in Aichi Prefecture, Japan

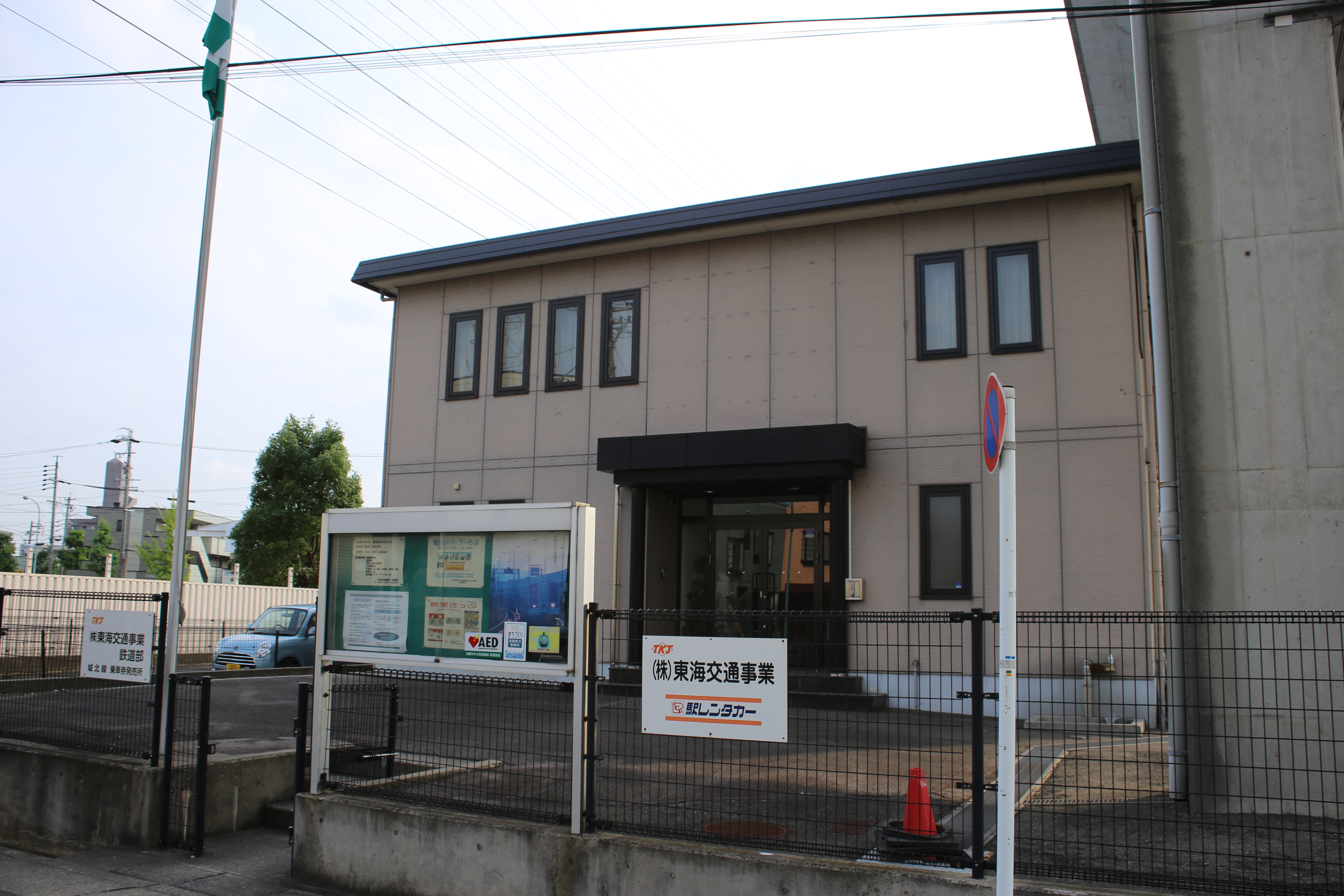
The company headquarters in Nishi-ku, Nagoya

JR-Central Transport Service Company (株式会社JR東海交通事業, Kabushiki-gaisha Jeiāru Tōkai kōtsū jigyō), formerly Tokai Transport Service Company, and abbreviated "TKJ", is a railway operating company in Aichi Prefecture, Japan. It is a wholly owned subsidiary of Central Japan Railway Company (JR Central).

== Lines ==
TKJ operates only one line, the 11.2 km Jōhoku Line. The rail facilities are operated by JR Central, and the trains are run by TKJ.

== History ==
The company was founded on 18 February 1988.

On July 12, 2024, it was announced that the company name would be changing from Tokai Transport Service Co., Ltd. to JR-Central Transport Service Co., Ltd. (adding "JR" to the beginning and translating the word "Tokai" in its English name), effective October 1, 2024, to clearly identify it as a subsidiary of JR Central. Its logo and abbreviation remained unchanged.
