= Mie (train) =

Japanese rapid train service

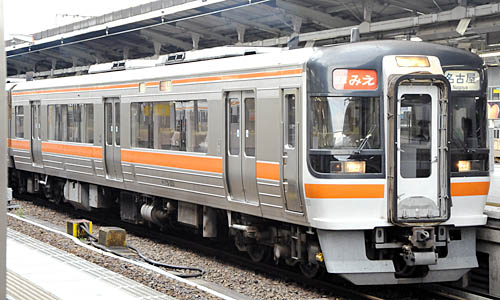
- Rapid Mie service at Nagoya station, April 2011

Overview
- Service type: Rapid
- Status: In operation
- First service: 10 March 1990
- Current operator(s): JR Central

Route
- Termini: Nagoya; Iseshi, Toba
- Stops: 17
- Distance travelled: 122.5 km (76.1 mi) (Nagoya - Toba)
- Average journey time: 1 hour 30 minutes approx (Nagoya - Iseshi); 1 hour 45 minutes approx (Nagoya - Toba)
- Service frequency: 13 return workings daily
- Line(s) used: Kansai Main Line, Ise Railway Ise Line, Kisei Main Line, Sangū Line

On-board services
- Class(es): Standard only
- Disabled access: Yes
- Sleeping arrangements: None
- Catering facilities: None
- Observation facilities: None
- Entertainment facilities: None
- Other facilities: Toilets

Technical
- Rolling stock: KiHa 75 series DMU
- Electrification: Diesel
- Operating speed: 120 km/h (75 mph)
- Track owner(s): JR Central, Ise Railway

The Mie (みえ) is a Rapid train service in Japan operated by Central Japan Railway Company (JR Central), which runs from Nagoya to Iseshi and Toba. The service passes through several significant locations en route, such as Tsu, the capital city of Mie Prefecture.

== History ==
The service was introduced on 10 March 1990 as a way to compete with Kintetsu Railway and to provide a cheap, quick, and efficient route from Nagoya to the Ise Peninsula. The Mie is faster than a Kintetsu express train but slower than a Kintetsu limited express train. Kintetsu still maintains superior numbers of passengers to this day.

== Route ==
The train stops at the following stations:

Nagoya - Kuwana - Yokkaichi - Suzuka - (Suzuka Circuit Inō) - (Nakaseko) - Tsu - Matsusaka - Taki - (Tokida) - (Tamaru) - (Miyagawa) - (Yamada-Kamiguchi) - Iseshi - (Isuzugaoka) - Futaminoura - (Matsushita) - Toba

Nakaseko is only served by a few Nagoya-bound services. Suzuka Circuit Inō is only served on days of racing events at the nearby Suzuka Circuit. Other stations in brackets are not served by all trains.

Between Yokkaichi and Tsu, the train runs along the private Ise Railway Ise Line. An additional fee of 520 yen is required for Japan Rail Pass holders to ride the train in this section, and fares are coordinated for prices between JR and Ise Railway to be the same. IC cards such as TOICA are not supported if traveling south of Yokkaichi Station.

From Nagoya to Taki, the train follows the same route and generally the same stopping pattern as the Nanki limited express.

== Service ==
There are 13 daily departures in each direction, approximately one train an hour in each direction for most of the day. Services that run after the 17:37 departure from Nagoya terminate at Iseshi and do not continue to Toba. On weekends and holidays, there is an extra service departing Nagoya station at 7:43 in the morning for Iseshi. The Mie is serviced by KiHa 75 series DMUs, usually in 2 or 4 car formations. 6 cars may occasionally be used in busy seasons and on days of special events, such as a race at the Suzuka Circuit.

== Facilities ==
Only standard class is available on this service and there is no green car seating. Seat reservations can be made for an extra fee. There are universal access toilets onboard, as well as wheelchair spaces. There are no catering services.
