= Iseshi Station =

Railway station in Ise, Mie Prefecture, Japan

Iseshi Station 伊勢市駅
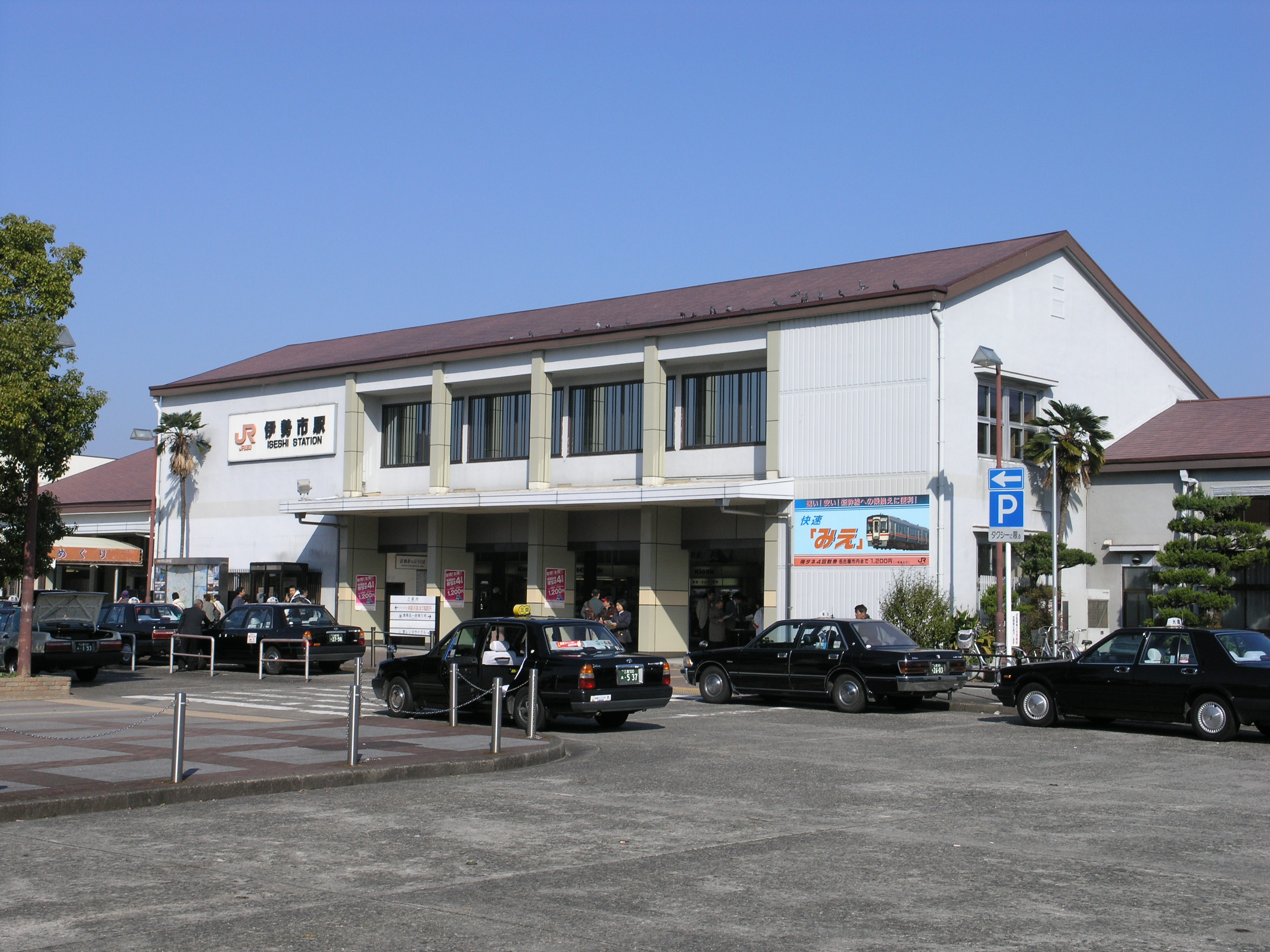
- Iseshi Station, JR side

General information
- Location: 1-1-4 Fukiage, Ise-shi, Mie-ken 516-0073; Japan
- Coordinates: 34.4918°N 136.7098°E
- Operator: JR Central; Kintetsu Railway
- Lines: ■ Sangū Line; Yamada Line
- Platforms: 1 island + 3 side platforms

Other information
- Website: Official website

History
- Opened: November 11, 1897; 128 years ago
- Former names: Yamada (until 1959)

Passengers
- FY2019: 1260 (JR); 4174(Kintetsu) daily
Location
- Location within Mie Prefecture Location within Japan

Iseshi Station (伊勢市駅, Iseshi-eki) is a union passenger railway station located in the city of Ise, Mie Prefecture, Japan, operated by JR Central and the private railway operator Kintetsu Railway.

== Lines ==
Iseshi Station is served by the JR Sangū Line and is 15.0 rail kilometers from the terminus of theline at Taki Station. The station is also served by the Yamada Line, and is located 27.7 rail kilometers from the starting point of that line at Ujiyamada Station.

== Station layout ==
Iseshi Station has a single island platform and a side platform serving the 3 tracks used by JR Central. The station is staffed. The Kintetsu portion of the station has two opposed side platforms. JR Central station is responsible for the administration of the section between Tamaru Station and Toba Station. The Kintetsu station is administrated by Ujiyamada Station. All of the platforms are connected by a footbridge.

=== Platforms ===
1	■ Sangū Line	for Matsusaka, Kameyama, Yokkaichi and Nagoya
2	■ Sangū Line	for Futaminoura and Toba
3	■ Sangū Line	for Matsusaka, Kameyama, Yokkaichi and Nagoya (partly) for Futaminoura and Toba (partly)
4	■ Yamada Line	for Nagoya, Osaka, Kobe and Kyoto
5	■ Yamada Line	for Isuzugawa (Naiku-mae), Toba and Kashikojima

== Adjacent stations ==
«	Service	»
Sangū Line
Yamada-Kamiguchi	Local	Isuzugaoka or Terminus
Taki	Rapid "Mie" (usually)	Futaminoura
Taki	Rapid "Mie" (stopping every station between Iseshi and Toba; 1 (Weekday), 51 (ex weekday), 15, 17, 4, 6, 8, 10, 24, 26)	Isuzugaoka
Miyagawa	Rapid "Mie" 4 for Nagoya	Isuzugaoka
Yamada-Kamiguchi	Rapid "Mie" 2 starting for Nagoya; Rapid "Mie" 19, 21, 23, 25 terminating at Iseshi	Terminus
Yamada Line
Miyamachi	Local	Ujiyamada
Matsusaka; Miyamachi	Express	Ujiyamada
Matsusaka	Rapid Express	Ujiyamada
Matsusaka	Limited Express	Ujiyamada
Tsuruhashi (Osaka Line); Tsu (Nagoya Line)	Non-stop Limited Express	Ujiyamada
Yamato-Yagi (Osaka Line); Kintetsu-Yokkaichi (Nagoya Line)	Limited Express "Shimakaze"	Ujiyamada

== History ==
Iseshi Station opened on November 11, 1897, as Yamada Station (山田駅, Yamada-eki) on the privately owned Sangū Railway. The line was nationalized on October 1, 1907, becoming part of the Japanese Government Railway (JGR) network. The Sangū Electric Express Railway (later known as the Yamada Line) began operations on September 21, 1930. The station building was rebuilt in May 1950, and the Kintetsu portion in 1953. The station was renamed to its present name on July 15, 1959.

== Passenger statistics ==
In fiscal 2019, the JR station was used by an average of 1260 passengers daily and they Kintetsu station by 4174 passengers daily (boarding passengers only).

== Surrounding area ==
- Ise Grand Shrine: Outer Shrine
- JR Central Iseshi train depot

== See also ==
- List of railway stations in Japan
