= Sangū Line =

Railway line Mie prefecture, Japan

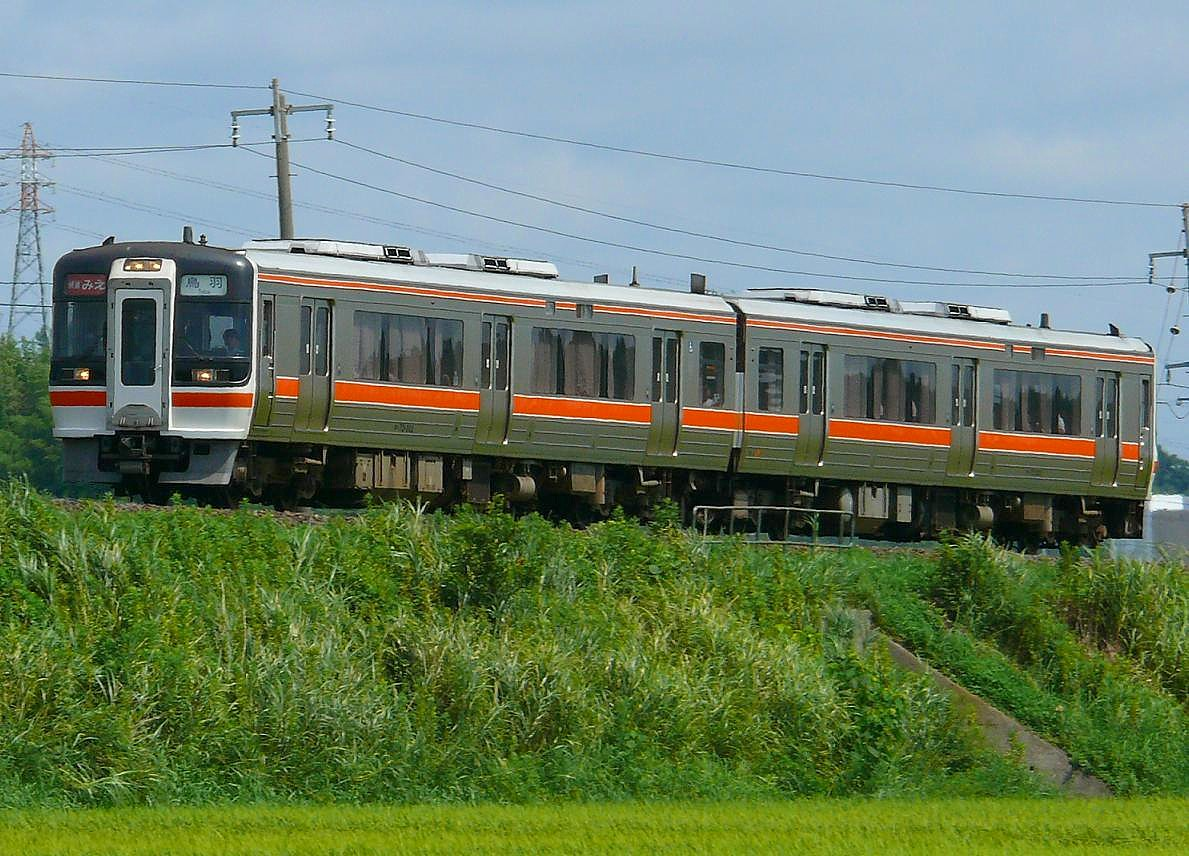
- Mie Rapid service

Overview
- Status: In operation
- Owner: JR Central
- Locale: Mie Prefecture
- Termini: Taki; Toba
- Stations: 10

Service
- Type: Commuter rail
- Operator: JR Central
- Rolling stock: KiHa 75 series DMU, KiHa 25 series DMU

History
- Opened: July 21, 1911; 114 years ago

Technical
- Line length: 29.1 km (18.1 mi)
- Number of tracks: Entire line single tracked
- Character: Rural with urban sections
- Track gauge: 1,067 mm (3 ft 6 in)
- Electrification: None
- Operating speed: 100 km/h (62 mph)

The Sangū Line (参宮線, Sangū-sen) is a railway line run by Central Japan Railway Company (JR Central), connecting Taki Station (Taki, Mie) with Toba Station (Toba, Mie) in Japan.

The line connects with the Kisei Main Line at Taki Station. From Taki, the line runs parallel to the Kintetsu Yamada Line and Toba Line. These lines all serve the Ise-Shima tourist region.

The name of the line, "Sangū", was chosen because that word is a kanji abbreviation of a phrase in Japanese that roughly translates to "a pilgrimage to Ise Grand Shrine", and making the pilgrimage to the Shrine easier is exactly why the line was built.

== Service ==
LO Local (普通 futsū)

For Taki, Kameyama
For Iseshi, Toba
Locals stop at every station.
Almost all trains are wanman driver-only services.
Trains run approximately once an hour in each direction.

MR Mie Rapid (快速みえ kaisoku-mie)

For Nagoya; via Tsu and Yokkaichi
For Iseshi, Toba
Seat reservations can be made.
Trains run approximately once an hour in each direction.

=== Competition with Kintetsu ===
Kintetsu and JR Central have parallel lines running all the way from Nagoya to Toba that compete heavily. For Kintetsu, this includes their Nagoya Line, Yamada Line, and Toba Line, and on the JR side it includes parts of the Kansai Main Line, the Ise Railway, Kisei Main Line and the Sangū Line.

== Stations ==
- Key

● Trains stop here
○ Some trains stop here

Formerly, there was a seasonal station named Ikenoura Seaside between Matsushita and Toba. However, the station was permanently closed on 14 March 2020, owing to declining passenger numbers over several years.

Station		Dist (km)	Transfers	LO	MR	Location	
Taki	多気	0.0	Kisei Main Line	●	●	Taki	Mie Prefecture
Tokida	外城田	3.3		●	○	Taki	Mie Prefecture
Tamaru	田丸	7.0		●	○	Tamaki	Mie Prefecture
Miyagawa	宮川	11.0		●	○	Ise	Mie Prefecture
Yamada-Kamiguchi	山田上口	13.2		●	○	Ise	Mie Prefecture
Iseshi	伊勢市	15.0	Kintetsu Yamada Line	●	●	Ise	Mie Prefecture
Isuzugaoka	五十鈴ヶ丘	17.9		●	○	Ise	Mie Prefecture
Futaminoura	二見浦	21.4		●	●	Ise	Mie Prefecture
Matsushita	松下	23.7		●	○	Ise	Mie Prefecture
Toba	鳥羽	29.1	Kintetsu Toba Line, Shima Line	●	●	Toba	Mie Prefecture

== Rolling stock ==
- KiHa 25 series diesel multiple units (DMUs) (since 1 August 2015)
- KiHa 75 series DMUs

== History ==
=== Overview ===
The Sangū Line is one of the oldest railway lines in Mie Prefecture and was the first railway built to provide passage to Ise Grand Shrine. Though mostly built by a private company, the line was owned and operated by the Japanese national government for 80 years before becoming part of JR Central. Since it was the original train route to Ise Grand Shrine, it historically saw more frequent trains and passengers than it does today. However, competition with rival Kintetsu hurt ridership on the line over the years to the point that some even proposed selling or abandoning the line at times.

=== Sangū Railway ===
The line was originally conceived and partially built by the Sangū Railway (参宮鉄道, Sangū Tetsudō) in the late 19th century during the Meiji era. During the Edo era, Ise Grand Shrine in what is now Ise, Mie Prefecture became an extremely popular place for pilgrimages due to its special significance within Shinto. When Japan started construction of its major railway lines during the Meiji Restoration, there was a call to build a branch line that would connect Ise Grand Shrine with the rest of Japan. Sangū Railway was formed for this purpose, and they began building what is now one of the oldest railroads in Mie Prefecture. The line was built as far as Yamada Station (now Iseshi) under Sangū Railway but was then acquired by the national government under the Railway Nationalization Act of 1906.

=== Government ownership ===
Under ownership of the government, the line was extended to its present endpoint of Toba Station. In the first quarter of the 20th century, before the outbreak of World War II, the Sangū Line came to be considered a major line due to its importance in providing transportation for pilgrims to Ise Grand Shrine. Express trains providing direct service to and from Tokyo, Osaka, and as far away as Uno Station in Okayama Prefecture were running at this time, and dual tracks were added to many parts of the line to allow for an increase in the frequency of trains. However, through the ownership of the government, these dual tracks were dug up near the end of the war and were used as emergency scrap metal for military operations.

After the war, the Sangū Line saw its first rival railway line which was owned by Kintetsu who offered express service from Osaka and Nagoya. However, the Sangū Line maintained its competitive edge in the 1940s and 1950s because Kintetsu was, at the time, not yet able to offer direct service from Nagoya due to differences in track gauge, so passengers that were coming to Ise Grand Shrine via Nagoya were forced to change trains during the journey if they took Kintetsu, thus many people opted to take the government-owned Kokutetsu option instead since it was direct.

In the 1960s, there was a plan to rebuild the dual tracks that had been taken away by the government during the war but the plan encountered some problems. By 1960, Kintetsu had altered its Nagoya Line to utilize the same gauge as the rest of its lines and therefore direct Kintetsu service was now available. A few years later, Kintetsu acquired its Kyoto Line and thus it was now offering direct service from Kyoto as well as Osaka and Nagoya. Finally, Kintetsu built its Toba Line, which created competition along the only remaining section of the Sangū Line that had previously had no rival. All this combined led to reduced ridership which in turn led Kokutetsu to revoke the Sangū Line's status as a major line; the line became classified as a local line and the plan to rebuild the dual tracks was abandoned. Kokutetsu was even advised in 1968 to permanently close the Iseshi to Toba section of the line, however they opted instead to discontinue direct express service from various major cities in the following years. This issue of permanently closing the line arose again in the early 1980s, however after a close inspection of the daily number of riders on the line it narrowly avoided being re-classified as a third sector railway and survived the transition to JR in 1987.

=== Mie Rapid ===
In 1988, under new ownership by JR Central, direct services from Nagoya were resumed for the first time in twenty years to compete with Kintetsu. This train was originally called the Mie Home Liner and, at the time, was only offered seasonally. Direct services were only provided as far as Matsusaka on the Kisei Main Line. However in 1991, the train was renamed to its current name of Mie Rapid and services were extended to the Sangū Line to serve Ise, Futami and Toba. Historically, direct services from Nagoya were considered expresses and therefore passengers were subject to additional fees. But the Mie Rapid is officially classified as a "rapid" and thus there are no extra fees above the standard fare; this was done to compete with the Kintetsu Limited Express trains, which require extra fees. The Mie Rapid has been successful at making JR a more viable option for tourists visiting the Ise-Shima area, though Kintetsu still maintains superior passenger numbers.

=== 2007 closure proposal ===
In May 2007, the chairman of the Akafuku group, Masutane Hamada, suggested that the Sangū Line be closed and the train inspection depot at Iseshi Station be transformed into a parking lot. This plan was put forth in hopes of alleviating traffic jams caused by pilgrims coming to Ise in 2013 to celebrate the rebuilding of Ise Grand Shrine. Hamada has tried to point out to other leaders in the area, including the Mayor of Ise, that "the Sangū Line is a large-scale obstruction and the Iseshi Station depot could hold 1000 cars if turned into a parking lot". The Mayor of Ise decided to request a year-long serious study of ridership on the line before making any decisions. JR Central, opposes Hamada's proposal and the company president has said he has not heard widespread demand for the line to be closed. Hamada himself has even admitted that the proposal is unlikely to be realized.

=== Timeline ===
Emblem of Sangū Railway

- December 12, 1893 - Tsu to Miyagawa section opens. Trains are operated by Sangū Railway.
- November 11, 1897 - Miyagawa to Yamada (now Iseshi) sections opens.
- October 1, 1907 - Line sold to Japanese national government under the Railway Nationalization Act.
- February 21, 1909 - Second track opens on the Sujikaibashi (now Yamada-Kamiguchi) to Yamada section.
- October 12, 1909 - Origin of the line changes from Tsu to Kameyama. Kameyama to Yamada officially named Sangū Line.
- December 30, 1909 - Second track opens on the Ōka (now Taki) to Miyagawa section.
- July 21, 1911 - Yamada ~ Toba extension opens. Toba becomes terminus of the line.
- October 10, 1917 - Sujikaibashi Station officially renamed Yamada-Kamiguchi Station.
- March 20, 1923 - Ōka Station officially renamed Ōka-guchi Station.
- August 1, 1944 - Second track closes on all sections. Metal given to the military for war efforts.
- July 15, 1959 - Ōka-guchi Station officially renamed Taki Station. Yamada Station officially renamed Iseshi Station. Kameyama to Taki section, originally part of the Sangū Line, is reclassified as part of the Kisei Main Line. Sangū Line becomes only the Taki to Toba section.
- April 1, 1963 - Tokida, Isuzugaoka, and Matsushita stations open.
- July 1, 1969 - Ise to Toba freight service ends.
- October 1, 1982 - Miyagawa to Ise freight service ends.
- December 21, 1983 - Centralized traffic control signaling system activated.
- April 1, 1986 - Taki to Miyagawa freight service ends.
- April 1, 1987 - Kokutetsu becomes JR Group. Line becomes part of JR Central.
- March 11, 1989 - Wanman driver-only train service begins.
- March 21, 1990 - Ikenoura Seaside Station opens.
- March 16, 1991 - Mie Rapid service begins.
- March 14, 2020 - Ikenoura Seaside Station closes, due to low passenger numbers.

=== Former connecting lines ===
- Iseshi station - The 39km Kintetsu Ise line to Edobashi on the Kintetsu Nagoya Line opened in 1917, and was electrified at 1500 VDC in 1926. The last 19km closed in 1942, and the remainder of the line closed in 1961.
