= Taki Station (Mie) =

Railway station in Taki, Mie Prefecture, Japan

Taki Station 多気駅
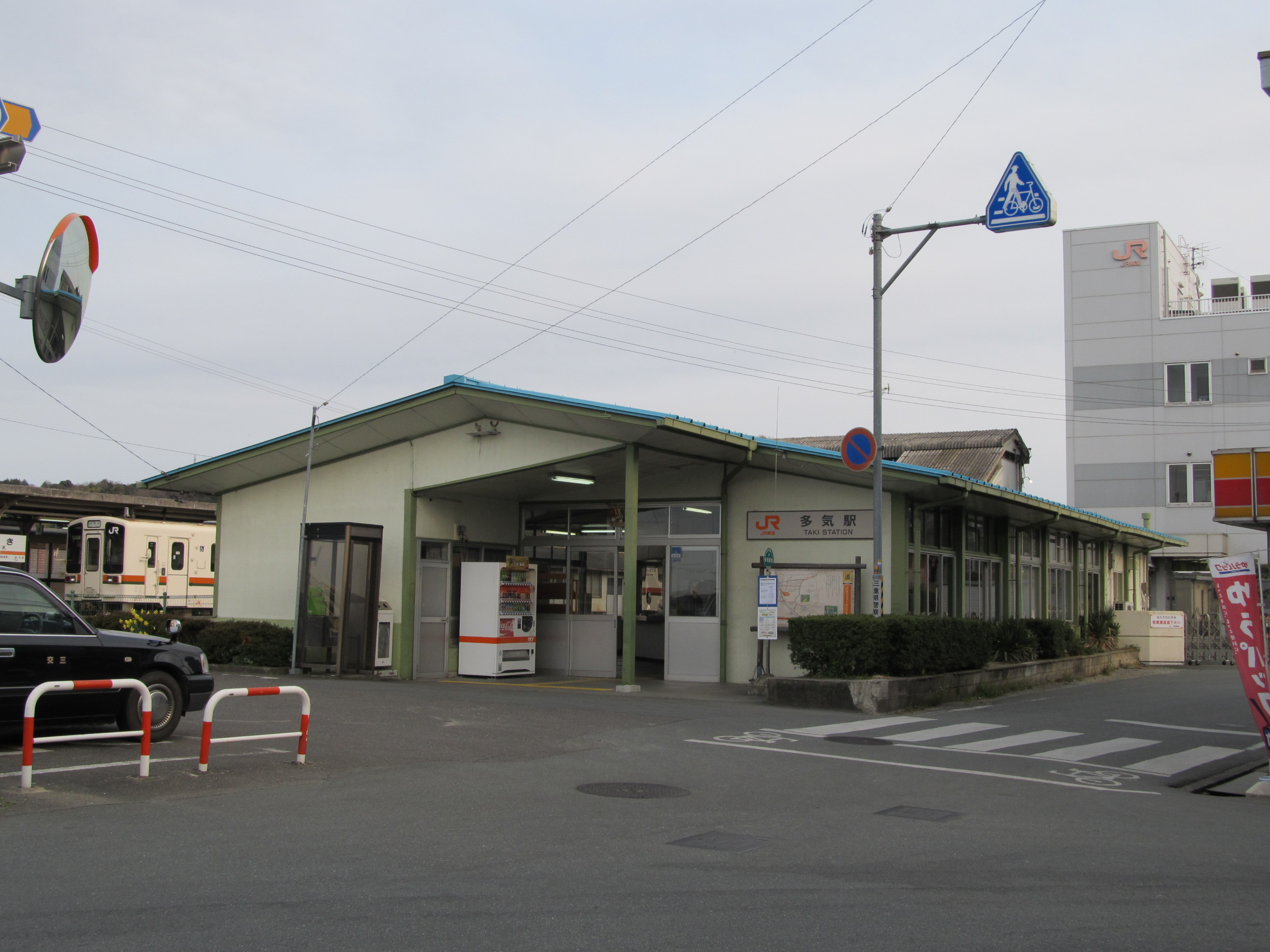
- Taki Station

General information
- Location: 76-1 Taki, Taki-cho, Taki-gun Mie-ken 519-2154; Japan
- Coordinates: 34.516047°N 136.573234°E
- Operator: JR Tōkai
- Lines: ■ Kisei Main Line; ■ Sangū Line
- Distance: 49.6 km from Kameyama
- Platforms: 2 side platforms

Other information
- Status: Staffed (Midori no Madoguchi)
- Website: Official website

History
- Opened: December 31, 1893; 132 years ago
- Former names: Ōka (to 1923); Ōkaguchi (to 1959)

Passengers
- FY2019: 560 daily
Location
- Location within Mie Prefecture Location within Japan

Taki Station (多気駅, Taki-eki) is a junction passenger railway station located in the town of Taki, Taki District, Mie Prefecture, operated by Central Japan Railway Company (JR Central).

== Lines ==
Taki Station is served by the Kisei Main Line and is 42.5 rail kilometers from the terminus of that line at Kameyama Station. It is also the western terminus for the 29.1 kilometer Sangū Line to Toba Station. Irregular freight services are still operated by the Japan Freight Railway Company.

== Station layout ==
The station consists of two island platforms connected by a footbridge. The station has a Midori no Madoguchi staffed ticket office.

=== Platforms ===
1, 2	■ Kisei Main Line	For Matsusaka, Kameyama, Yokkaichi, Kuwana, Nagoya
3, 4	■ Kisei Main Line	For Owase, Shingū, Kii-Katsuura
3, 4	■ Sangū Line	For Iseshi, Futaminoura, Toba

== Adjacent stations ==
«	Service	»
Kisei Main Line
Tokuwa	Local	Ōka or Terminus
Matsusaka	Rapid Mie	Sangū Line
Matsusaka	Limited Express Nanki	Misedani
Sangū Line
Kisei Main Line or Terminus	Local	Tokida
Kisei Line	Rapid Mie (usually)	Iseshi
Kisei Line	Rapid Mie 4 for Nagoya	Tamaru
Kisei Line	Rapid Mie 2 for Nagoya; Rapid Mie 19, 21, 23, 25 for Iseshi	Tokida

== History ==
Taki Station opened on December 31, 1893, as Ōka Station (相可駅, Ōka eki) on the private Sangū Railway. The Sangū Railway was nationalized on October 1, 1907, becoming part of the Japanese Government Railways (JGR) system. On October 20, 1923, the Kisei East Line connected to the station, which was renamed Ōkaguchi Station (相可口駅, Ōkaguchi eki). The JGR became the Japan National Railways (JNR) after World War II, and the station was renamed to its present name on July 15, 1959. The station was absorbed into the JR Central network upon the privatization of the JNR on April 1, 1987. Scheduled freight operations were discontinued from 2016.

== Passenger statistics ==
In fiscal 2019, the station was used by an average of 560 passengers daily (boarding passengers only).

== Surrounding area ==
- Kushida River
- Japan National Route 42
- Old Ise Grand Shrine pilgrimage road
