= Toba Station =

Railway station in Toba, Mie Prefecture, Japan

Toba Station 鳥羽駅
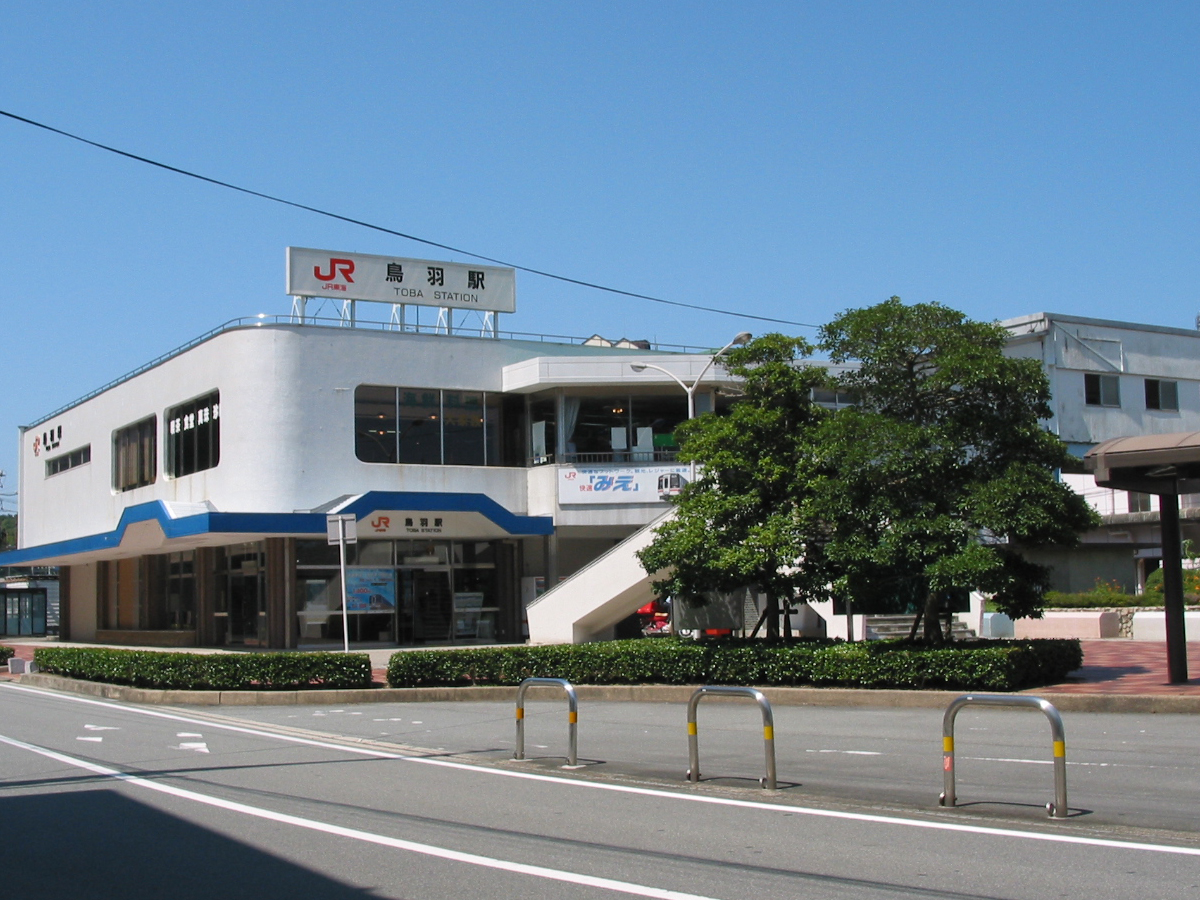
- Toba Station

General information
- Location: 1-8-13 Toba, Toba-shi, Mie-ken 517-0011; Japan
- Coordinates: 34.486467°N 136.8427849°E
- Operator: JR Tōkai; Kintetsu Railway
- Lines: ■ Sangū Line; Toba Line; Shima Line
- Distance: 29.1 km from Taki
- Platforms: 2 bay + 2 island platforms

Other information
- Station code: M78

History
- Opened: July 21, 1911; 115 years ago

Passengers
- FY2019: 318 (JR Central); 1,728 (Kintetsu) daily

Services
| Preceding station | JR Central | Following station |
|---|---|---|
| Matsushita towards Taki | Sangū Line Local Rapid Mie (some) | Terminus |
| Futaminoura towards Taki | Sangū Line Rapid Mie | Terminus |
Location
- Location within Mie Prefecture Location within Japan

Toba Station (鳥羽駅, Toba-eki) is a junction passenger railway station located in the city of Toba, Mie Prefecture. Japan. It is jointly operated by Central Japan Railway Company (JR Central) and the private railway operator Kintetsu Railway.

Toba Station is served by the JR Sangū Line and is 29.1 rail kilometers from the terminus at the Taki Station. It is also served by the Kintetsu Toba Line and Shima Line, and is located 41.5 rail kilometers from the terminus of that line at Ise-Nakagawa Station.

== Station layout ==
The station consists of two bay platforms for JR Central, only one of which is in use, and two island platforms for use by the Kintetsu Lines. Then JR portion of the station is staffed.

=== Platforms ===
| 0 | ■ Not in use | |
| 1 2 | ■ Sangu Line | local trains for Iseshi, Taki, Matsusaka, Tsu and Kameyama Mie rapid trains for Iseshi, Taki, Matsusaka, Tsu, Yokkaichi and Nagoya |
| 3 | ■ Toba Line | for Nagoya and Osaka |
| 4 | ■ Shima Line | for Ugata and Kashikojima |
| 5 6 | ■ Toba Line | for Nagoya and Osaka |

== Adjacent stations ==
| « | Service | » |
Kintetsu Toba ・ Shima Line
| Ujiyamada | Limited Express Shimakaze | Ugata |
| Ujiyamada | Non-stop Limited Express | Shima-Isobe |
| Isuzugawa | Limited Express | Shima-Isobe |
| Ikenoura | Rapid Express | Terminus |
| Ikenoura | Express | Terminus |
| Ikenoura | Local | Nakanogō |

== History ==
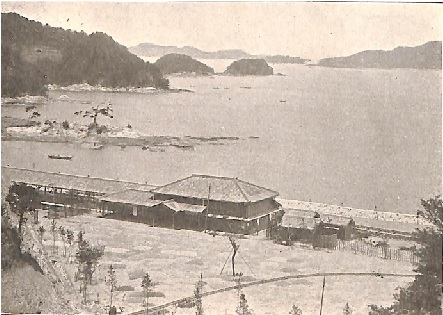
Toba Station in 1911

Toba Station opened on July 21, 1911 as a station on the Japanese Government Railways (JGR) Sangū Line. The Shima Electric Railway connected to the station on July 23, 1929. JGR became the Japanese National Railways (JNR) after World War II. Through a series of mergers, the Shima Electric Railway became the part of the Kintetsu Group by April 1, 1965. The Kintetsu portion of the station was rebuilt in March 1970. The JNR portion of the station burned down in a fire on January 6, 1974 and rebuilt by October 14, 1975. The Kintetsu portion of the station was rebuilt again on July 23, 1999.

== Passenger statistics ==
In fiscal 2019, the JR portion of the station was used by an average of 318 passengers daily (boarding passengers only), whereas the Kintetsu portion of the station was used by 1728 passengers daily.

== Surrounding area ==
- Mikimoto Pearl Island
- Toba Aquarium
- Toba Port and ferries to outlying islands
- Toba International Hotel

== See also ==
- List of railway stations in Japan
