= Central Japan Railway Company =

Japanese railway company

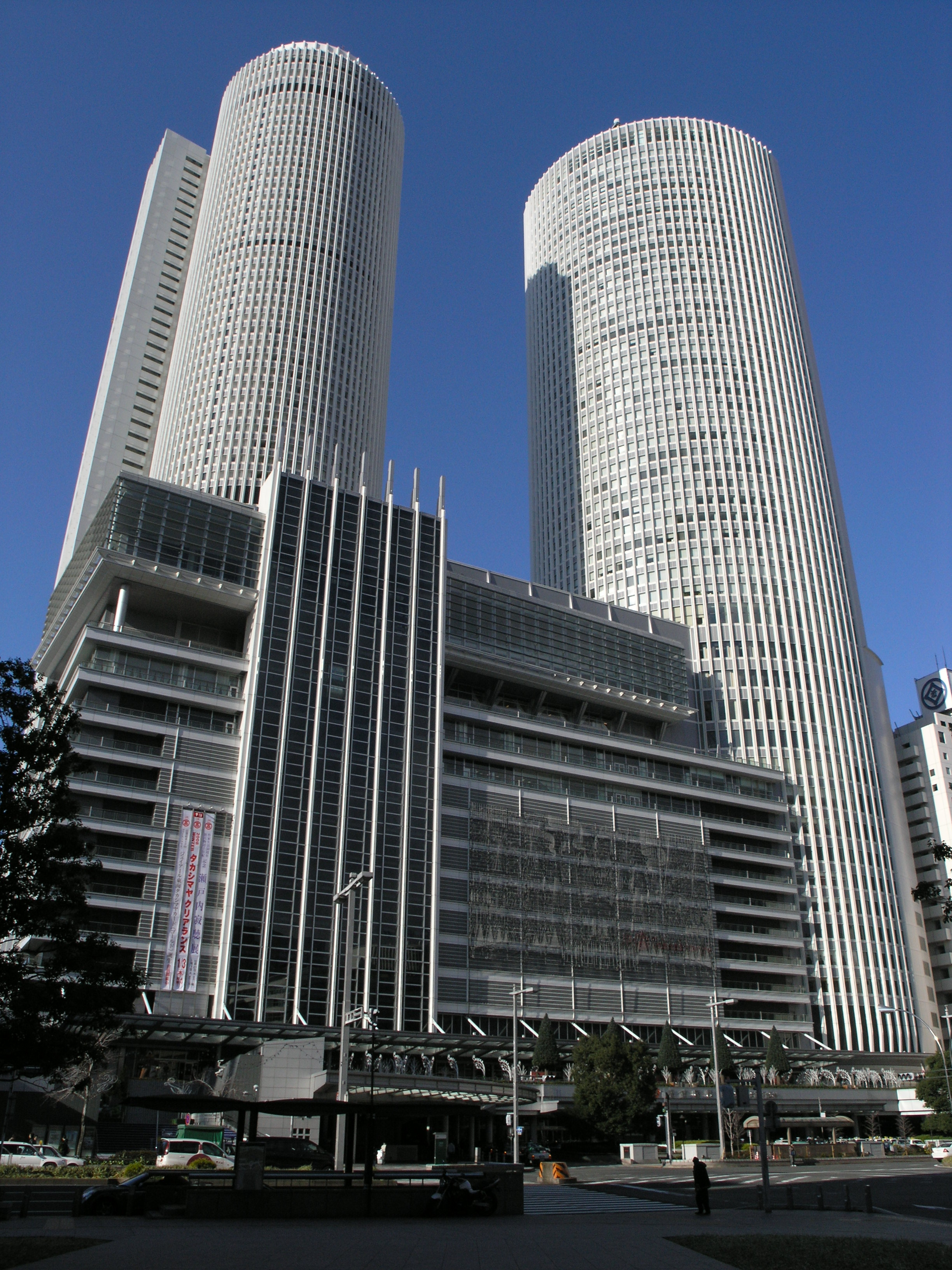
- The JR Central Towers company headquarters located above Nagoya Station
- Native name: 東海旅客鉄道株式会社
- Romanized name: Tōkai Ryokaku Tetsudō kabushiki gaisha
- Type: Public
- Traded as: TYO: 9022; NAG: 9022; Nikkei 225 component (TYO); TOPIX Core30 component (TYO)
- Industry: Private railway
- Predecessor: Japanese National Railways (JNR)
- Founded: 1 April 1987; 39 years ago, privatization of JNR
- Headquarters: JR Central Towers; 1-1-4 Meieki, Nakamura-ku, Nagoya, Aichi 450-6101, Japan
- Area served: Tōkai region
- Key people: Shin Kaneko, Chairman; Shunsuke Niwa, President
- Products: TOICA, EX-IC (a rechargeable contactless smart card)
- Services: passenger railways travel agency services wholesale and retail parking lot operations real estate food and beverage sales casualty insurance other related services
- Revenue: ▲¥1,672,295 million (2014)
- Operating income: ▲¥506,598 million (2014)
- Net income: ▲¥264,134 million (2014)
- Total assets: ▲¥5,217,982 million (2014)
- Total equity: ▲¥2,020,196 million (2014)
- Owner: Public float, largest single shareholder: Mizuho Bank (4.39%)
- Number of employees: 16,193 (as of March 31, 2008)
- Divisions: Conventional lines operations Shinkansen operations
- Subsidiaries: 39 group companies, including Nippon Sharyo (since October 2008)
- Website: https://global.jr-central.co.jp/en/

Central Japan Railway Company

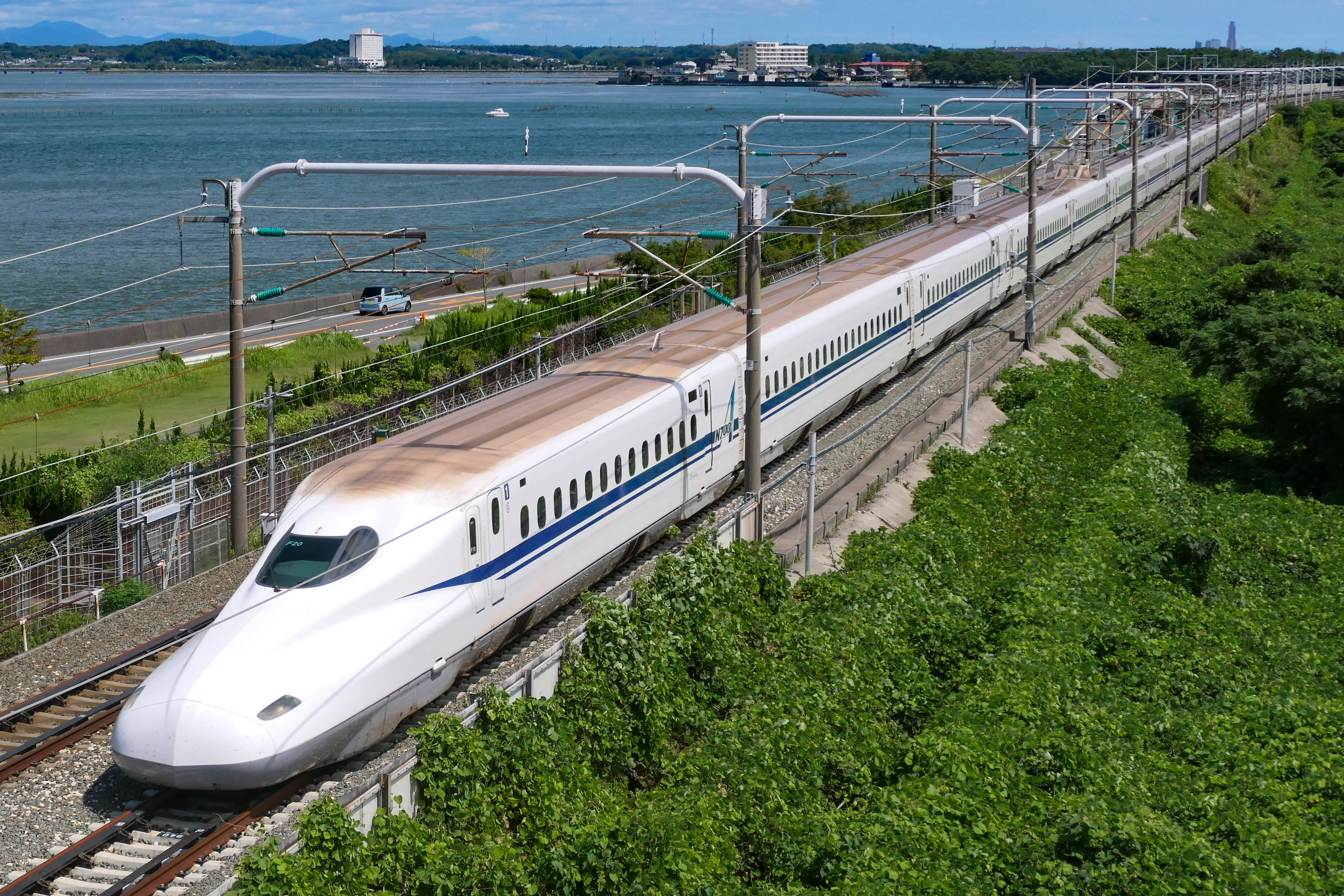
- JR Central N700 Series Shinkansen Nozomi train

Operation
- National railway: Japan Railways Group
- Infrastructure company: Japan Railway Construction, Transport and Technology Agency

Statistics
- Ridership: 0.528 billion per year
- Passenger-distance: 55.811 billion per year

System length
- Total: 1,970.8 km (1,224.6 mi)
- Double track: 1,086.8 km (675.3 mi) (55.1%)
- Electrified: 1,491.7 km (926.9 mi) (75.7%)
- High-speed: 552.6 km (343.4 mi) (28.0%)

Track gauge
- Main: 1,067 mm (3 ft 6 in)
- High-speed: 1,435 mm (4 ft 8 1/2 in)

Electrification
- Main: Overhead line, 1,500 V DC, 1,418.2 km (881.2 mi)
- High-speed: Overhead line, 25 kV 60 Hz AC, 552.6 km (343.4 mi)

Features
- No. of stations: 403
Map
- Service area Shinkansen station layouts TOICA Service Area (in Japanese)

JR Central service region

The Central Japan Railway Company is the main railway company operating in the Chūbu (Nagoya) region of central Japan. It is officially abbreviated in English as JR Central and in Japanese as JR Tōkai (JR東海). The term Tōkai refers to the Tōkai region (the southern portion of Central Japan), in which the company chiefly operates.

JR Central's operational hub is Nagoya Station, and the company's administrative headquarters are located in the JR Central Towers above the building. The busiest and longest railway line operated by JR Central is the Tōkaidō Main Line between Atami and Maibara; this largely parallels the company's high-speed rail service, the Tōkaidō Shinkansen, which runs between Tokyo and Shin-Ōsaka. JR Central is additionally responsible for the Chūō Shinkansen – an under-construction maglev service between Tokyo and Osaka, which is due to start operation between Tokyo and Nagoya in 2034.

JR Central is Japan's most profitable and highest throughput high-speed rail operator, carrying 138 million high-speed-rail passengers in 2009, considerably more than the world's largest airline. Japan recorded a total of 289 million high-speed-rail passengers in 2009.

JR Central is listed in the Tokyo Stock Exchange and Nagoya Stock Exchange with American depositary receipts traded over-the-counter through OTCMG Pink, is a constituent of the TOPIX Core30 index, and is also one of only three Japan Railways Group constituents of the Nikkei 225 index, the others being JR East and JR West. It is one of Nagoya's gosanke companies along with Toyota and the Chubu Electric Power Company.

== Popular culture ==
JR Central runs its "Xmas Express" commercials around Christmas. New ads are shot every year with different actors and often at different stations, all showing a couple reuniting in time for the holidays thanks to the Tokaido Shinkansen's reliability and punctuality, usually with the boyfriend disembarking from a Shinkansen with the girlfriend preparing to surprise him. All of these commercials are set to Tatsuro Yamashita's "Christmas Eve", which was selected from a pool of 300 songs to serve as the theme song.

== Lines ==
=== Shinkansen ===
- Tōkaidō Shinkansen: Tokyo–Ōsaka 552.6 km (343.4 mi)
- Chūō Shinkansen (maglev): Tokyo–Nagoya (under construction)

=== Conventional lines ===
- Tōkaidō Main Line: Atami–Maibara 341.3 km (212.1 mi)
  - Branch line: Ōgaki–Mino-Akasaka 5.0 km (3.1 mi)
- Gotemba Line: Kōzu–Numazu 60.2 km (37.4 mi)
- Minobu Line: Fuji–Kōfu 88.4 km (54.9 mi)
- Iida Line: Toyohashi–Tatsuno 195.7 km (121.6 mi)
- Taketoyo Line: Ōbu–Taketoyo 19.3 km (12.0 mi)
- Chūō Main Line: Shiojiri–Nagoya 174.8 km (108.6 mi)
- Takayama Main Line: Gifu–Inotani 189.2 km (117.6 mi)
- Taita Line: Tajimi–Mino-Ōta 17.8 km (11.1 mi)
- Kansai Main Line: Nagoya–Kameyama 59.9 km (37.2 mi)
- Kisei Main Line: Kameyama–Shingū 180.2 km (112.0 mi)
- Meishō Line: Matsusaka–Ise-Okitsu 43.5 km (27.0 mi)
- Sangū Line: Taki–Toba 29.1 km (18.1 mi)
- Jōhoku Line: Kachigawa–Biwajima 11.2 km (7.0 mi) (trains operated by subsidiary JR Central Transport Service Company)

== Named train services ==
- Fujikawa (Shizuoka–Kōfu)
- Hida (Nagoya/Ōsaka–Takayama, Hida-Furukawa & Toyama)
- Hikari (Tokyo–Hakata & Hakataminami)
- Inaji (Toyohashi–Iida)
- Kodama (Tokyo–Shin-Ōsaka, Shin-Ōsaka–Hakata & Hakataminami)
- Mie (Nagoya–Iseshi & Toba)
- Nanki (Nagoya–Shingū & Kii-Katsuura)
- Nozomi (Tokyo–Hakata)
- Odoriko (Tokyo–Izukyū-Shimoda & Shuzenji)
- Shinano (Nagoya–Nagano & Hakuba)
- Sunrise Izumo (Tokyo–Izumoshi)
- Sunrise Seto (Tokyo–Takamatsu)

== Affiliates ==
The JR Central Group consists of JR Central and the following affiliates:

=== Transportation ===
- JR Tokai Bus Company
- JR Tokai Logistics Company (ja:ジェイアール東海物流株式会社)
- JR Central Transport Service Company
- First Air Transport Co., Ltd. (ja:ファーストエアートランスポート株式会社)

=== Merchandise ===
- JR Tokai Corporation (ja:ジェイアール東海商事株式会社)
- JR Tokai Takashimaya Co., Ltd. (株式会社ja:ジェイアール東海高島屋)
- JR-Central Passengers Co., Ltd. (株式会社ja:ジェイアール東海パッセンジャーズ)
- JR Tokai Food Service Co., Ltd. (ja:ジェイアール東海フードサービス株式会社)
- Tokai Kiosk Company (ja:東海キヨスク株式会社)

=== Construction ===
- JR Tokai Construction Co., Ltd. (ja:ジェイアール東海建設株式会社)
- JR Central Consultants Company (ja:ジェイアール東海コンサルタンツ株式会社)
- The Nihon Kikai Hosen Co., Ltd (ja:日本機械保線株式会社)
- Futaba Tetsudo Kogyo Co., Ltd. (ja:双葉鉄道工業株式会社)
- CN Construction Co., Ltd. (ja:シーエヌ建設株式会社)

=== Information systems ===
- JR Tokai Information Systems Company (ja:ジェイアール東海情報システム株式会社)
- Shinsei Technos Co., Ltd.(ja:新生テクノス株式会社)

=== Hotels and resorts ===
- JR Tokai Hotels Co., Ltd. (株式会社ja:ジェイアール東海ホテルズ)
- Nagoya Terminal Hotel Co., Ltd. (ja:名古屋ターミナルホテル株式会社)
- Shizuoka Terminal Hotel Co., Ltd. (ja:静岡ターミナルホテル株式会社)

=== Travel ===
- JR Tokai Agency Co., Ltd. (株式会社ja:ジェイアール東海エージェンシー)
- JR Tokai Tours (株式会社ja:ジェイアール東海ツアーズ)
- Hida Forest City Planning Co., Ltd. (ja:飛騨森林都市企画株式会社)

=== Publishing ===
- Wedge Inc. (株式会社ウェッジ)

=== Rolling stock ===
- Shinkansen Engineering Co., Ltd. (ja:新幹線エンジニアリング株式会社)
- Tokai Rolling Stock & Machinery Co., Ltd. (ja:東海交通機械株式会社)
- Nippon Sharyo, Ltd

=== Maintenance ===
- Chuoh Linen Supply Co., Ltd. (ja:中央リネンサプライ株式会社)
- JR Tokai General Building Maintenance Co., Ltd. (ja:ジェイアール東海総合ビルメンテナンス株式会社)
- Central Maintenance Co., Ltd. (ja:セントラルメンテナンス株式会社)
- Shinkansen Service & Technology Co., Ltd. (株式会社ja:関西新幹線サービック)
- Shinkansen Maintenance Tokai Co., Ltd. (ja:新幹線メンテナンス東海株式会社)
- Tokai Seibi Co., Ltd. (ja:東海整備株式会社)

=== Real estate ===
- JR Central Building Co., Ltd. (ja:ジェイアールセントラルビル株式会社)
- JR Development and Management Corporation of Kansai (ja:ジェイアール東海関西開発株式会社)
- JR Development and Management Corporation of Shizuoka (ja:ジェイアール東海静岡開発株式会社)
- JR Tokai Real Estate Co., Ltd. (ja:ジェイアール東海不動産株式会社)
- Shizuoka Terminal Development Co., Ltd. (ja:静岡ターミナル開発株式会社)
- Shin-Yokohama Station Development Co., Ltd. (ja:新横浜ステーション開発株株式会社)
- Tokyo Station Development Co., Ltd. (ja:東京ステーション開発株式会社)
- Toyohashi Station Building Co., Ltd. (ja:豊橋ステーションビル株式会社)
- Nagoya Station Area Development Corporation (ja:名古屋ステーション開発株式会社)
- Nagoya Terminal Station Building Co., Ltd. (ja:名古屋ターミナルビル株式会社)
- Hamamatsu Terminal Development Co., Ltd. (ja:浜松ターミナル開発株式会社)

=== Other services ===
- JR Tokai Well Co., Ltd. (株式会社ja:ジェイアール東海ウェル)
- JR Tokai Partners Co., Ltd. (ja:ジェイアール東海パートナーズ株式会社)

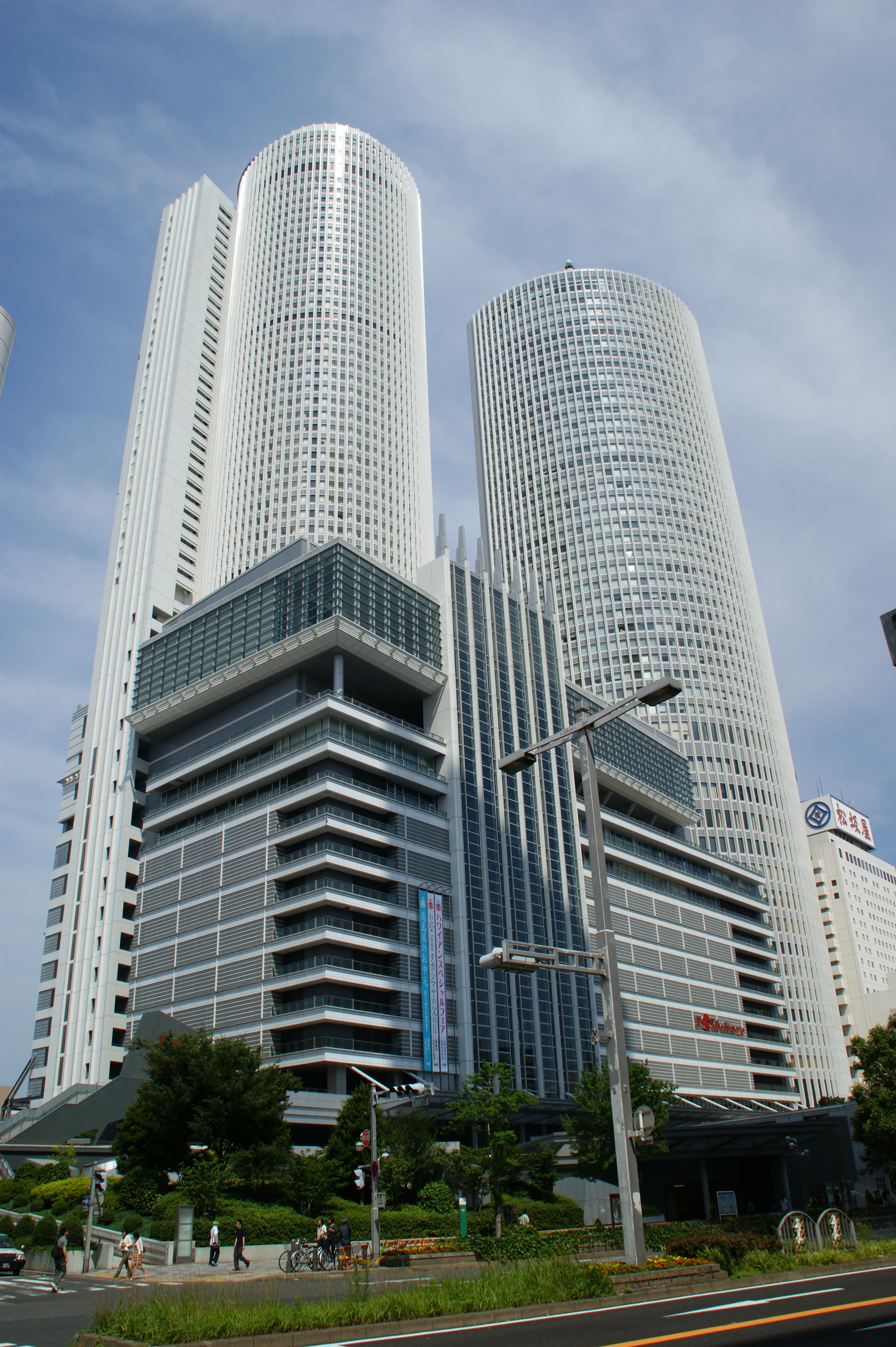
JR Central Towers in Nakamura-ku, Nagoya, the world's largest train station complex by floor area
