= Ise-Ueno Station =

Railway station in Tsu, Mie Prefecture, Japan

Coordinates: 34°48′1.7″N 136°32′32.75″E

Ise-Ueno Station 伊勢上野駅
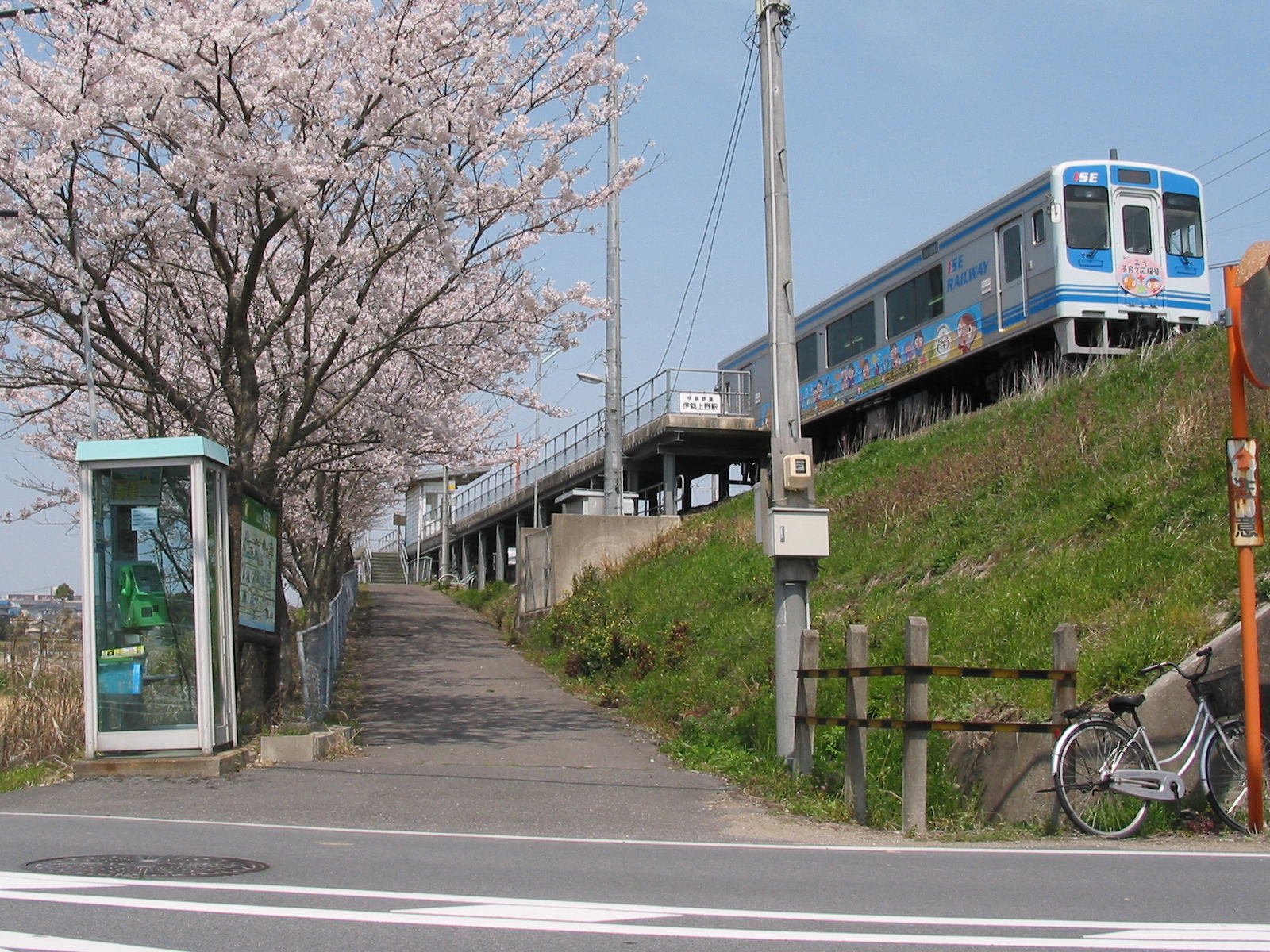
- Ise-Ueno Station

General information
- Location: Kawage-cho Ueno, Tsu, Mie （三重県津市河芸町） Japan
- Operator: Ise Railway
- Line: Ise Line

Other information
- Station code: 9

History
- Opened: 1987

Passengers
- FY2010: 42 daily
Location

Ise-Ueno Station (伊勢上野駅, Ise-Ueno-eki) is a railway station in Tsu, Mie Prefecture, Japan, operated by Ise Railway. The station is 14.0 rail kilometers from the terminus of the line at Kawarada Station.

== History ==
Ise-Ueno Station opened on March 27, 1987.

== Lines ==
- Ise Railway
  - Ise Line

== Station layout ==
Ise-Ueno Station has a single side platform serving bi-directional traffic. The station is unattended.

=== Platforms ===
1	■ Ise Railway Ise Line	For Suzuka, Yokkaichi; For Tsu

== Adjacent stations ==
«	Service	»
Ise Railway
Ise Line (9)
Limited Express "Nanki": Does not stop at this station
Rapid "Mie": Does not stop at this station
Nakaseko (8)	Local	Kawage (10)
