= Kawage Station =

Railway station in Tsu, Mie Prefecture, Japan

Coordinates: 34°46′52.9″N 136°31′52.25″E

Kawage Station (河芸駅, Kawage-eki)

== History ==
Kawage Station opened on September 1, 1973 as a station on the Japan National Railways (JNR) Ise Line. The Ise Line was privatized on March 27, 1987, four days before the dissolution of the JNR on April 1, 1987.

== Lines ==
- Ise Railway
  - Ise Line

== Station layout ==
Kawage Station consists of two opposed side platforms connected by a level crossing. The station is unattended.

=== Platforms ===
1	■ Ise Railway Ise Line	for Suzuka, and Yokkaichi
2	■ Ise Railway Ise Line	for Tsu

== Adjacent stations ==
«	Service	»
Ise Railway
Ise Line (10)
Limited Express "Nanki": Does not stop at this station
Rapid "Mie": Does not stop at this station
Ise-Ueno (9)	Local	Higashi-Ishinden (11)
