= Tokuda Station (Mie) =

Railway station in Suzuka, Mie Prefecture, Japan

Coordinates: 34°49′33.4″N 136°32′38.4″E

Tokuda Station 徳田駅
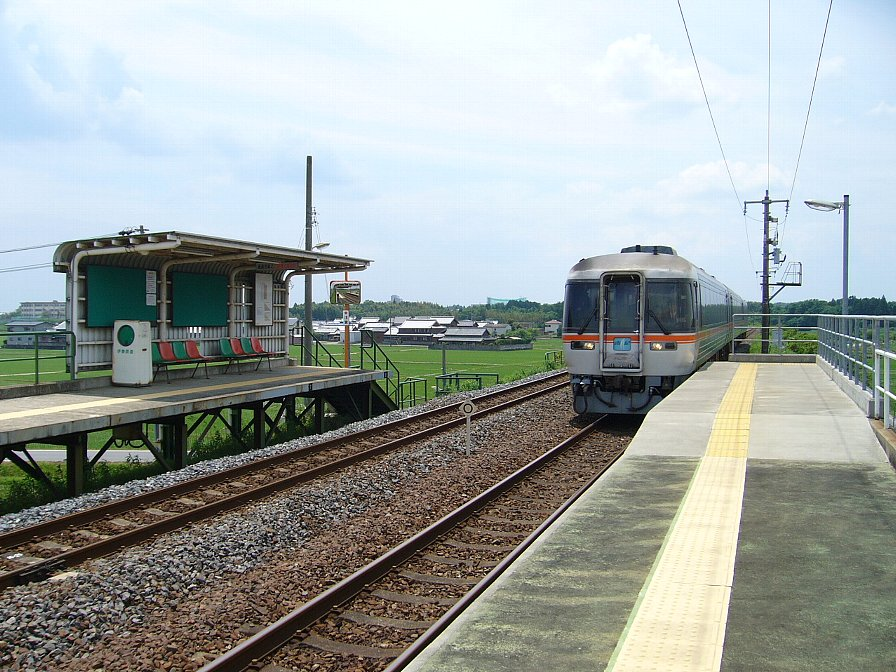
- Tokuda Station

General information
- Location: Tokuda-cho, Suzuka, Mie （三重県鈴鹿市徳田町） Japan
- Operator: Ise Railway
- Line: Ise Line

Other information
- Station code: 7

History
- Opened: 16 March 1991

Passengers
- FY2010: 39 daily
Location

Tokuda Station (徳田駅, Tokuda-eki) is a railway station in Suzuka, Mie Prefecture, Japan, operated by Ise Railway. The station is 11.1 rail kilometers from the terminus of the line at Kawarada Station.

== History ==
Tokuda Station opened on March 16, 1991.

== Lines ==
- Ise Railway
  - Ise Line

== Station layout ==
Tokuda Station has a two opposed side platforms. The station is unattended.

=== Platforms ===
1	■ Ise Railway Ise Line	for Suzuka, and Yokkaichi
2	■ Ise Railway Ise Line	for Tsu

== Adjacent stations ==
«	Service	»
Ise Railway
Ise Line (7)
Limited Express "Nanki": Does not stop at this station
Rapid "Mie": Does not stop at this station
Suzuka Circuit Inō (6)	Local	Nakaseko (8)
