= Higashi-Ishinden Station =

Railway station in Tsu, Mie Prefecture, Japan

Coordinates: 34°45′30.95″N 136°30′43.6″E

Higashi-Ishinden Station 東一身田駅
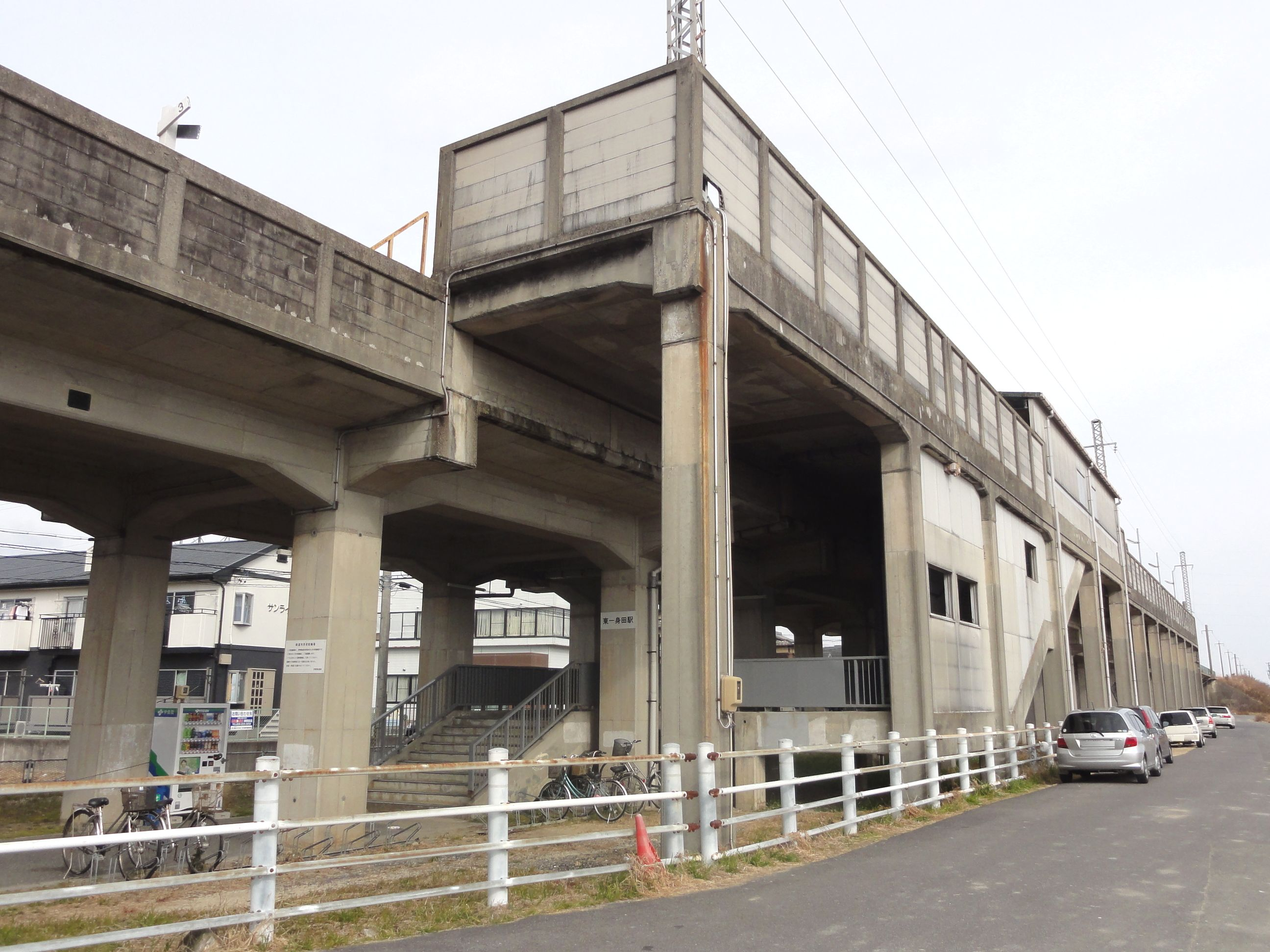
- Higashi-Ishinden Station

General information
- Location: Ishhinden-Hirano, Tsu, Mie （三重県津市一身田平野） Japan
- Operator: Ise Railway
- Line: Ise Line

Other information
- Station code: 11

History
- Opened: 1973

Passengers
- FY2010: 67 daily
Location

Higashi-Ishinden Station (東一身田駅, Higashi-Ishinden-eki) is a railway station in Tsu, Mie Prefecture, Japan, operated by Ise Railway. The station is 19.4 rail kilometers from the terminus of the line at Kawarada Station.

== History ==
Higashi-Ishinden Station opened in 1973 as a station on the Japan National Railways (JNR) Ise Line.

== Lines ==
- Ise Railway
  - Ise Line

== Station layout ==
Higashi-Ishinden Station consists of a single elevated side platform serving bi-directional traffic. The station is unattended.

=== Platforms ===
1	■ Ise Railway Ise Line	For Suzuka, Yokkaichi; For Tsu

== Adjacent stations ==
«	Service	»
Ise Railway
Ise Line (11)
Limited Express "Nanki": Does not stop at this station
Rapid "Mie": Does not stop at this station
Kawage (10)	Local	Tsu (12)
