= Suzuka Circuit Inō Station =

Railway station in Suzuka, Mie Prefecture, Japan

Coordinates: 34°50′27.7″N 136°33′18.1″E

Suzuka Circuit Inō Station 鈴鹿サーキット稲生駅
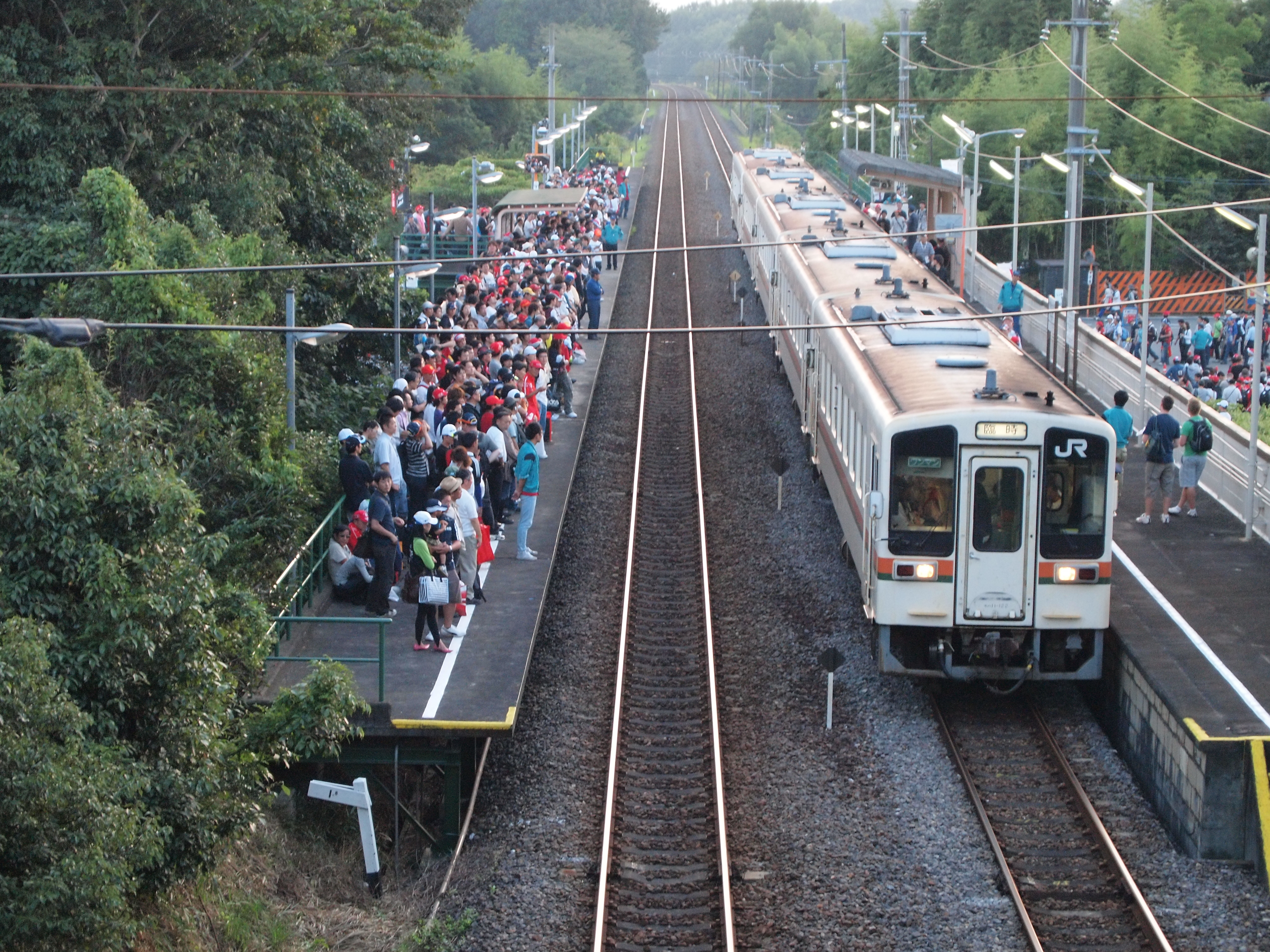
- Suzuka Circuit Inō Station (after 2009 Formula 1 Japanese GP)

General information
- Location: Ino-nishi 3 chome, Suzuka, Mie （三重県鈴鹿市稲生西三丁目） Japan
- Operator: Ise Railway
- Line: Ise Line

Other information
- Station code: 6

History
- Opened: 1973
- Former names: Inō (until 1987)

Passengers
- FY2010: 178 daily
Location

Suzuka Circuit Inō Station (鈴鹿サーキット稲生駅, Suzuka Sākitto Inō-eki) is a railway station in Suzuka, Mie Prefecture, Japan, operated by Ise Railway. The station is 9.1 rail kilometers from the terminus of the line at Kawarada Station. As its name suggests, it is the nearest station to Suzuka Circuit, located 25 minutes away from the station on foot.

== History ==
Suzuka Circuit Inō Station opened on September 1, 1973 as Inō Station (稲生駅, Inō eki) on the Japan National Railways (JNR) Ise Line. The Ise Line was privatized on March 27, 1987 and the name changed to the present name, four days before the dissolution of the JNR on April 1, 1987.

== Line ==
- Ise Railway
  - Ise Line

== Station layout ==
Suzuka Circuit Inō Station has a two opposed side platforms. The station is unattended except on race dates of the Suzuka Circuit.

=== Platforms ===
1	■ Ise Railway Ise Line	for Suzuka, Yokkaichi, Kuwana and Nagoya
2	■ Ise Railway Ise Line	for Tsu, Taki, Iseshi, Toba, Shingu and Kii-Katsuura

== Adjacent stations ==
«	Service	»
Ise Railway
Ise Line (6)
Tamagaki (5)	Local	Tokuda (7)
Suzuka (4)	Rapid Mie (racing days at Suzuka Circuit)	Nakaseko (8, only "Mie" 4 and 6 for Nagoya); Tsu (12)
Suzuka (4)	Limited Express Nanki (Formula 1 Japanese GP at Suzuka Circuit)	Tsu (12)
