= Nakaseko Station =

Railway station in Suzuka, Mie Prefecture, Japan

Coordinates: 34°48′44.9″N 136°32′34.8″E

Nakaseko Station 中瀬古駅
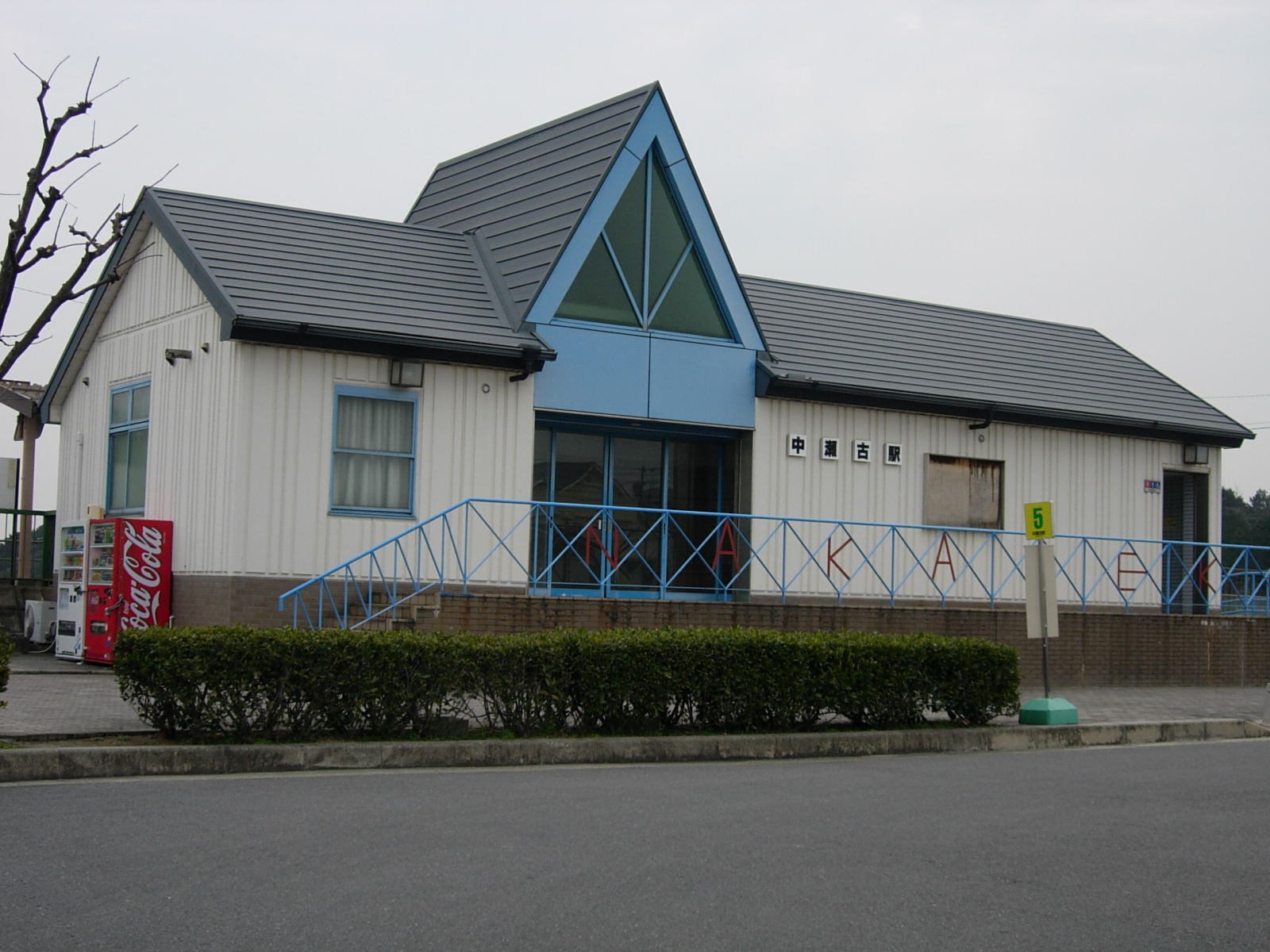
- Nakaseko Station

General information
- Location: Nakaseko-cho, Suzuka, Mie （三重県鈴鹿市中瀬古町） Japan
- Operator: Ise Railway
- Line: Ise Line

Other information
- Station code: 8

History
- Opened: 1973

Passengers
- FY2010: 169 daily
Location

Nakaseko Station (中瀬古駅, Nakaseko-eki) is a railway station in Suzuka, Mie Prefecture, Japan, operated by Ise Railway. The station is 12.7 rail kilometers from the terminus of the line at Kawarada Station.

== History ==
Nakaseko Station opened on September 1, 1973 as a station on the Japan National Railways (JNR) Ise Line. The Ise Line was privatized on March 27, 1987, four days before the dissolution of the JNR on April 1, 1987.

== Lines ==
- Ise Railway
  - Ise Line

== Station layout ==
Nakaseko Station has a two opposed side platforms. The station is unattended.

=== Platforms ===
1	■ Ise Railway Ise Line	for Suzuka, Yokkaichi, Kuwana and Nagoya
2	■ Ise Railway Ise Line	for Tsu, Matsusaka, Iseshi and Toba

== Adjacent stations ==
«	Service	»
Ise Railway
Ise Line (8)
Limited Express Nanki: Does not stop at this station
Suzuka Circuit Inō (6, during racing events at Suzuka Circuit); Suzuka (4)	Rapid Mie 4 and 6 for Nagoya	Tsu (12)
Tokuda (7)	Local	Ise-Ueno (9)
