= Minami-Yokkaichi Station =

Railway station in Yokkaichi, Mie Prefecture, Japan

CJ12 Minami-Yokkaichi Station 南四日市駅
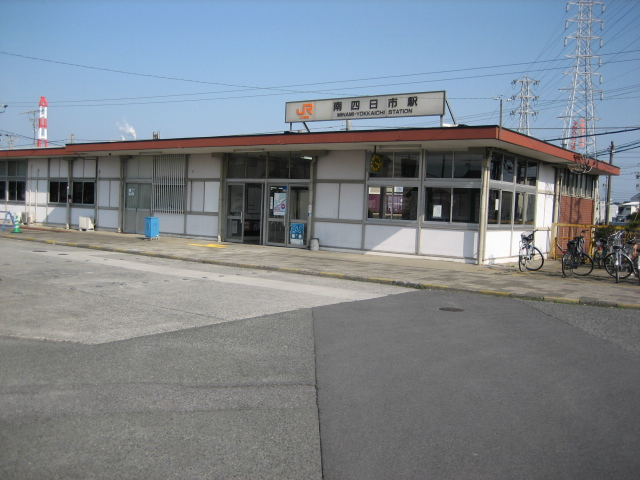
- JR Minami-Yokkaichi Station in 2012

General information
- Location: 3-15 Hinagahigashi-cho, Yokkaichi-shi, Mie-ken 510-0886; Japan
- Coordinates: 34°56′28″N 136°36′31.45″E
- Operator: JR Tōkai; JR Freight
- Line: Kansai Main Line
- Distance: 40.4 km from Nagoya
- Platforms: 1 island platform
- Connections: Bus terminal

History
- Opened: October 1, 1963

Passengers
- FY2019: 715 daily
Location
- Location within Mie Prefecture Location within Japan

Minami-Yokkaichi Station (南四日市駅, Minami-Yokkaichi-eki) is a railway station located in the city of Yokkaichi, Mie Prefecture, Japan, operated by Central Japan Railway Company (JR Tōkai). It also has a freight depot of the Japan Freight Railway Company (JR Freight).

== Lines ==
Minami-Yokkaichi Station is served by the Kansai Main Line, and is 40.4 rail kilometers from the terminus of the line at Nagoya Station. Trains on the Ise Railway Ise Line often stop at this station, although the official terminal station for the line is at Kawarada Station

== Layout ==
The station consists of a single island platform connected to the station building by a level crossing.

=== Platforms ===
1	■ Kansai Main Line	For Yokkaichi, Kuwana and Nagoya
2	■ Kansai Main Line	For Kameyama, Suzuka and Tsu

== Adjacent stations ==
«	Service	»
JR Central
Kansai Main Line
Yokkaichi	Local	Kawarada
Yokkaichi	Semi Rapid	Kawarada
Yokkaichi	Rapid	Kawarada
Rapid "Mie": Does not stop at this station
Limited Express "Nanki": Does not stop at this station

== Station history ==
Minami-Yokkaichi Station began as the Hinaga Signal (日永信号場, Hinaga Shingosho) on July 1, 1928. It was upgraded to a full station on the Kansai Main Line of the Japan National Railways (JNR) on October 1, 1963 and was renamed to its present name at that time. Operations of the Ise Line were extended through Minami-Yokkaichi Station on September 1, 1973. The station was absorbed into the JR Central network upon the privatization of the JNR on April 1, 1987. The station has been unattended since April 1, 2011.

Scheduled freight operations began from September 20, 1934. Containerized freight operations were discontinued on July 1, 1975, but were resumed from September 1, 1993.

Station numbering was introduced to the section of the Kansai Main Line operated JR Central in March 2018; Minami-Yokkaichi Station was assigned station number CI12.

== Passenger statistics ==
In fiscal 2019, the station was used by an average of 715 passengers daily (boarding passengers only).

== Surrounding area ==
- Mie Prefectural Yokkaichi Technical High School
- Kaisei High School
- Ohashi Gakuen High School

== See also ==
- List of railway stations in Japan
