= Tamagaki (disambiguation) =

A Tamagaki is a fence surrounding a Japanese Shinto shrine.

Tamagaki may also refer to:

- Tamagaki Station, a railway station in Suzuka, Mie, Japan
- Tamagaki Gakunosuke (1784 – 1824), a Japanese sumo wrestler
- Tamagaki Oyakata (born 1964), a Japanese sumo wrestler and coach
