= Takachaya Station =

Railway station in Tsu, Mie Prefecture, Japan

Takachaya Station 高茶屋駅
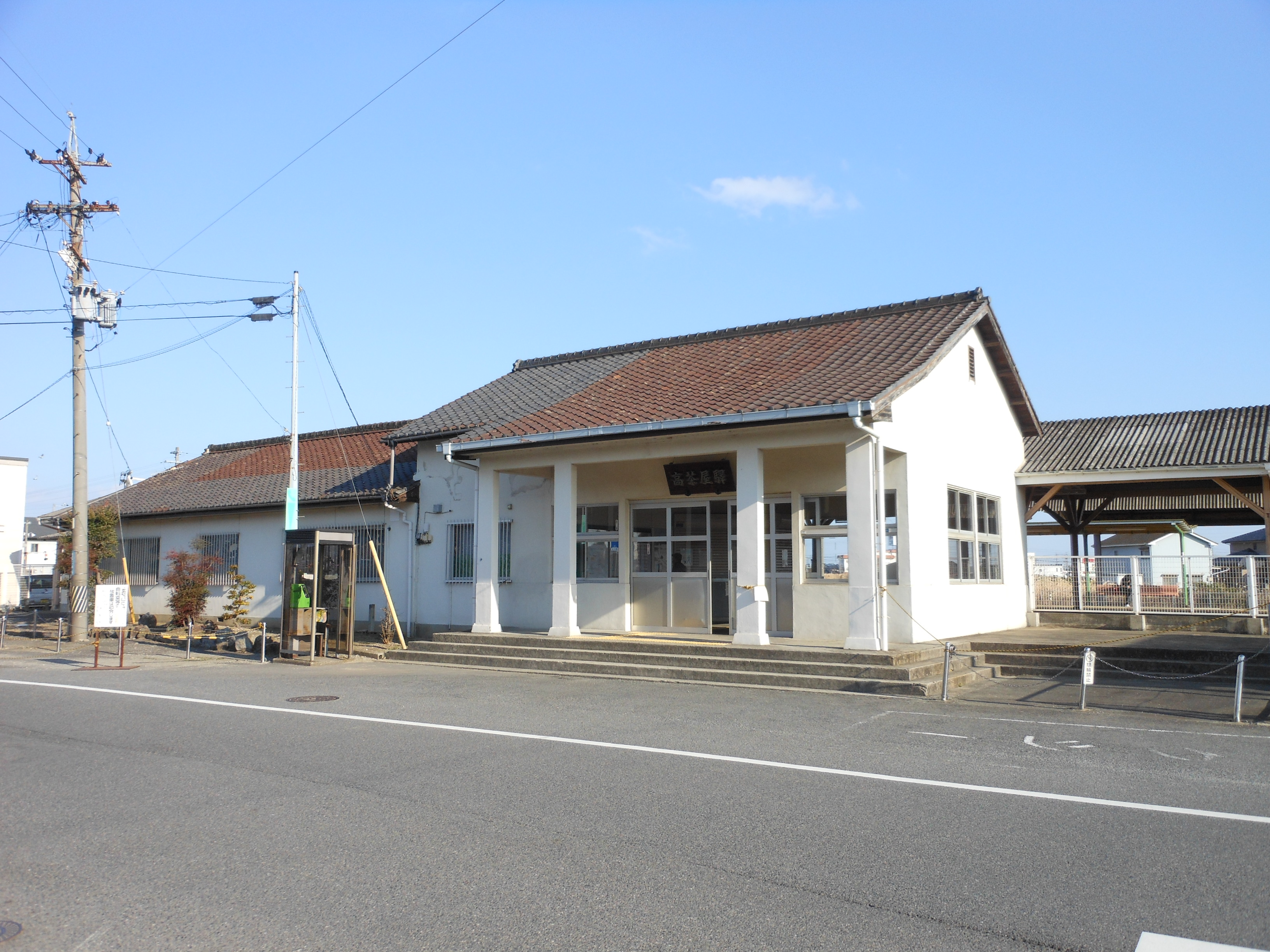
- Takachaya Station

General information
- Location: 1-6-14 Takajaya, Tsu-shi, Mie-ken 514-0819; Japan
- Coordinates: 34°40′2.63″N 136°30′45.00″E
- Operator: JR Tōkai
- Line: ■ Kisei Main Line
- Distance: 23.4 km from Kameyama
- Platforms: 1 island + 1 side platform
- Connections: Bus terminal

History
- Opened: December 31, 1893

Passengers
- FY2019: 551 daily
Location
- Location within Mie Prefecture Location within Japan

Takachaya Station (高茶屋駅, Takachaya-eki) is a passenger railway station in located in the city of Tsu, Mie Prefecture, Japan, operated by Central Japan Railway Company (JR Tōkai).

== Lines ==
Takachaya Station is served by the Kisei Main Line, and is 23.4 rail kilometers from the terminus of the line at Kameyama Station.

== Station layout ==
The station consists of a single side platform and a single island platform connected by a footbridge. The station building, with its high ceiling, dates from the original construction of the line.

=== Platforms ===
1	■ Kisei Main Line	For Kameyama, Yokkaichi, Kuwana, Nagoya
2,3	■ Kisei Main Line	For Matsusaka, Iseshi, Toba, Shingu

== Adjacent stations ==
«	Service	»
Central Japan Railway Company (JR Central)
Kisei Main Line
Rapid "Mie": Does not stop at this station
Limited Express "Nanki": Does not stop at this station
Akogi	Local	Rokken

== History ==
The Sangū Railway started service with its initial line between Tsu Station and Miyagawa Station on December 31, 1893. The line was nationalized on October 1, 1907, becoming the Sangu Line of the Japanese Government Railways (JGR) on October 12, 1909. The station was transferred to the control of the Japan National Railways (JNR) Kisei Main Line on July 15, 1959. The station was absorbed into the JR Central network upon the privatization of the JNR on April 1, 1987. The station has been unattended since October 1, 2011.

== Passenger statistics ==
In fiscal 2019, the station was used by an average of 551 passengers daily (boarding passengers only).

== Surrounding area ==
- ÆON MALL Tsuminami
  - ÆON STYLE Tsuminami
- Mie Science and Technology Promotion Center
- Matsusaka Iron Works Co., Ltd.
- Mie Prefectural Tsu Higher Technical School
- Tsu Municipal Southern Suburbs Junior High School
- Tsu Municipal Takachaya Elementary School

== See also ==
- List of railway stations in Japan
