= Tamagaki Station =

Railway station in Suzuka, Mie Prefecture, Japan

Coordinates: 34°51′18.3″N 136°34′12.9″E

Tamagaki Station 玉垣駅
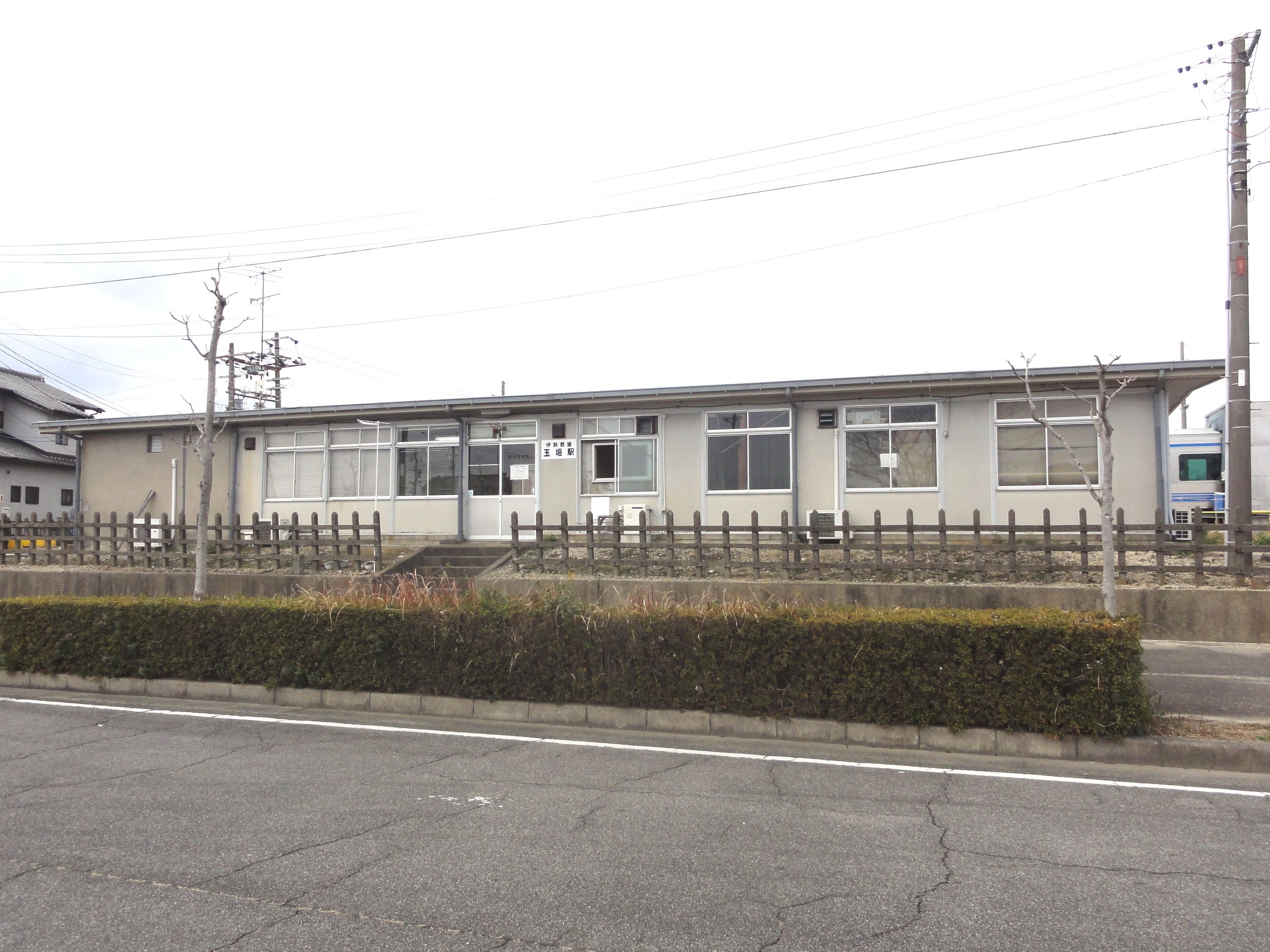
- Tamagaki Station

General information
- Location: 1-20 Sakurajima-cho, Suzuka, Mie （三重県鈴鹿市桜島町一丁目20） Japan
- Operator: Ise Railway
- Line: Ise Line

Other information
- Station code: 5

History
- Opened: 1973

Passengers
- FY2010: 144 daily
Location

Tamagaki Station (玉垣駅, Tamagaki-eki) is a railway station in Suzuka, Mie Prefecture, Japan, operated by Ise Railway. The station is 7.0 rail kilometers from the terminus of the line at Kawarada Station. The Ise Railway head office is located at Tamagaki Station.

== History ==
Tamagaki Station opened on September 1, 1973 as a station on the Japan National Railways (JNR) Ise Line. The Ise Line was privatized on March 27, 1987, four days before the dissolution of the JNR on April 1, 1987.

== Lines ==
- Ise Railway
  - Ise Line

== Station layout ==
Tamagaki Station has one island platform. The station is unattended.

=== Platforms ===
1	■ Ise Railway Ise Line	for Suzuka and Yokkaichi
2	■ Ise Railway Ise Line	for Tsu

== Adjacent stations ==
«	Service	»
Ise Railway
Ise Line (5)
Limited Express "Nanki": Does not stop at this station
Rapid "Mie": Does not stop at this station
Suzuka (4) or Terminus	Local	Suzuka Circuit Inō (6)
