= Tokuda Station =

Tokuda Station (徳田駅) is the name of two train stations in Japan:

- Tokuda Station (Ishikawa)
- Tokuda Station (Mie)
