= Shimonoshō Station =

Railway station in Tsu, Mie Prefecture, Japan

Shimonoshō Station 下庄駅
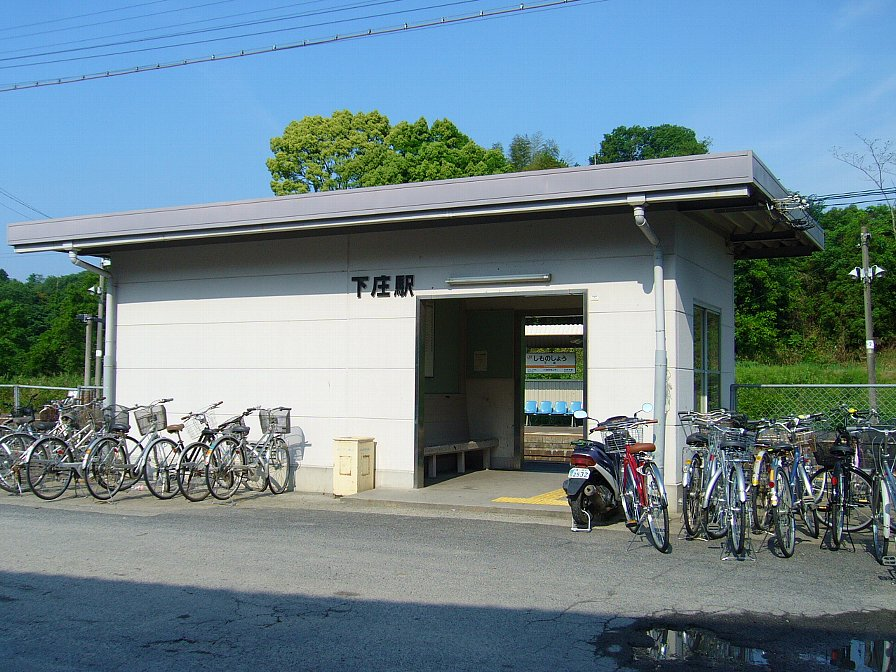
- Shimonoshō Station

General information
- Location: 578 Shimonoshō, Kameyama-shi, Mie-ken 519-0133; Japan
- Coordinates: 34°48′52.45″N 136°28′47.05″E
- Operator: JR Tōkai
- Line: ■ Kisei Main Line
- Distance: 5.5 km from Kameyama
- Platforms: 2 side platforms
- Connections: Bus terminal

History
- Opened: August 21, 1891; 135 years ago

Passengers
- FY2019: 304 daily
Location
- Location within Mie Prefecture Location within Japan

Shimonoshō Station (下庄駅, Shimonoshō-eki) is a passenger railway station in located in the city of Kameyama, Mie Prefecture, Japan, operated by Central Japan Railway Company (JR Tōkai).

== Lines ==
Shimonoshō Station is served by the Kisei Main Line, and is 5.5 rail kilometers from the terminus of the line at Kameyama Station.

== Station layout ==
The station consists of two opposed side platforms connected by a footbridge. There is no station building, but only a small waiting room.

=== Platforms ===
1	■ Kisei Main Line	For Tsu, Iseshi, Toba, Shingu
2	■ Kisei Main Line	For Kameyama

== Adjacent stations ==
«	Service	»
Central Japan Railway Company (JR Central)
Kisei Main Line
Rapid: Does not stop at this station
Kameyama	Local	Ishinden

== History ==
Shimonoshō Station opened on August 21, 1891, as a station on the Tsu spur line of the privately owned Kansai Railway. The line was nationalized on October 1, 1907, and it became the Sangu Line of the Japanese Government Railways (JGR) on October 12, 1909. The station was transferred to the control of the Japan National Railways (JNR) Kisei Main Line on July 15, 1959. The station has been unattended since December 21, 1983. The station was absorbed into the JR Central network upon the privatization of the JNR on April 1, 1987.

== Passenger statistics ==
In fiscal 2019, the station was used by an average of 304 passengers daily (boarding passengers only).

== Surrounding area ==
- Tsu City Toyogaoka Elementary School
- Tsutoyogaoka Post Office

== See also ==
- List of railway stations in Japan
