= Akogi Station =

Railway station in Tsu, Mie Prefecture, Japan

Akogi Station 阿漕駅
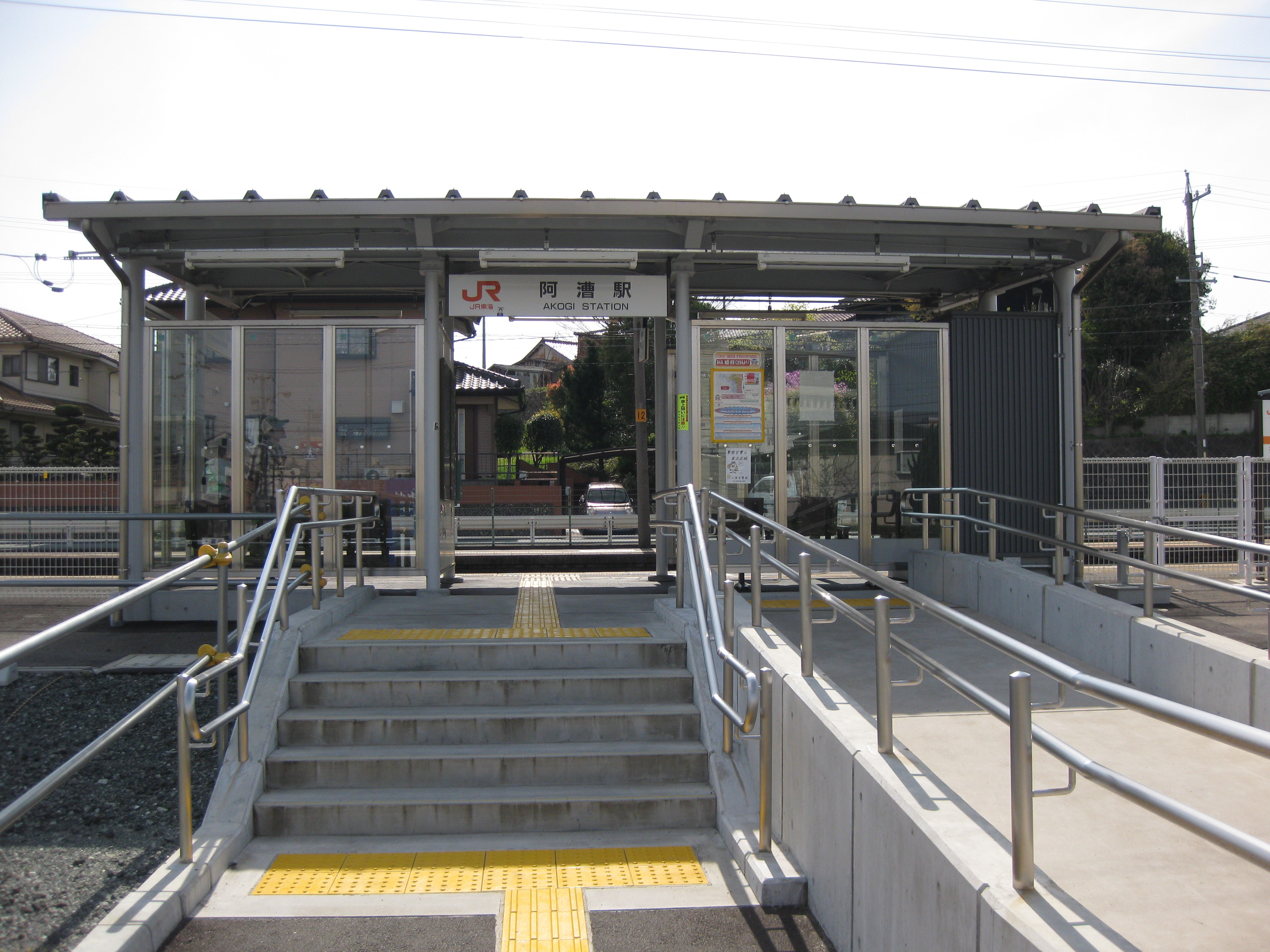
- Akogi Station entrance in April 2016

General information
- Location: 20-24 Okura, Tsu-shi, Mie-ken 514-0833; Japan
- Coordinates: 34°42′13″N 136°30′15.7″E
- Operator: JR Tōkai
- Line: ■ Kisei Main Line
- Distance: 19.3 km from Kameyama
- Platforms: 1 island + 1 side platform
- Connections: Bus terminal

History
- Opened: December 31, 1893

Passengers
- FY2019: 344 daily
Location
- Location within Mie Prefecture Location within Japan

Akogi Station (阿漕駅, Akogi-eki) is a passenger railway station in located in the city of Tsu, Mie Prefecture, Japan, operated by Central Japan Railway Company (JR Tōkai).

== Lines ==
Akogi Station is served by the Kisei Main Line, and is 19.3 rail kilometers from the terminus of the line at Kameyama Station.

== Station layout ==
The station consists of a single side platform and a single island platform connected by a footbridge.

=== Platforms ===
| 1 | ■ Kisei Main Line | for Matsusaka, Iseshi, Toba, Shingu |
| 2,3 | ■ Kisei Main Line | for Kameyama, Yokkaichi, Kuwana, Nagoya |

== Adjacent stations ==
| « | Service | » |
Kisei Main Line
Rapid "Mie": Does not stop at this station
Limited Express "Nanki": Does not stop at this station
| Tsu | Local | Takachaya |

== History ==
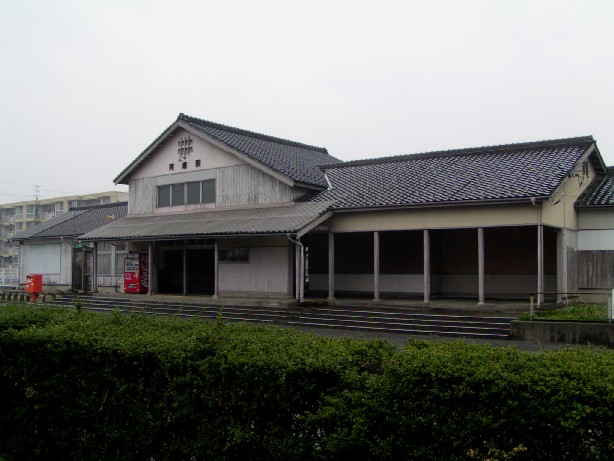
The station building in 2005

The Sangū Railway started operating between Tsu Station and Miyagawa Station on December 31, 1893. The line was nationalized on October 1, 1907, becoming the Sangu Line of the Japanese Government Railways (JGR) on October 12, 1909. The station was transferred to the control of the Japanese National Railways (JNR) Kisei Main Line on July 15, 1959. The station has been unattended since December 21, 1983. The station was absorbed into the JR Central network upon the privatization of JNR on April 1, 1987.

== Passenger statistics ==
In fiscal 2019, the station was used by an average of 344 passengers daily (boarding passengers only).

== Surrounding area ==
- Tsukyujo Park
- Maruyama Inari Shrine
- Tsuhashi Minami Post Office
- Mie Prefectural Tsu Technical High School
- Mie Prefectural Mie Yume Gakuen High School

== See also ==
- List of railway stations in Japan
