= Kawano Station =

Railway station in Suzuka, Mie Prefecture, Japan

CJ14 Kawano Station 河曲駅
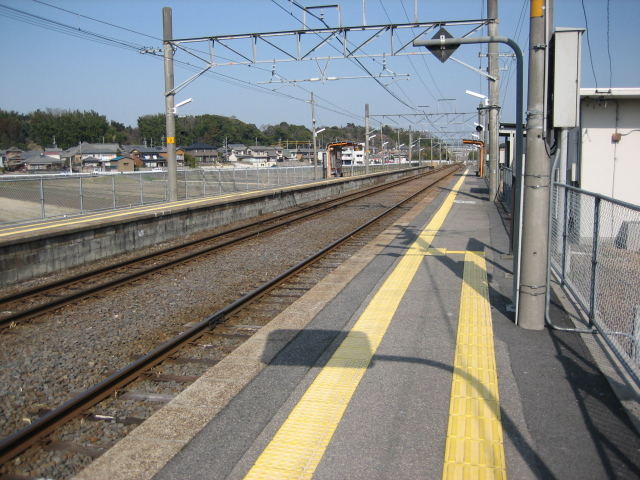
- JR Kawano Station in 2012

General information
- Location: 718 Kida-cho, Suzuka-shi, Mie-ken 513-0015; Japan
- Coordinates: 34°53′52.31″N 136°34′5.3″E
- Operator: JR Tōkai
- Line: Kansai Main Line
- Distance: 47.5 km from Nagoya
- Platforms: 2 side platforms
- Connections: Bus terminal

History
- Opened: March 1, 1949
- Former names: Suzuka (until 1973)

Passengers
- FY2019: 322 daily
Location
- Location within Mie Prefecture Location within Japan

Kawano Station (河曲駅, Kawano-eki) is a passenger railway station located in the city of Suzuka, Mie Prefecture, Japan, operated by Central Japan Railway Company (JR Tōkai).

== Lines ==
Kawano Station is served by the Kansai Main Line, and is 47.5 rail kilometers from the terminus of the line at Nagoya Station.

== Station layout ==
The station consists of two opposed side platforms, connected by a level crossing.

=== Platforms ===
1	■ Kansai Main Line	For Yokkaichi, Kuwana, Nagoya
2	■ Kansai Main Line	For Kameyama

== Adjacent stations ==
«	Service	»
Central Japan Railway Company (JR Central)
Kansai Main Line
Kawarada	Local	Kasado
Kawarada	Semi Rapid	Kasado
Kawarada	Rapid	Kasado

== Station history ==
Kawano Station began as the Kida Signal (木田信号場, Kida Shingosho) on July 1, 1928, and was upgraded to a full station on the Kansai Main Line of the Japanese Government Railways (JGR) on March 1, 1949. The JGR became the Japan National Railways (JNR) after World War II. The station was named Suzuka Station (鈴鹿駅, Suzuka eki) at the time, but was renamed to its present name on July 10, 1973. The station has been unattended since February, 1986. The station was absorbed into the JR Central network upon the privatization of the JNR on April 1, 1987.

Station numbering was introduced to the section of the Kansai Main Line operated JR Central in March 2018; Kawano Station was assigned station number CI14.

== Passenger statistics ==
In fiscal 2019, the station was used by an average of 322 passengers daily (boarding passengers only).

== Surrounding area ==
- Suzuka City Kobe Junior High School
- Suzuka City Kawano Elementary School

== See also ==
- List of railway stations in Japan
