= KiHa 85 series =

Japanese diesel multiple unit train type

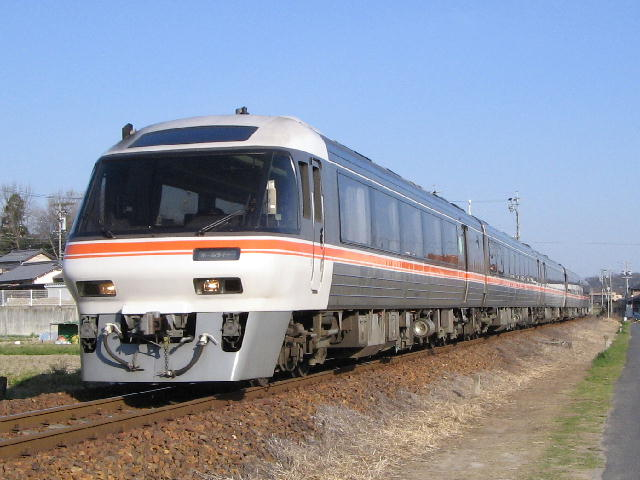
- KiHa 85 series train on the Taita Line in 2008
- In service: 1989 – July 9, 2023
- Manufacturers: Nippon Sharyo, Fuji Heavy Industries, Niigata Tekko
- Replaced: KiHa 80
- Constructed: 1988–1992, 1997
- Entered service: February 18, 1989
- Number built: 81 vehicles
- Number in service: None
- Number scrapped: 1 vehicle (KiHa85-107, accident damage)
- Successor: HC85 series
- Formation: Various
- Operator: JR Central
- Depot: Nagoya
- Lines served: Kansai Main Line, Tōkaidō Main Line, Kisei Main Line, Takayama Main Line, Ise Line

Specifications
- Car body construction: Stainless steel
- Car length: 21,600 mm (70 ft 10 in); 21,300 mm (69 ft 11 in)
- Width: 2,930 mm (9 ft 7 in)
- Height: 4,005 mm (13 ft 1.7 in)
- Doors: One per side
- Maximum speed: 120 km/h (75 mph)
- Prime mover: DMF14HZ
- Power output: 350 hp (260 kW) per motor
- Transmission: Hydraulic
- Bogies: C-DT57
- Safety systems: ATS-PT, ATS-ST
- Coupling system: Shibata
- Track gauge: 1,067 mm (3 ft 6 in)

The KiHa 85 series (キハ85系, KiHa 85-kei) was a diesel multiple unit (DMU) train type operated by Central Japan Railway Company (JR Central) on Hida and Nanki limited express services in Japan from 1989 until 2023.

The "KiHa" designation derives from the classification system used by JNR. "Ki" indicates a diesel-powered vehicle, while "Ha" indicates an ordinary passenger car, as opposed to a green car.

== Technical specifications ==
The trains used stainless steel car bodies, consisted of up to five cars per train set and were powered by DMF14HZ engines. Two types of end cars existed, of which one had a gangway.

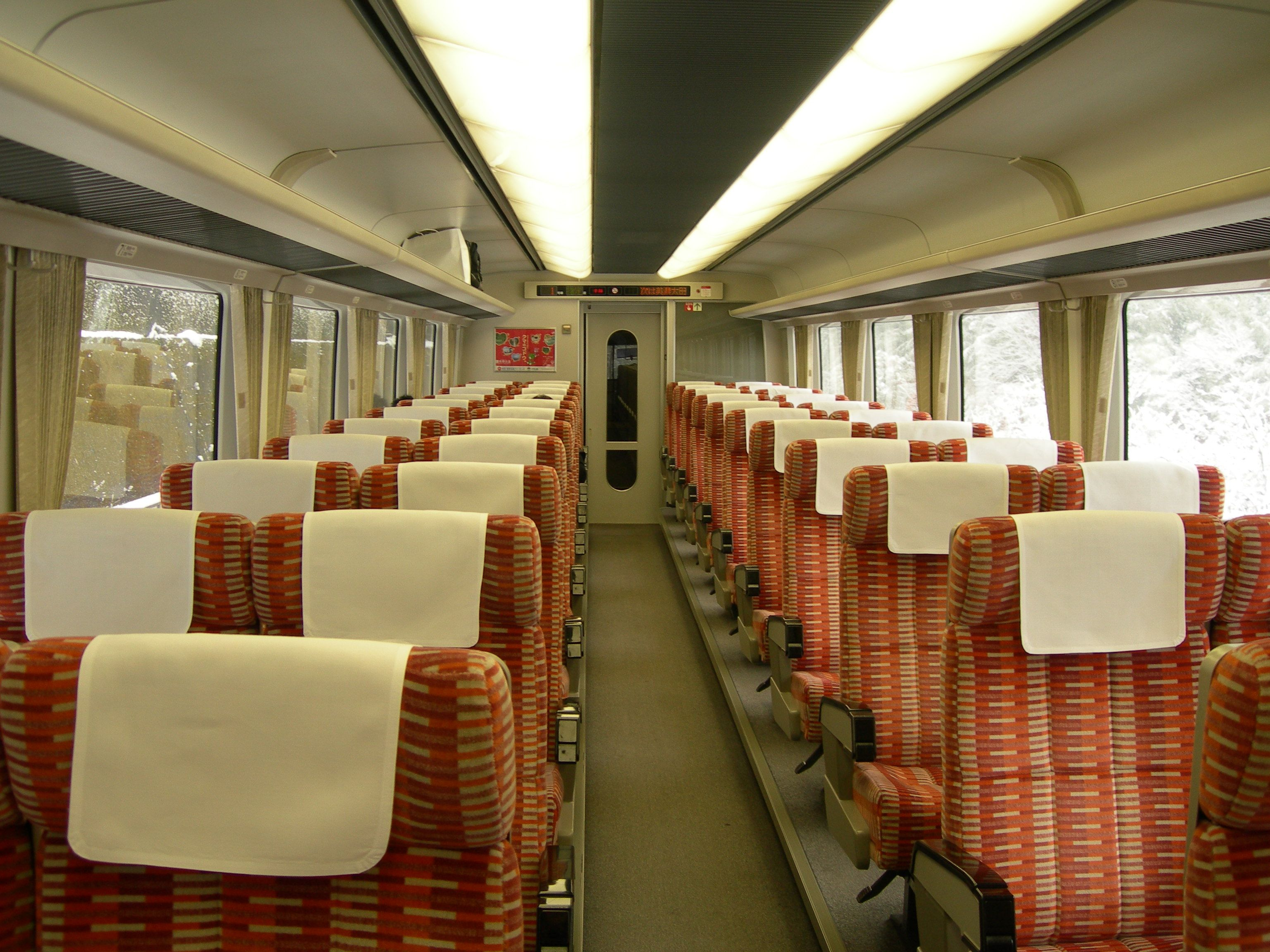
Interior view

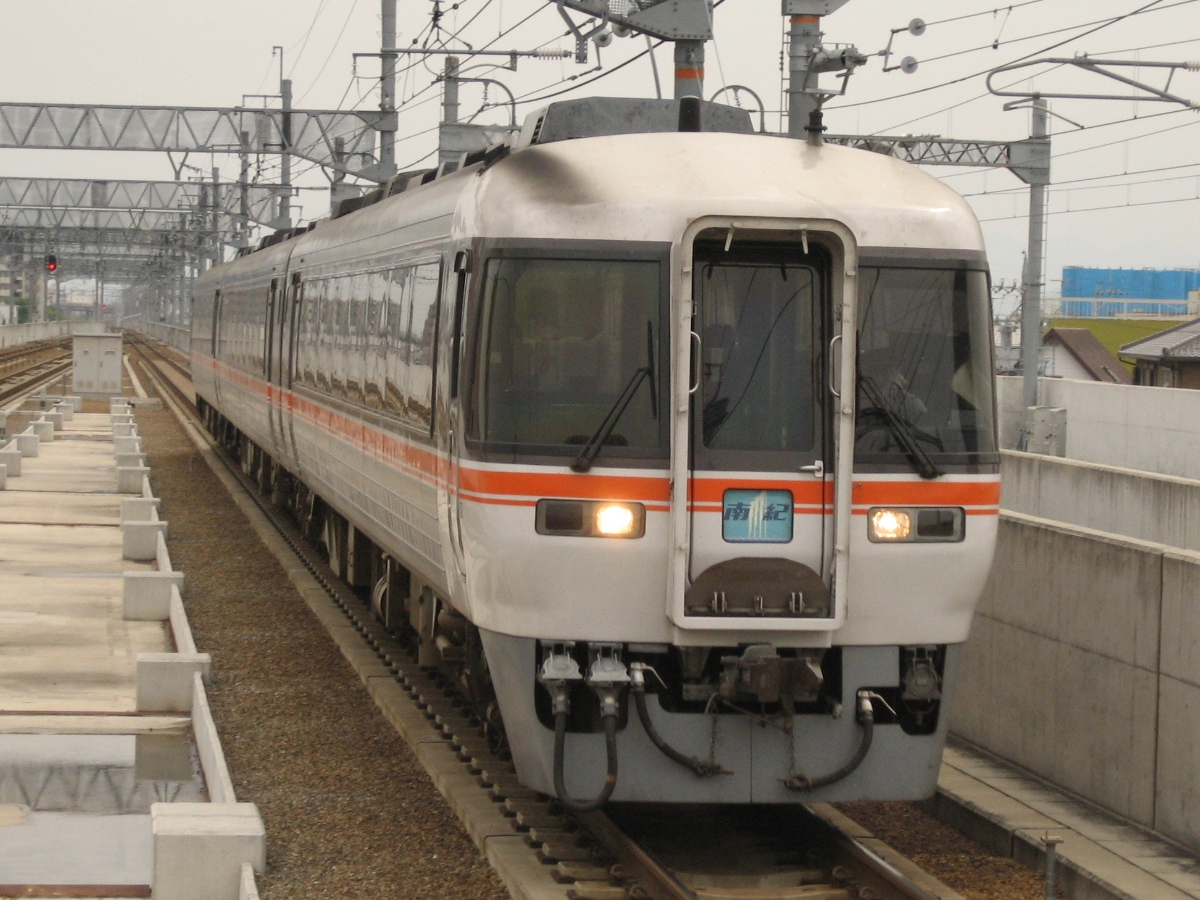
Cab end with gangway

== History ==
The trains entered service on February 18, 1989, and were the first independent train development of JR Central. They were introduced to replace aging ex-JNR DMUs such as the KiHa 80 series and to make the Hida service more attractive to tourists.

JR Central unveiled a fleet of HC85 series hybrid trains, which was developed as a successor to the KiHa 85 series, on December 12, 2019. The KiHa 85 series was withdrawn from Hida services ahead of the operator's timetable revision for March 18, 2023, and from Nanki services on June 30, 2023. JR Central operated commemorative express trains on July 8 and 9, 2023.

=== Resale ===
Four KiHa 85 series cars – KiHa 85-3, 6, 7, and 12 – were transferred to the Kyoto Tango Railway and reclassified as KTR8500 series.
