= Ise Line =

Railway line in Mie Prefecture, Japan

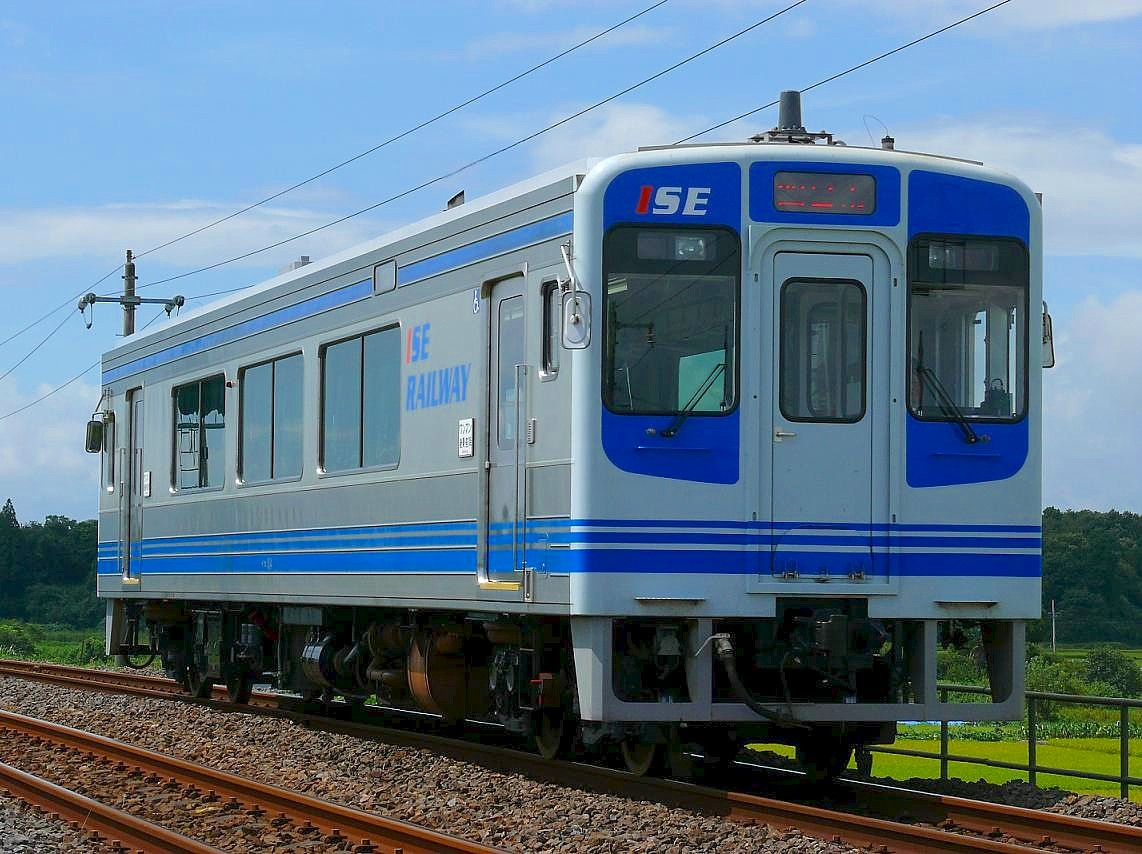
- An Ise Railway type III DMU on the Ise Line

Overview
- Native name: 伊勢線
- Status: In operation
- Owner: Ise Railway
- Locale: Mie Prefecture
- Termini: Kawarada; Tsu
- Stations: 10

Service
- Type: Heavy rail
- Services: 3
- Operator(s): Ise Railway, JR Central
- Depot: Tamagaki
- Rolling stock: Ise Railway type III DMU, KiHa 75 series DMU, HC85 series DEMU

History
- Opened: 1 September 1973; 52 years ago

Technical
- Line length: 22.3 km (13.9 mi)
- Number of tracks: Single (Tsu - Nakaseko); Double (Nakaseko - Kawarada)
- Character: Mainly urban with some rural areas
- Track gauge: 1,067 mm (3 ft 6 in)
- Electrification: None
- Operating speed: 110 km/h (68 mph)

The Ise Line (伊勢線, Ise-sen) is a Japanese railway line in Mie Prefecture which runs between Kawarada Station in Yokkaichi and Tsu Station in Tsu. It is the only railway line of the third-sector operator Ise Railway (伊勢鉄道, Ise Tetsudō), also abbreviated Isetetsu (伊勢鉄). The company took over the former Japanese National Railways line in 1987.

The line was originally built as a shorter route between Nagoya and the Kii Peninsula (Kisei Main Line). As such, the Central Japan Railway Company (JR Central) limited express Nanki and rapid Mie use the line, providing the primary revenue stream for the company. The line also transports spectators when Formula One World Championship Japanese Grand Prix is held at Suzuka Circuit (1987–2006, 2009 onward).

== History ==
The line was opened by Japanese National Railways in 1973 as a shortcut between the Kansai Main Line and the Kisei Line. The entire line was built with future double-tracking and electrification in mind, with necessary equipment installed along the entire line. However, usage was sluggish and the line operated with a deficit due to the initial single track limiting the number of services to 7 round trips for local plus 3 round trips for limited express services daily. On the other hand, the parallel Kintetsu Nagoya Line operated with 44 limited express round trips, 34 express round trips, 9 semi-express round trips, and 62 local round trip services daily.

After the privatization of JNR, the Ise Line was scheduled to be abolished, and since the line ran outside urban areas there was no opposition from the local residents or government. In 1986, it was decided to convert the line to a third-sector railway, and in 1987, the line was transferred to the Ise Railway Co. At the time of conversion, the only train exchange facility was at Tamagaki Station; therefore, it was decided that the section between Kawarada and Nakaseko be double-tracked to increase transport capacity. In 1993, the track between Kawarada and Nakaseko was doubled, which increased the transport capacity to 55 round trips per day. The cost of construction for double-tracking between Kawarada and Nakaseko (12.8 km (8.0 mi)) was 2.05 billion yen; of this, Ise Railway paid 430 million yen, while the rest was paid by the national government, Mie Prefecture, and local governments along the line.

Most passengers pass through on the Rapid Mie and Limited Express Nanki services, but there are increasing commuter passengers due to the opening of Suzuka University near Nakaseko Station. In 1996, the line turned a profit for the first time.

Freight services started operations in 2008, but ceased in 2013.

== Stations ==
All stations are in Mie Prefecture.

Key:

L: Local (普通, Futsū)
R: Rapid "Mie" (快速「みえ」, Kaisoku Mie)
E: Limited Express "Nanki" (特急「南紀」, Tokkyū Nanki)
Lower case letters refer to some trains stopping on days of racing events at Suzuka Circuit.

Number	Station	Japanese	Distance (km)	Stop	Connecting lines	Location
1	Yokkaichi	四日市	6.9	LRE	Kansai Main Line; Kintetsu Nagoya Line (Kintetsu Yokkaichi) with bus connection	Yokkaichi
2	Minami-Yokkaichi	南四日市	3.7	L		Yokkaichi
3	Kawarada	河原田	0.0	L	Kansai Main Line	Yokkaichi
4	Suzuka	鈴鹿	3.8	LRE		Suzuka
5	Tamagaki	玉垣	7.0	L		Suzuka
6	Suzuka Circuit Inō	鈴鹿サーキット稲生	9.1	Lre		Suzuka
7	Tokuda	徳田	11.1	L		Suzuka
8	Nakaseko	中瀬古	12.7	LR		Suzuka
9	Ise-Ueno	伊勢上野	14.0	L		Tsu
10	Kawage	河芸	16.4	L		Tsu
11	Higashi-Ishinden	東一身田	19.4	L		Tsu
12	Tsu	津	22.3	LRE	Kisei Main Line; Kintetsu Nagoya Line	Tsu

== See also ==
- List of railway companies in Japan
- List of railway lines in Japan
