= Nanki (train service) =

Japanese limited express train service

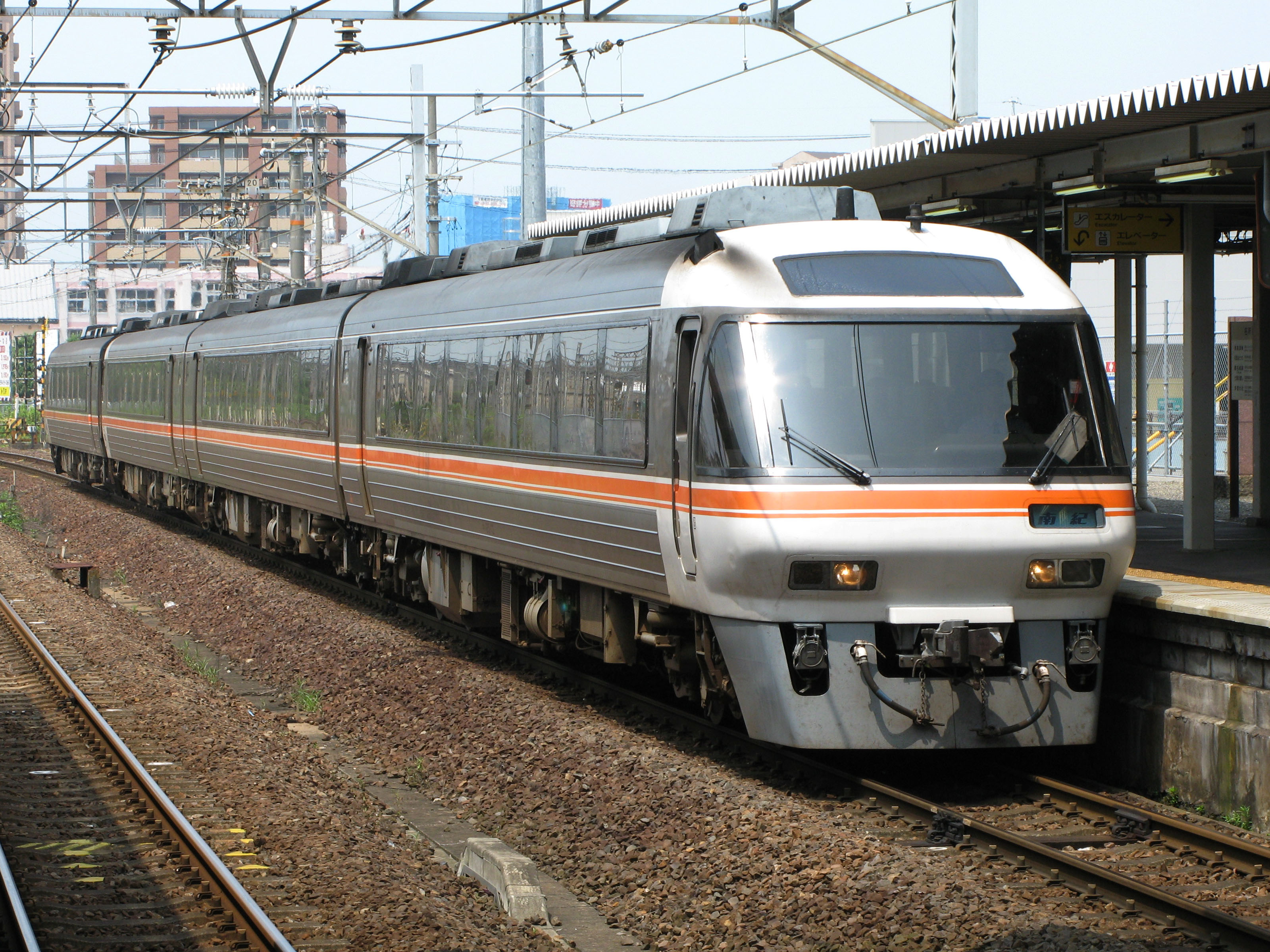
- Nanki at Kuwana Station

Overview
- Service type: Limited express
- Status: Operational
- First service: 2 October 1972
- Current operator: JR Central
- Former operator: JNR

Route
- Termini: Nagoya; Shingu, Kii-Katsuura
- Stops: 13
- Distance travelled: 231.1 km (143.6 mi) (Nagoya - Shingu); 246.0 km (152.9 mi) (Nagoya - Kii-Katsuura)
- Average journey time: 3 hours 30 minutes approx (Nagoya - Shingu); 4 hours approx (Nagoya - Kii-Katsuura)
- Service frequency: 4 return workings daily
- Lines used: Kansai Main Line, Ise Railway Ise Line, Kisei Main Line

On-board services
- Class: Standard only
- Disabled access: Yes
- Sleeping arrangements: None
- Catering facilities: None
- Observation facilities: None
- Entertainment facilities: None
- Other facilities: Toilets, WiFi

Technical
- Rolling stock: HC85 series DEMU
- Electrification: Diesel
- Operating speed: 120 km/h (75 mph)
- Track owners: JR Central, JR West, Ise Railway

The Nanki (南紀) is a limited express train service in Japan operated by Central Japan Railway Company (JR Central), which runs from Nagoya to Shingū and Kii-Katsuura.

The service passes through several notable and important locations, situated on the Kii Peninsula, such as Matsusaka. Travelling the entire 246 km (152.9 mi) journey from Nagoya to Kii-Katsuura takes just under four hours, while the 231.1 km (143.6 mi) section from Nagoya to Shingu takes approximately three and a half hours. As the Nanki is a limited express service, passengers must purchase a limited express ticket on top of the basic fare ticket to use the train.

== History ==
The service was first introduced on 2 October 1972. Until February 18, 1989, the Nanki was operated by KiHa 80 Diesel Multiple Units (DMUs), until their replacement by KiHa 85 DMUs. Nanki services were sometimes called Wide View Nanki because of their large viewing windows that offer uninterrupted views of the track and scenery at the front of the train, as is the case with other JR Central Limited Express services operated with 383 series, 373 series or KiHa 85 series trains. After the introduction of the new HC85 hybrid units, the term Wide View was removed from all services and the train was simply renamed to Nanki.

== Route ==
The train stops at the following stations:

Nagoya - Kuwana - Yokkaichi - Suzuka - (Suzuka Circuit Inō) - Tsu - Matsusaka - Taki - Misedani - Kii-Nagashima - Owase - Kumanoshi - Shingū - Kii-Katsuura

Between Yokkaichi and Tsu, the train runs along the private Ise Railway Ise Line. An additional fee of 520 yen is required for Japan Rail Pass holders to ride the train in this section.

Suzuka Circuit Inō is only served on the day of the annual Formula 1 Grand Prix race at Suzuka Circuit.

From Nagoya to Taki, the train follows the same route and generally the same stopping pattern as the Mie rapid service.

The section of the route between Shingū and Kii-Katsuura is operated by JR West.

== Service ==
There are 4 daily departures in each direction. Of the 4 departures from Nagoya, 3 run the full length to Kii-Katsuura, while the last service of the day terminates at Shingu. 3 services begin at Kii-Katsuura and run to Nagoya. The earliest Nagoya-bound service starts from Shingu. The Nanki is formed of HC85 series diesel-electric multiple units in 2-4 car formations, but sometimes it may operate in 5 or 6 car formations, especially during busy seasons and days of large events, such as the Formula 1 Grand Prix, which is held at Suzuka Circuit every October.

== Facilities ==
Only standard class is available on this service. The Green car (first class) was removed from all services on 1 November 2020, due to declining ridership. Seat reservations can be made for an extra fee. There are toilets, including universal access ones. There are also wheelchair spaces. Onboard catering services ceased on 16 March 2013. Complimentary WiFi is available.

== Plans ==
In September 2020, JR Central announced that as a result of declining ridership in the past 3 years, due to development of the Kisei Highway, changes will be made to the car formations. On 1 November 2020, the number of cars forming regular services was reduced from 4–6 to 2–3, with the Green car (first class) also being removed from all services. The service frequency remains the same. The KiHa 85 DMUs were fully replaced by new HC85 Hybrid units in July 2023.
