= Ishinden Station =

Railway station in Tsu, Mie Prefecture, Japan

Ishinden Station 一身田駅
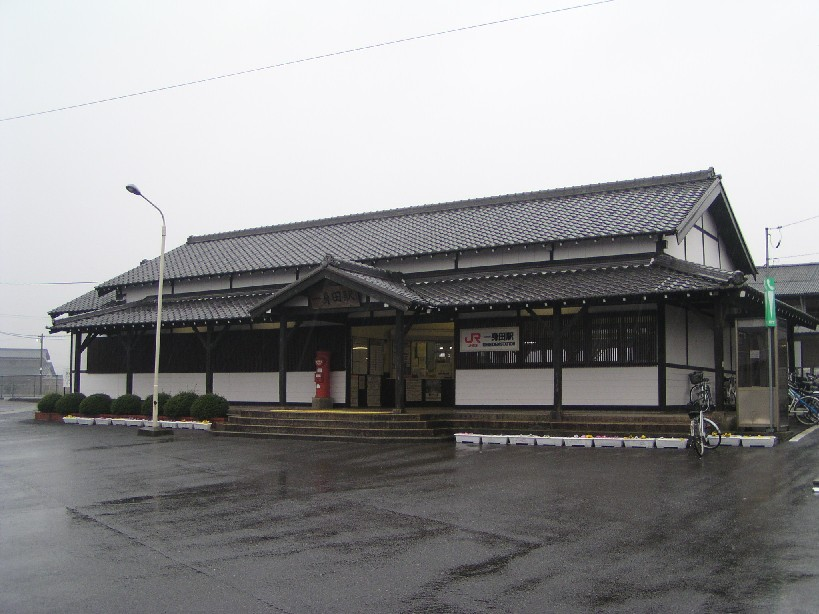
- Ishinden Station

General information
- Location: 861 Osato-Kubota, Tsu-shi, Mie-ken 514-0125; Japan
- Coordinates: 34°45′45.9″N 136°29′58.8″E
- Operator: JR Tōkai
- Line: ■ Kisei Main Line
- Distance: 12.1 km from Kameyama
- Platforms: 2 side platforms
- Connections: Bus terminal

History
- Opened: August 21, 1891; 135 years ago

Passengers
- FY2019: 1272 daily
Location
- Location within Mie Prefecture Location within Japan

Ishinden Station (一身田駅, Ishinden-eki) is a passenger railway station in located in the city of Tsu, Mie Prefecture, Japan, operated by Central Japan Railway Company (JR Tōkai).

== Lines ==
Ishinden Station is served by the Kisei Main Line, and is 12.1 rail kilometers from the terminus of the line at Kameyama Station.

== Station layout ==
The station consists of two opposed side platforms connected by a footbridge.

=== Platforms ===
1	■ Kisei Main Line	For Tsu, Iseshi, Toba, Shingu
2	■ Kisei Main Line	For Kameyama

== Adjacent stations ==
«	Service	»
Central Japan Railway Company (JR Central)
Kisei Main Line
Rapid: Does not stop at this station
Shimonoshō	Local	Tsu

== History ==
Ishinden Station opened on August 21, 1891, as a station on the Tsu spur line of the privately owned Kansai Railway. The line was nationalized on October 1, 1907, becoming the Sangu Line of the Japanese Government Railways (JGR) on October 12, 1909. The current station building was completed in December 1923. The station was transferred to the control of the Japan National Railways (JNR) Kisei Main Line on July 15, 1959. The station was absorbed into the JR Central network upon the privatization of the JNR on April 1, 1987. The station has been unattended since October 1, 2011.

== Passenger statistics ==
In fiscal 2019, the station was used by an average of 1272 passengers daily (boarding passengers only).

== Surrounding area ==
- Takadahonzan Senshu-ji
- Takada Junior College
- Takada Junior and Senior High School
- Tsu City Ichimitsu Tanaka Junior High School
- Isshinden Elementary School

== See also ==
- List of railway stations in Japan
