= Suzuka International University =

Coordinates: 34°48′30.8″N 136°32′20.3″E

Suzuka International University (鈴鹿国際大学, Suzuka kokusai daigaku) is a private university in Suzuka, Mie, Japan, established in 1994. Suzuka Junior College is located on the same campus.
