= Suzuka Junior College =

Coordinates: 34°48′30.8″N 136°32′20.3″E

- 鈴鹿短期大学
- Type: Private
- Established: 1966
- Location: Suzuka, Mie, Japan
- Website: Suzuka Junior College

Suzuka Junior College (鈴鹿短期大学, Suzuka Tanki Daigaku) is a private Junior College in the city of Suzuka, Mie, Japan. It was established in 1966 as women's college. It became coeducation in 1987. The college is located on the same campus as Suzuka International University.
