= HC85 series =

Japanese train type

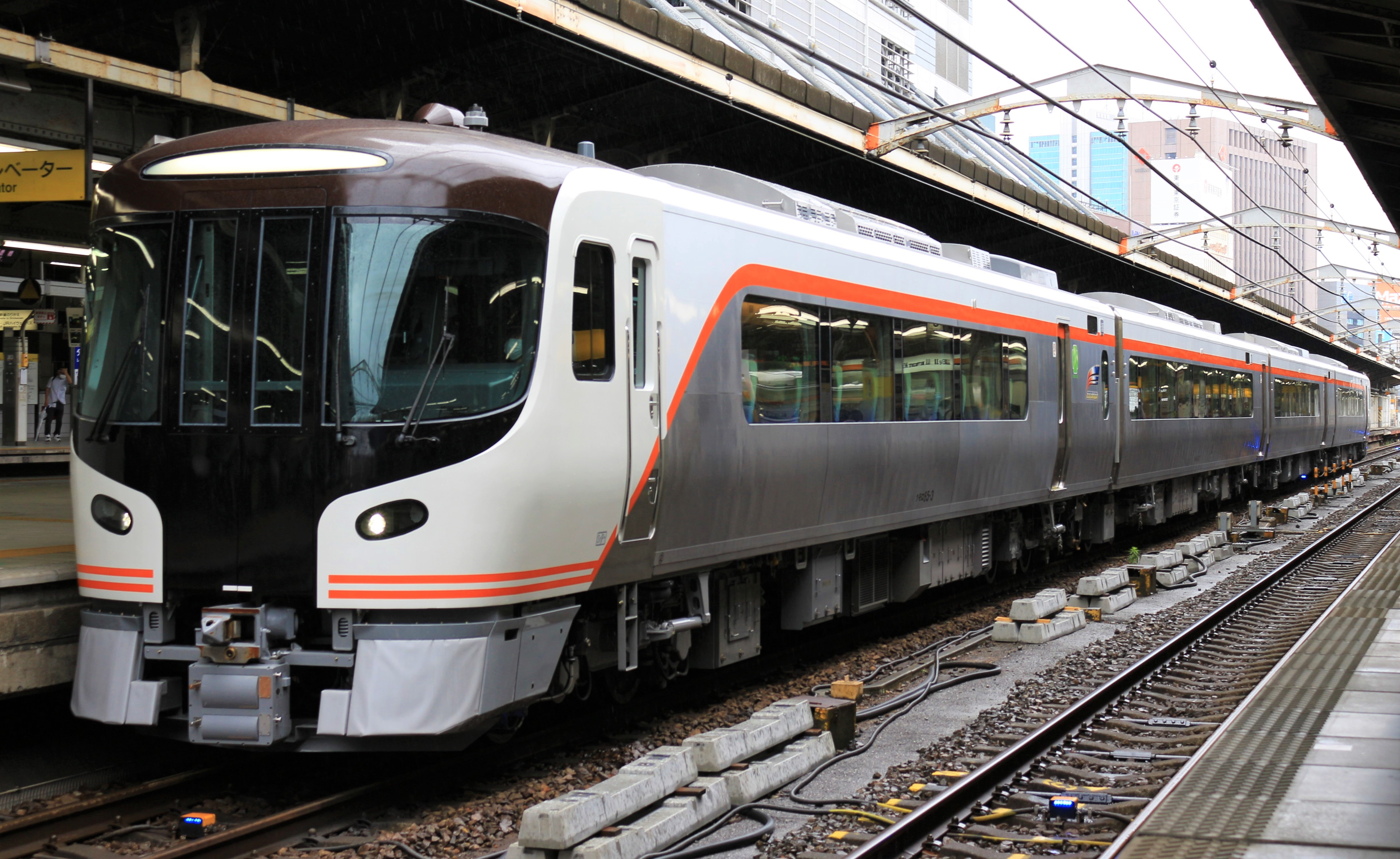
- HC85 series at Nagoya Station in July 2022
- In service: 1 July 2022 – present
- Manufacturer: Nippon Sharyo
- Built at: Toyokawa
- Replaced: KiHa 85 series
- Constructed: 2019, 2022–
- Number under construction: 6 vehicles
- Number built: 68 vehicles; 12 × 4-car; 10 × 2-car
- Formation: 2/4 cars per trainset
- Fleet numbers: D1– (4-car sets); D101– (2-car sets); D201– (monoclass 4-car sets)
- Operator: JR Central
- Depot: Nagoya
- Lines served: Kisei Main Line; Takayama Main Line

Specifications
- Car body construction: Stainless steel
- Car length: 21,300 mm (69 ft 11 in)
- Width: 2,918 mm (9 ft 6.9 in)
- Height: 3,750 mm (12 ft 4 in) (end cars); 3,640 mm (11 ft 11 in) (intermediate cars)
- Doors: 1 pair per side
- Maximum speed: 120 km/h (75 mph)
- Traction system: Variable-frequency
- Engine type: Diesel, straight-six
- Traction motors: Permanent-magnet synchronous motor
- Power output: 336 kW (450 hp) per engine
- Track gauge: 1,067 mm (3 ft 6 in)

Notes/references
- This train won the 66th Blue Ribbon Award in 2023.

The HC85 series (HC85系, HC85-kei) is a diesel-electric multiple unit (DEMU) train type built by Nippon Sharyo for use on limited express services operated by Central Japan Railway Company (JR Central). Intended to replace the KiHa 85 series, a prototype trainset was completed in late 2019, with a full-production fleet first materializing in 2022. The fleet was first introduced into service on 1 July 2022 on the Takayama Main Line.

== Design ==
The first set was manufactured by Nippon Sharyo at its Toyokawa facility. JR Central calls it a "hybrid car", due to the train having electric motors and battery packs, in addition to power supplied by an onboard diesel generator. This hybrid-diesel power system generates battery power from braking. The energy stored in batteries is then used to assist the diesel motor when accelerating. Total CO_{2} emissions emitted by the train is reduced compared to its predecessor powered only by diesel.

== Formation ==
The sets are formed as follows.

4-car sets (Green car accommodation)
	← Toyama, Takayama, Nagoya Gifu, Osaka→			
Designation	Mc1	M1	M2	Msc
Numbering	KuMoHa 85-0	MoHa 84-0	MoHa 84-100	KuMoRo 85-0
Capacity	56	50	68	36

4-car sets (standard class only)
	← Toyama, Takayama, Nagoya Gifu, Osaka→			
Designation	Mc1	M1	M2	Mc4
Numbering	KuMoHa 85-0	MoHa 84-0	MoHa 84-100	KuMoHa 85-300
Capacity	56	50	68	44

2-car sets
	← Toyama, Takayama, Nagoya Gifu, Osaka→ ← Shingu, Kii-Katsuura Nagoya→	
Designation	Mc2	Mc3
Numbering	KuMoHa 85-100	KuMoHa 85-200
Capacity	56	40

== Interior ==
Seating across all cars consists primarily of 2+2 abreast seating. Also included are power outlets for all seats, free Wi-Fi, and universal-access toilets. The standard-class interior's seats use a seat moquette of a red–orange gradient, inspired by the autumn leaves alongside the line. Wheelchair spaces are also provided.

Green cars, which are only available on some four-car sets, incorporate a theme of calmness and quality. The seats use seat moquette with a blue–green gradient, inspired by the greenery alongside the railway line, as well as the river and the sky at dusk.

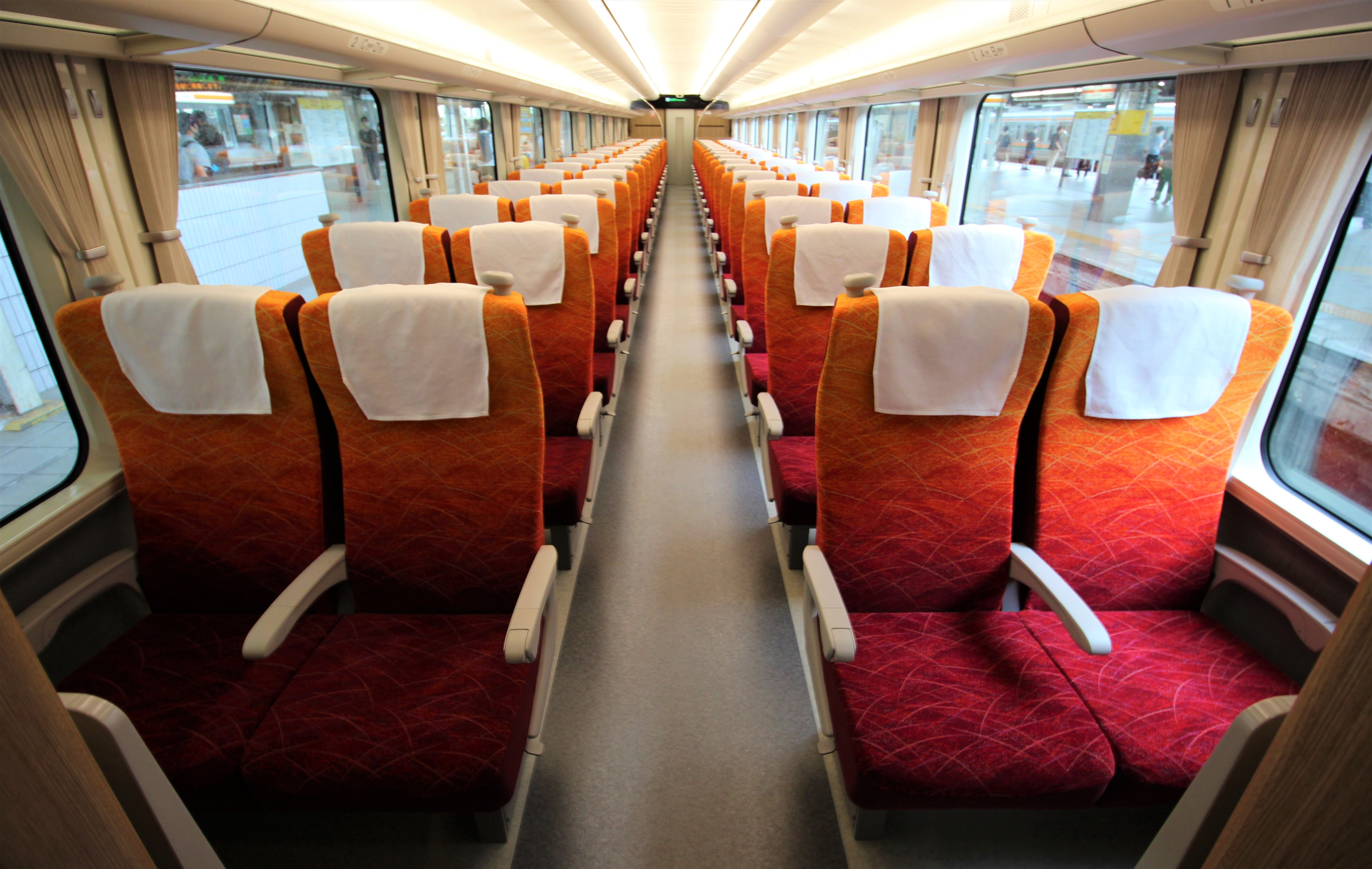
Standard-class interior

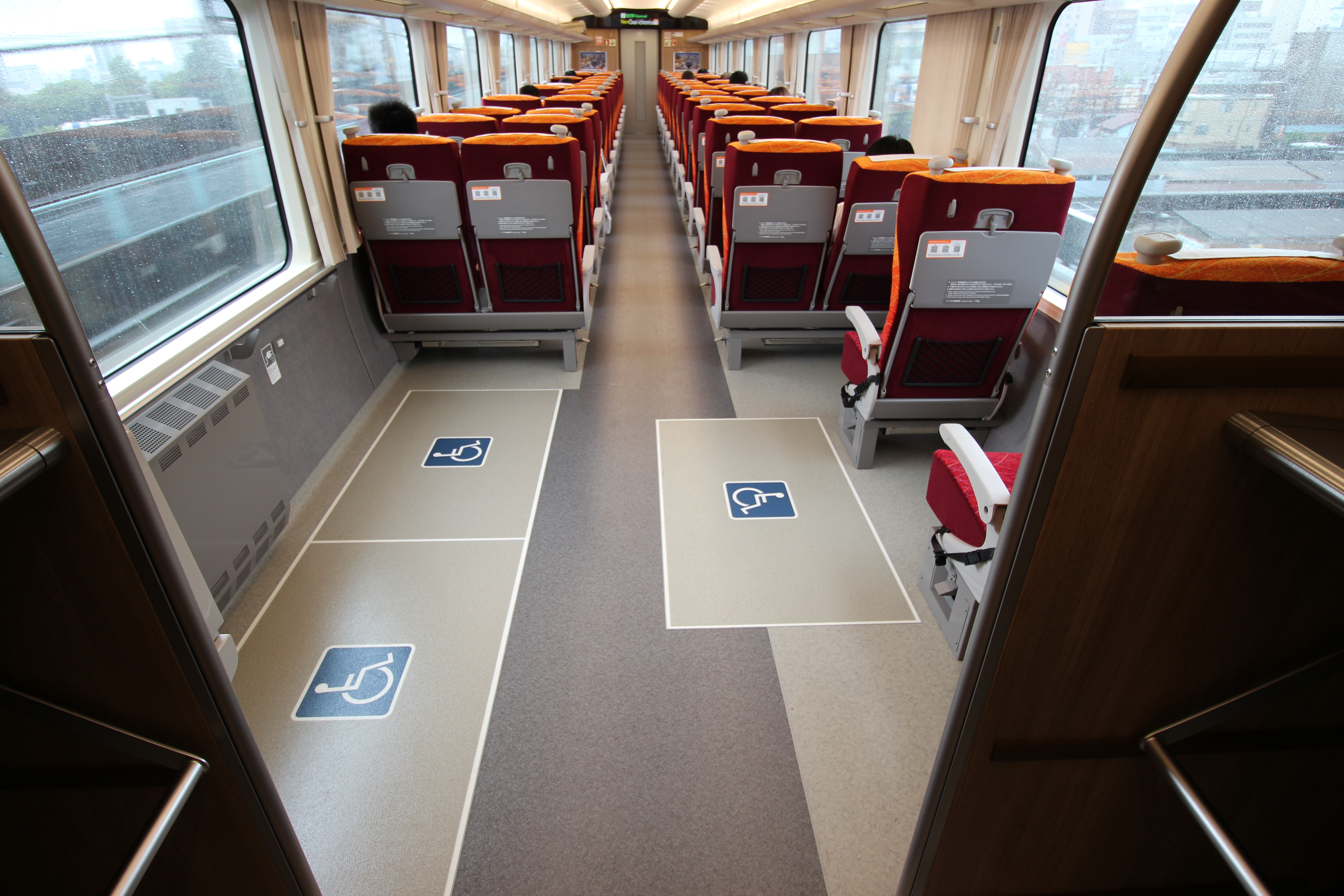
Standard-class interior with wheelchair spaces

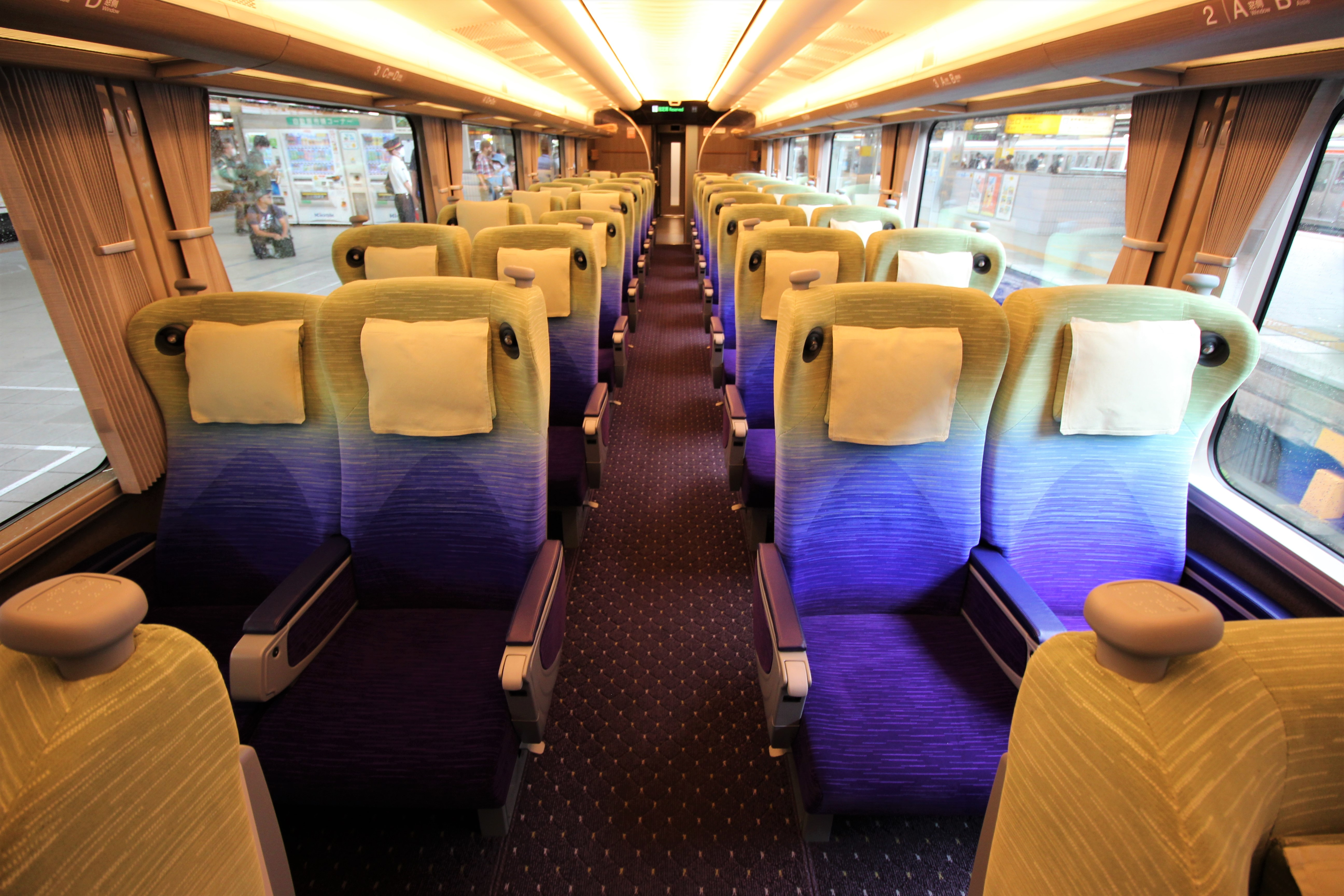
Green car interior

== History ==
The first set was unveiled in December 2019. The set has since been deployed on test runs.

Mass production commenced during fiscal 2022, with test runs for the first two production sets, D2 and D3, commencing on 21 April 2022. A total of 68 vehicles were built by fiscal 2023, and the prototype set is due to be upgraded to mass-production standards.

The fleet entered service on 1 July 2022, operating on Hida limited-express services on the Takayama Main Line between Nagoya and Takayama. From the start of the revised timetable on 18 March 2023, all Hida services used HC85 series trainsets. JR Central introduced the fleet on Nanki limited-express services on the Kisei Main Line from 1 July 2023.

The HC85 series received the 2023 Blue Ribbon Award, presented annually by the Japan Railfan Club.

In June 2025, JR Central announced its plans to procure six additional HC85 series cars.

=== Fleet details ===
As of 1 April 2024, the fleet consists of twelve 4-car sets and ten 2-car sets, all based at Nagoya Depot.

4-car sets
Set No.	Manufacturer	Built	Remarks
D1	Nippon Sharyo	2019	Prototype set
D2	Nippon Sharyo	2022	First production sets
D3	Nippon Sharyo	2022	First production sets
D4	Nippon Sharyo	2022	
D5	Nippon Sharyo	2022	
D6	Nippon Sharyo	2022	
D7	Nippon Sharyo	2022	
D8	Nippon Sharyo	2022	
D201	Nippon Sharyo	January 2023	Standard class only
D202	Nippon Sharyo	January 2023	Standard class only
D203	Nippon Sharyo	February 2023	Standard class only
D204	Nippon Sharyo	April 2023	Standard class only

2-car sets
Set No.	Manufacturer	Built	Remarks
D101	Nippon Sharyo	2022	
D102	Nippon Sharyo	2022	
D103	Nippon Sharyo	2022	
D104	Nippon Sharyo	December 2022	
D105	Nippon Sharyo	December 2022	
D106	Nippon Sharyo	April 2023	
D107	Nippon Sharyo	April 2023	
D108	Nippon Sharyo	2023	
D109	Nippon Sharyo	2023	
D110	Nippon Sharyo	2023	
