= Suzuka, Mie =

Suzuka 鈴鹿市
- City
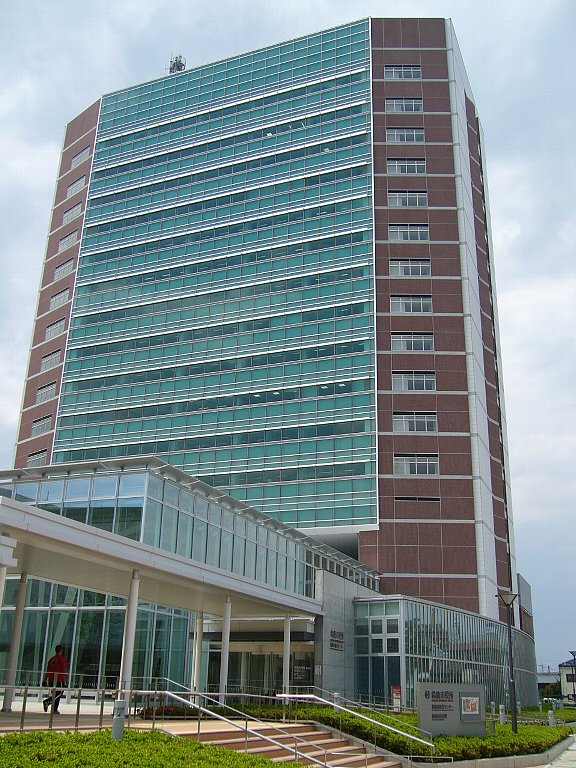
- Suzuka City Office

- Flag Seal

- Location of Suzuka in Mie Prefecture

- Coordinates: 34°52′55.1″N 136°35′3″E
- Country: Japan
- Region: Kansai
- Prefecture: Mie

Government
  - Mayor: Noriko Suematsu (since May 2011)

Area
  - Total: 194.46 km^{2} (75.08 sq mi)

Population (August 2020)
  - Total: 197,977
  - Density: 1,018.1/km^{2} (2,636.8/sq mi)
- Time zone: UTC+9 (Japan Standard Time)
- Tree: Japanese zelkova
- Flower: Satsuki azalea
- Phone number: 059-382-1100
- Address: 1-18-18 Kanbe, Suzuka-shi, Mie-ken 513-8701
- Website: Official website

Suzuka (鈴鹿市, Suzuka-shi) is a city in Mie Prefecture, Japan. As of 31 July 2020, the city had an estimated population of 197,977 in 87,680 households and a population density of 1000 persons per km^{2}. The total area of the city is 194.46 square kilometres (75.08 square miles).

== Geography ==
Suzuka is in northeastern Mie Prefecture, in northern Kii Peninsula, bordered by Ise Bay to the east. Parts of the city are within the borders of the Ise-no-Umi Prefectural Natural Park and the Suzuka Quasi-National Park.

== Climate ==
Suzuka has a humid subtropical climate (Köppen Cfa) characterized by warm summers and cool winters with light to no snowfall. The average annual temperature in Suzuka is 15.6 °C. The average annual rainfall is 1737 mm with September as the wettest month. The temperatures are highest on average in August, at around 27.0 °C, and lowest in January, at around 4.7 °C.

== Demographics ==
The population of Suzuka has more than doubled over the 50-year period 1960-2010.

Historical population
Year	Pop.	±%
1960	96,822	—
1970	121,185	+25.2%
1980	156,250	+28.9%
1990	174,105	+11.4%
2000	186,151	+6.9%
2010	199,184	+7.0%

== History ==
Suzuka, as a place name, is mentioned in the Nara period chronicle Nihon Shoki. The ancient Tōkaidō passed through Suzuka, and the Nara-period provincial capital was within its borders. During the Sengoku period, the area was controlled by Oda Nobutaka, the third son of Oda Nobunaga, who ruled from Kanbe Castle. During the Edo period, much of the area was under the control of the 15,000 koku Kanbe Domain, ruled by the Honda clan from 1732 until the Meiji restoration in 1871. During this period, two post stations were within the modern city limits: Ishiyakushi-juku and Shōno-juku, which prospered due to pilgrimage traffic to the Ise Grand Shrine.

After the start of the Meiji period, the area was organized as part of Suzuka District in 1889 and the town of Kanbe was established with the creation of the modern municipalities system on April 1, 1889. On December 1, 1942, Kanbe merged with the villages of Shirako, Inau, Iino, Kawano, Ichinomiya, Mida, Tanagaki, Wakamatsu, Ko, Shono, Takatsuse, Makita, and Ishiyakushi to form the city of Suzuka. The city further expanded in 1954 by annexing the villages of Sakae, Amana and Aikawa and portions of neighboring Kameyama.

== Government ==
Suzuka has a mayor-council form of government with a directly elected mayor and a unicameral city council of 32 members. Suzuka contributes four members to the Mie Prefectural Assembly. In terms of national politics, the city is part of Mie 2nd district of the lower house of the Diet of Japan.

== Economy ==
Suzuka boasts a significant industrial market, having major factories for Sharp and Honda in its bounds. These companies outsource part of their labor to South American nationals to secure a contract-based workforce.

Although the Japanese government encourages mandatory English-language education across the nation, in Suzuka many courses are offered by private cram schools (juku) and by publicly funded institutions supporting Portuguese and Spanish. In a controversial move, the city's governing body, from April 2004, requires all garbage information and local signage to be in Japanese and Portuguese (but not English).

== Education ==
=== Colleges and universities ===
- Suzuka International University
- Suzuka Junior College
- Suzuka National College of Technology
- Suzuka University of Medical Science

=== Primary and secondary education ===
Suzuka has 30 public elementary schools and ten public middle school operated by the city government, and five public high schools operated by the Mie Prefectural Department of Education. There are also one private middle school and one private high school, and the prefecture also operates one special education school for disabled people.

=== International schools ===
- International schools: Escola Alegria de Saber (エスコーラ・アレグリア・デ・サベール) - Brazilian school Formerly Suzuka had another Brazilian school: Escola Sol Nascente.

== Transport ==
=== Railway ===
JR Tōkai – Kansai Main Line

- Kawano - Kasado

Ise Railway – Ise Line

- Suzuka – Tamagaki – Suzuka Circuit Inō – Tokuda – Nakaseko

Kintetsu Railway - Nagoya Line

- Nagonoura - Mida - Ise-Wakamatsu - Chiyozaki - Shiroko - Tsuzumigaura - Isoyama

Kintetsu Railway - Suzuka Line

- Ise-Wakamatsu - Yanagi - Suzukashi - Mikkaichi - Hiratachō

=== Highway ===
- Higashi-Meihan Expressway
- Shin-Meishin Expressway
- National Route 1
- National Route 23
- National Route 25
- National Route 306

== Local attractions ==
- Ise Kokubun-ji ruins, National Historic Site
- Ise Kokufu ruins, National Historic Site
- Ōzuka Kofun, National Historic Site

== Sports ==
- Mie Honda Heat – rugby club
- Atletico Suzuka Club – association football club

=== Motor racing circuit ===
Suzuka Circuit map

Suzuka Circuit is a Honda-owned racetrack. It has been the home of F1's Japanese Grand Prix since 1987, with the exception of four years (2007 and 2008, when the race was held at the Fuji Speedway, as well as 2020 and 2021, when Japan did not host a Grand Prix race). It is the only figure-eight circuit in the championship, and is very popular with the drivers, in spite of its numerous difficult bends. Located next to the circuit is the Honda Safety Riding/Driving School, where thousands of car and motorcycle drivers have been trained, including many police officers and instructors throughout the world.

== Sister cities ==
- Le Mans, Maine, France, since May 27, 1990
- Bellefontaine, Ohio, United States, since August 7, 1991

== Notable people ==
- Miwa Asao, beach volleyball player
- Hideo Fukuyama, racing driver
- Reo Hatate, professional footballer
- Eisuke Nakanishi, professional soccer player
- Takafumi Ogura, professional soccer player
- Saitō Ryokuu, Meiji period author
- Sumie Sakai, professional wrestler
- Nobutsuna Sasaki, author, poet
- Nobuhide Tachi, racing driver
- Keisuke Tanimoto, professional baseball player
- Jo Shimoda, professional motocross rider
