= Kawarada Station =

Railway station in Yokkaichi, Mie Prefecture, Japan

CJ13 Kawarada Station 河原田駅
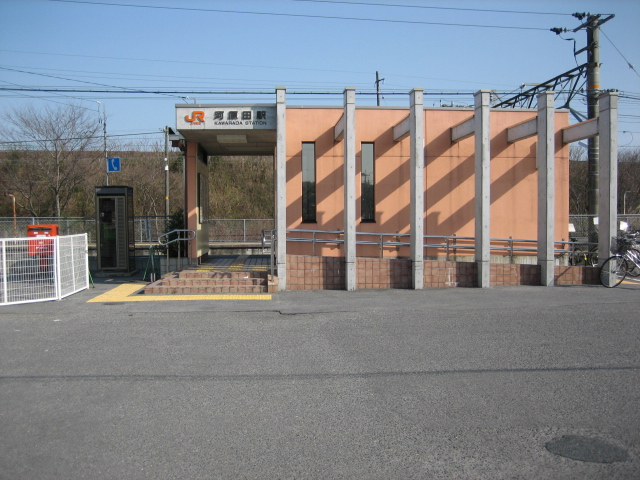
- Kawarada Station

General information
- Location: Kawarada 2179, Yokkaichi-shi, Mie-ken 510-0874; Japan
- Coordinates: 34°54′37.8″N 136°35′53.8″E
- Operator: JR Tōkai; Ise Railway
- Lines: Kansai Main Line; ■ Ise Line
- Distance: 44.1 km from Nagoya
- Platforms: 2 side + 1 island platform
- Connections: Bus terminal

Other information
- Station code: CJ13

History
- Opened: December 20, 1895

Passengers
- FY2019: 2127 (JR); 1779 (Ise Railway) daily
Location
- Location within Mie Prefecture Location within Japan

Track layout at Kawarada Station

Kawarada Station (河原田駅, Kawarada-eki) is an interchange passenger railway station in located in the city of Yokkaichi, Mie Prefecture, Japan, operated by Central Japan Railway Company (JR Tōkai) and the third sector railway company, Ise Railway.

== Lines ==
Kawarada Station is served by the JR Kansai Main Line, and is 44.1 rail kilometers from the terminus of the line at Nagoya Station. It is also officially the terminus of the 22.3 kilometer Ise Railway, although most trains continue through to Yokkaichi Station.

== Station layout ==
The station consists of two opposed side platforms, serving four tracks for use by the Kansai Main Line, and a single island platform for use by the Ise Railway.

=== Platforms ===
1	■ Kansai Main Line	For Yokkaichi, Kuwana and Nagoya
2	■ Kansai Main Line	For Kameyama

3	■ Ise Railway Ise Line	for Yokkaichi
4	■ Ise Railway Ise Line	for Suzuka and Tsu

== Adjacent stations ==
«	Service	»
Central Japan Railway Company (JR Central)
Kansai Main Line
Minami-Yokkaichi	Local	Kawano
Minami-Yokkaichi	Semi Rapid	Kawano
Minami-Yokkaichi	Rapid	Kawano
Ise Railway
Ise Line (3)
Minami-Yokkaichi (2) or Terminus	Local	Suzuka (4)
Rapid "Mie": Does not stop at this station
Limited Express "Nanki": Does not stop at this station

== History ==
Kawarada Station opened on December 20, 1895 as a station on the Kansai Railway. The line was nationalized on October 1, 1907, becoming part of the Japanese Government Railways (JGR) system. The station building was rebuilt in December 1915. The JGR became the Japan National Railways (JNR) after World War II. The JNR Ise Line began operations on September 1, 1973. The Ise Line was privatized on March 27, 1987, four days before the dissolution of the JNR on April 1, 1987. The present station building was completed in March 2003.

Station numbering was introduced to the section of the Kansai Main Line operated JR Central in March 2018; Kawarada Station was assigned station number CI13.

== Passenger statistics ==
In fiscal 2019, the JR station was used by an average of 2,127 passengers daily (boarding passengers only) and the Ise Railway portion of the station by 1779 passengers daily during the same period.

== Surrounding area ==
- Mie Prefectural Yokkaichi Agricultural High School
- Yokkaichi City Kawarada Elementary School
- Yokkaichi Kawarada Post Office

== See also ==
- List of railway stations in Japan
