= Suzuka Station =

Railway station in Suzuka, Mie Prefecture, Japan

Coordinates: 34°52′41.8″N 136°35′19.8″E

Suzuka Station 鈴鹿駅
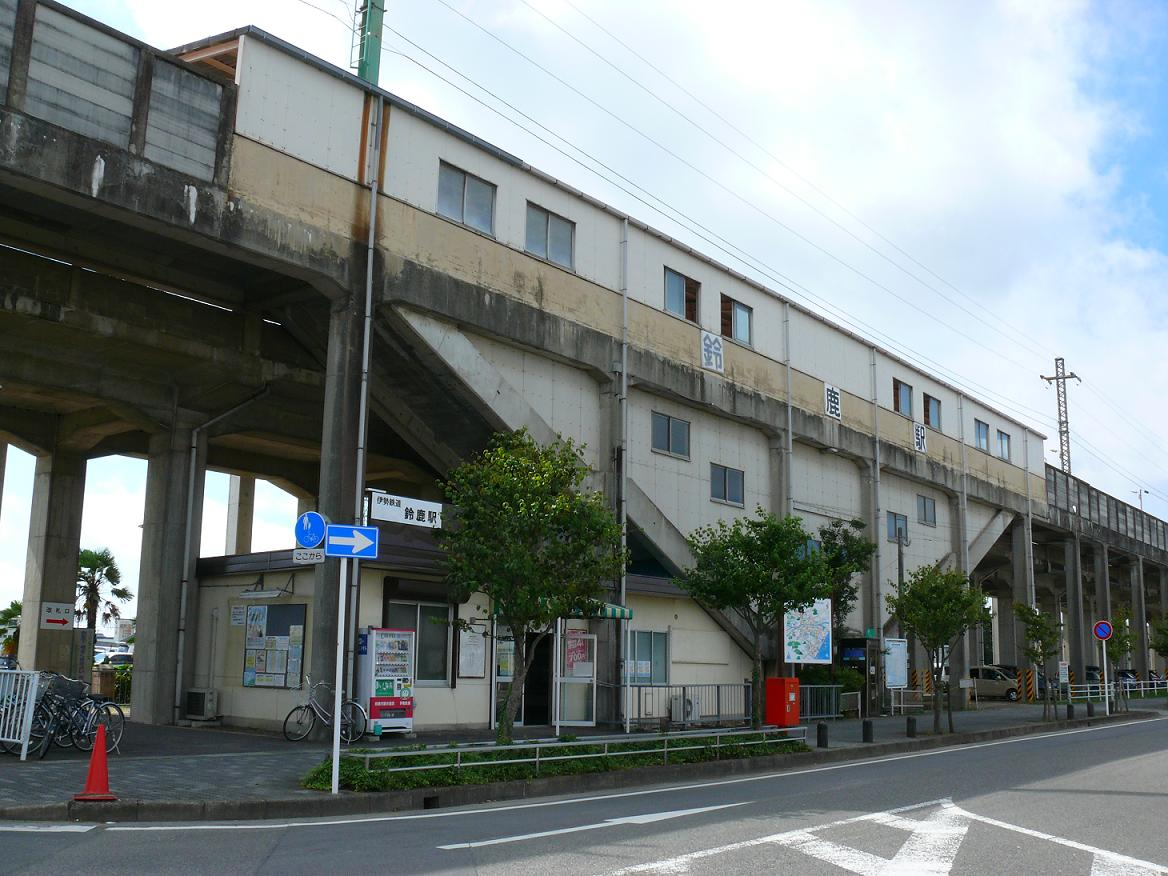
- Suzuka Station

General information
- Location: 1-11-1 Yabase, Suzuka, Mie （三重県鈴鹿市矢橋一丁目11-1） Japan
- Operator: Ise Railway
- Line: Ise Line

Other information
- Station code: 4

History
- Opened: 1973

Passengers
- FY2010: 220 daily
Location

Suzuka Station (鈴鹿駅, Suzuka-eki) is a railway station in Suzuka, Mie Prefecture, Japan, operated by Ise Railway. The station is 3.8 rail kilometers from the terminus of the line at Kawarada Station.

== History ==
Suzuka Station opened on September 1, 1973 as a station on the Japan National Railways (JNR) Ise Line. The Ise Line was privatized on March 27, 1987, four days before the dissolution of the JNR on April 1, 1987.

== Line ==
- Ise Railway Ise Line

== Station layout ==
Suzuka Station has two elevated opposed side platforms.

=== Platforms ===
1	■ Ise Railway Ise Line	for Yokkaichi, Kuwana and Nagoya
2	■ Ise Railway Ise Line	for Tsu, Iseshi, Toba, Shingu and Kii-Katsuura

== Adjacent stations ==
«	Service	»
Ise Railway
Ise Line (4)
Kawarada (3)	Local	Tamagaki (5)
Yokkaichi (1)	Rapid Mie	Suzuka Circuit Inō (6) (during racing events at Suzuka Circuit); Tsu (12) (usually)
Yokkaichi (1)	Rapid Mie 4 and 6 for Nagoya	Suzuka Circuit Inō (6, during racing events at Suzuka Circuit); Nakaseko (8)
Yokkaichi (1)	Limited Express Nanki	Suzuka Circuit Inō (6, during Formula 1 Japanese GP); Tsu (12, usually)
