= Tsu Station =

Railway station in Tsu, Mie Prefecture, Japan

Tsu Station 津駅
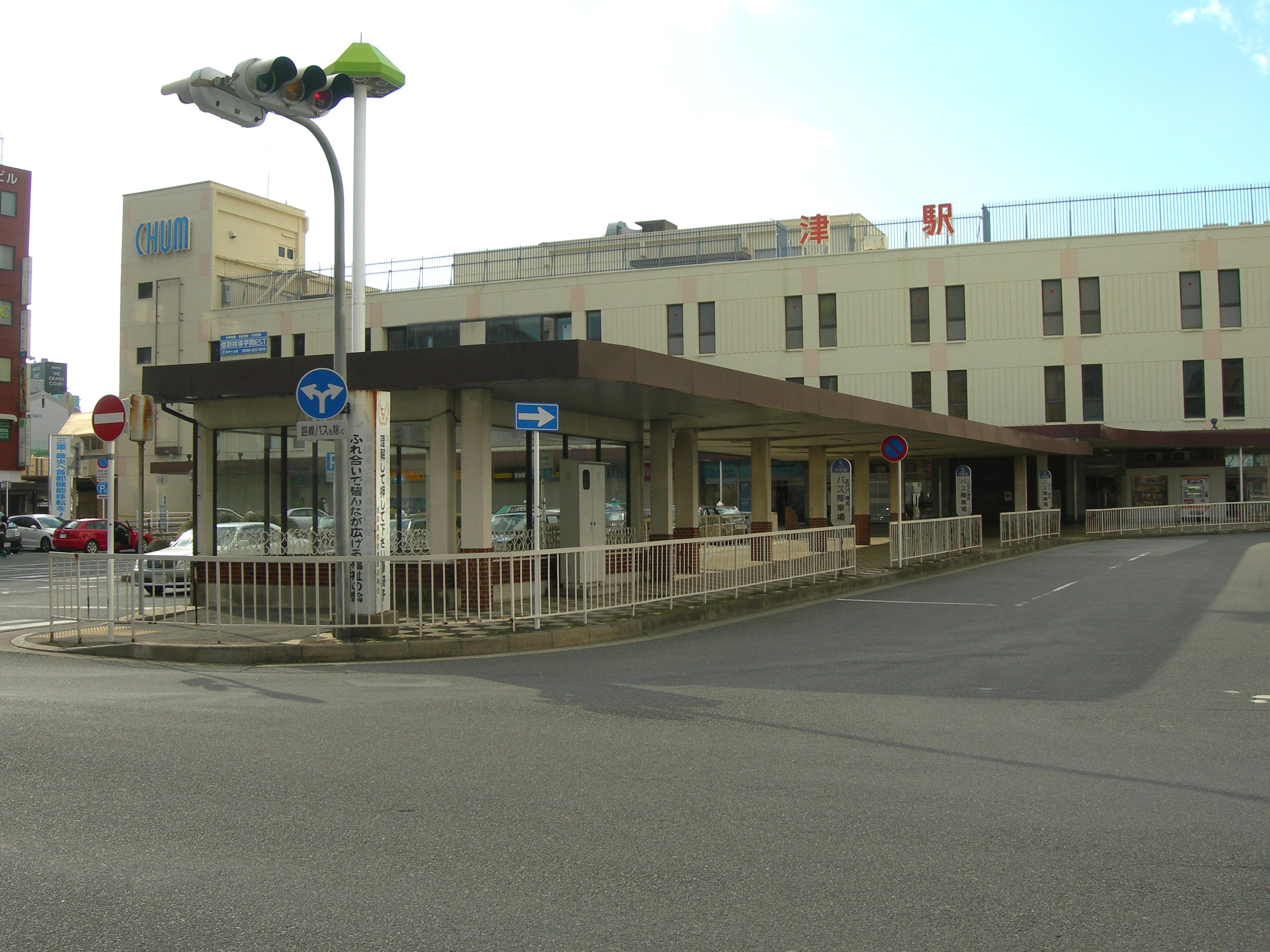
- Tsu Station east exit

General information
- Location: 1191-1 Hadokoro-cho, Tsu-shi, Mie-ken 514-0009; Japan
- Coordinates: 34°44′2.35″N 136°30′36.84″E
- Operator: JR Tōkai; Kintetsu Railway; Ise Railway
- Lines: ■ Kisei Main Line; Nagoya Line; Ise Railway Ise Line
- Distance: 15.5 km from Kameyama; 22.3 km from Yokkaichi; 12.3 km from Ise-Nakagawa
- Platforms: 2 island + 1 side + 1 bay platform

Other information
- Status: Staffed
- Station code: E39
- Website: Official website

History
- Opened: December 20, 1930; 95 years ago

Passengers
- FY2019: 3,609 (JR); 15,689 (Kintetsu); 1,691(Ise Railway) daily
Location
- Location within Mie Prefecture Location within Japan

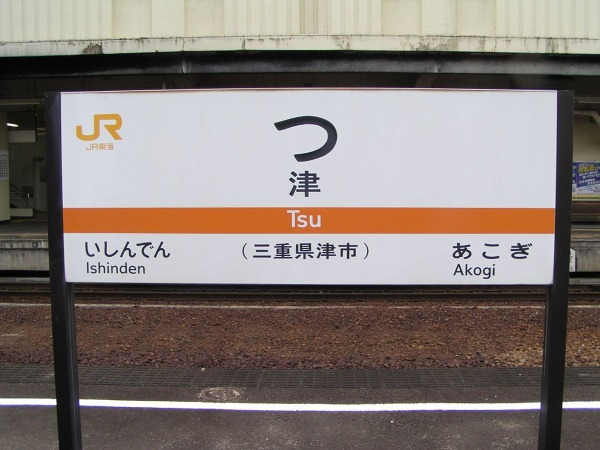
Station name in hiragana (つ), kanji (津) and rōmaji (Tsu)

Tsu Station (津駅, Tsu-eki) is a junction passenger railway station located in the city of Tsu, Mie Prefecture, operated by Central Japan Railway Company (JR Central), the private railway operator Kintetsu and the third sector Ise Railway. The name of the station is considered the shortest in Japan because it is the only station name that is written with one kana, even though other stations have shorter names when written in Latin letters, such as Oe Station.

== Lines ==
Tsu Station is served by the JR Kisei Main Line, and is located 15.5 km (9.6 mi) from the starting point of the line at Kameyama Station. It is 12.3 km (7.6 mi) from the terminus of the Nagoya Line at Ise-Nakagawa Station. It is also the terminus of the Ise Line and is 22.3 km (13.9 mi) from the opposing terminus at Yokkaichi Station.

== Station layout ==
The station consists of four ground-level platforms serving six tracks, connected by pedestrian footbridges. The JR uses one island platform and one side platform and the Kintetsu portion has one island platform. The Ise Railway uses a single bay platform.

=== Platforms ===
1	■ Ise Railway Ise Line	Local trains for Yokkaichi, via Suzuka
2	■ JR Central Kisei Line	Local trains, Rapid Mie and Limited Express Nanki for Matsusaka, Shingū, Iseshi, Toba and Kii-Katsuura
3	■ JR Central Kisei Line	Local trains for Kameyama
3	■ through to the Ise Railway Ise Line	Rapid Mie and Limited Express Nanki for Yokkaichi, Kuwana and Nagoya
4	■ JR Central Kisei Line	Local trains for Kameyama (siding); Local trains for Matsusaka, Taki, Shingū, Iseshi and Toba (siding)
5	■ Kintetsu Nagoya Line	Local, Express and Limited Express services for Ise-Nakagawa, Ōsaka, Kobe, Toba and Kashikojima
6	■ Kintetsu Nagoya Line	Local, Express and Limited Express services for Yokkaichi, Kuwana and Nagoya

== Adjacent stations ==
«	Service	»
JR Central Kisei Main Line
Ishinden	Local	Akogi
Ise Railway Ise Line	Rapid Mie	Matsusaka
Ise Railway Ise Line	Limited Express Nanki	Matsusaka
Kintetsu Nagoya Line
Edobashi	Local	Tsu-shimmachi
Edobashi	Express	Tsu-shimmachi
Shiroko	Limited Express	(Hisai); Ise-Nakagawa; Nabari (Osaka Line)
Kintetsu Nagoya	Limited Express (no stops between Nagoya and Tsu)	Iseshi (Yamada Line) (Yamato-Yagi) (Osaka Line); Tsuruhashi (Osaka Line)
Limited Express Shimakaze: Does not stop at this station
Ise Railway Ise Line (12)
Higashi-Ishinden (11)	Local	Terminus
Suzuka Circuit Inō (6) (during racing events at Suzuka Circuit); Suzuka (4)	Rapid Mie (usually)	Matsusaka (Kisei Line)
Nakaseko (8)	Rapid Mie 4 and 6 for Nagoya	Matsusaka (Kisei Line)
Suzuka Circuit Inō (6) (during Formula 1 Japanese GP); Suzuka (4)	Limited Express Nanki	Matsusaka (Kisei Line)

== History ==
Tsu Station opened on November 4, 1891, as a station on the Tsu spur line of the privately owned Kansai Railway. The line was nationalized on October 1, 1907, becoming the Sangū Line of the Japanese Government Railways on October 12, 1909. On April 3, 1932, the Sangū Express Electric Railway began operations at Tsu Station. This line underwent various changes in ownership, eventually becoming the Kintetsu Nagoya Line in 1944. The station was transferred to the control of the Japanese National Railways (JNR) Kisei Main Line on July 15, 1959. The JNR Ise Line began operations on September 1, 1973. The station was absorbed into the JR Central network upon the privatization of the JNR on April 1, 1987, with the Ise Line spun off to the private sector a few days earlier.

== Passenger statistics ==
In fiscal 2019, the JR portion of the station was used by an average of 3,609 passengers daily (boarding passengers only). During the same period, the Kintetsu portion was used by 15,689 passengers and the Ise Railway portion by 1,691 passengers daily.

== Surrounding area ==
- Mie Prefectural Office
- Tsukairaku Park
- Mie Gokoku Shrine
- Mie Prefectural Art Museum

== See also ==
- List of railway stations in Japan
