= Yokkaichi Station =

Railway station in Yokkaichi, Mie Prefecture, Japan

CJ11 Yokkaichi Station 四日市駅
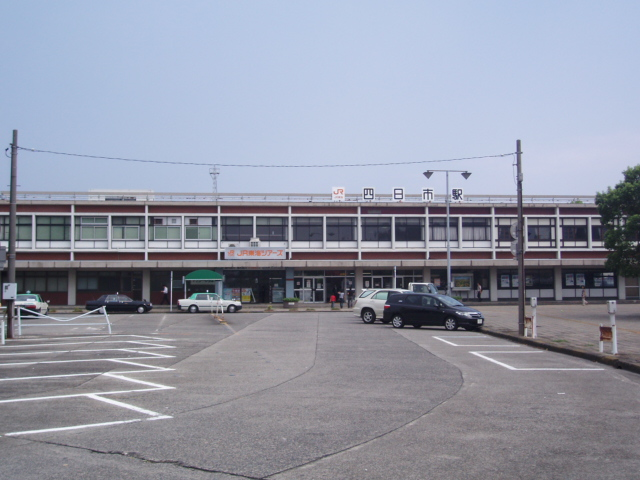
- JR Yokkaichi Station, August 2006

General information
- Location: 3-85 Honmachi, Yokkaichi-shi, Mie-ken 510-0093; Japan
- Coordinates: 34.9630863°N 136.6296566°E
- Operator: Ise Railway; JR Tōkai; JR Freight
- Lines: Kansai Main Line; ■ Ise Line
- Distance: 37.2 km from Nagoya
- Platforms: 1 island platform
- Connections: Bus terminal

Other information
- Station code: CJ11
- Website: Official website

History
- Opened: December 25, 1890

Passengers
- FY2019: 2286 daily
Location
- Location within Mie Prefecture Location within Japan

Yokkaichi Station (四日市駅, Yokkaichi-eki) is a railway station located in the city of Yokkaichi, Mie Prefecture, Japan, operated by Central Japan Railway Company (JR Tōkai). It also has a freight terminal of the Japan Freight Railway Company (JR Freight). Downtown Yokkaichi is located about 1 km from the station, which is less convenient than the centrally located Kintetsu Yokkaichi Station.

== Lines ==
Yokkaichi Station is served by the Kansai Main Line, and is 37.2 rail kilometers from the terminus of the line at Nagoya Station. Trains on the Ise Railway Ise Line also terminate at this station, although the official terminal station for the line is at Kawarada Station.

== Station layout ==
The station consists of one, very wide, complex island platform, serving three tracks. The Kansai Main Line uses the outer edges of the island platform, and the Ise Railway uses an indention in one side of the platform, which forms a single bay platform.

=== Platforms ===
1	■ Kansai Main Line	for Kameyama for Kuwana and Nagoya (some services)
1	■ Ise Railway Ise Line	limited express Nanki and rapid Mie for Tsu, Matsusaka, Iseshi, Toba, Shingu and Kii-Katsuura
2	■ Kansai Main Line	for Kuwana and Nagoya
3	■ Ise Railway Ise Line	local trains for Tsu, via Suzuka

== Adjacent stations ==
«	Service	»
JR Central Kansai Main Line
Kuwana	Limited Express Nanki	Suzuka (Ise Railway)
Kuwana	Rapid Mie	Suzuka (Ise Railway)
Kuwana	Rapid	Minami-Yokkaichi
Tomidahama	Semi Rapid	Minami-Yokkaichi
Tomidahama	Local	Minami-Yokkaichi
Ise Railway Ise Line (1)
Terminus	Local	Minami-Yokkaichi (2)

== History ==
Yokkaichi Station opened on December 25, 1890, as a station on the Kansai Railway. The Kansai Railway was nationalized on October 1, 1907, and the station became part of the Japanese Government Railways (JGR) system. A new station building was completed on November 3, 1913. The Ise Line began operations from March 1, 1922. JGR became the Japanese National Railways (JNR) after World War II. The station was absorbed into the JR Central network upon the privatization of JNR on April 1, 1987. A new station building was completed in 2012.

Station numbering was introduced to the section of the Kansai Main Line operated JR Central in March 2018; Yokkaichi Station was assigned station number CI11.

== Passenger statistics ==
In fiscal 2019, the station was used by an average of 2286 passengers daily (boarding passengers only).

== Surrounding area ==
- Yokkaichi City Hall
- Yokkaichi Public Employment Security Office
- Yokkaichi Post Office
- Yokkaichi Municipal Central Elementary School

== See also ==
- List of railway stations in Japan
