= Shijuku Station =

Railway station in Iga, Mie Prefecture, Japan

Shijuku Station 四十九駅
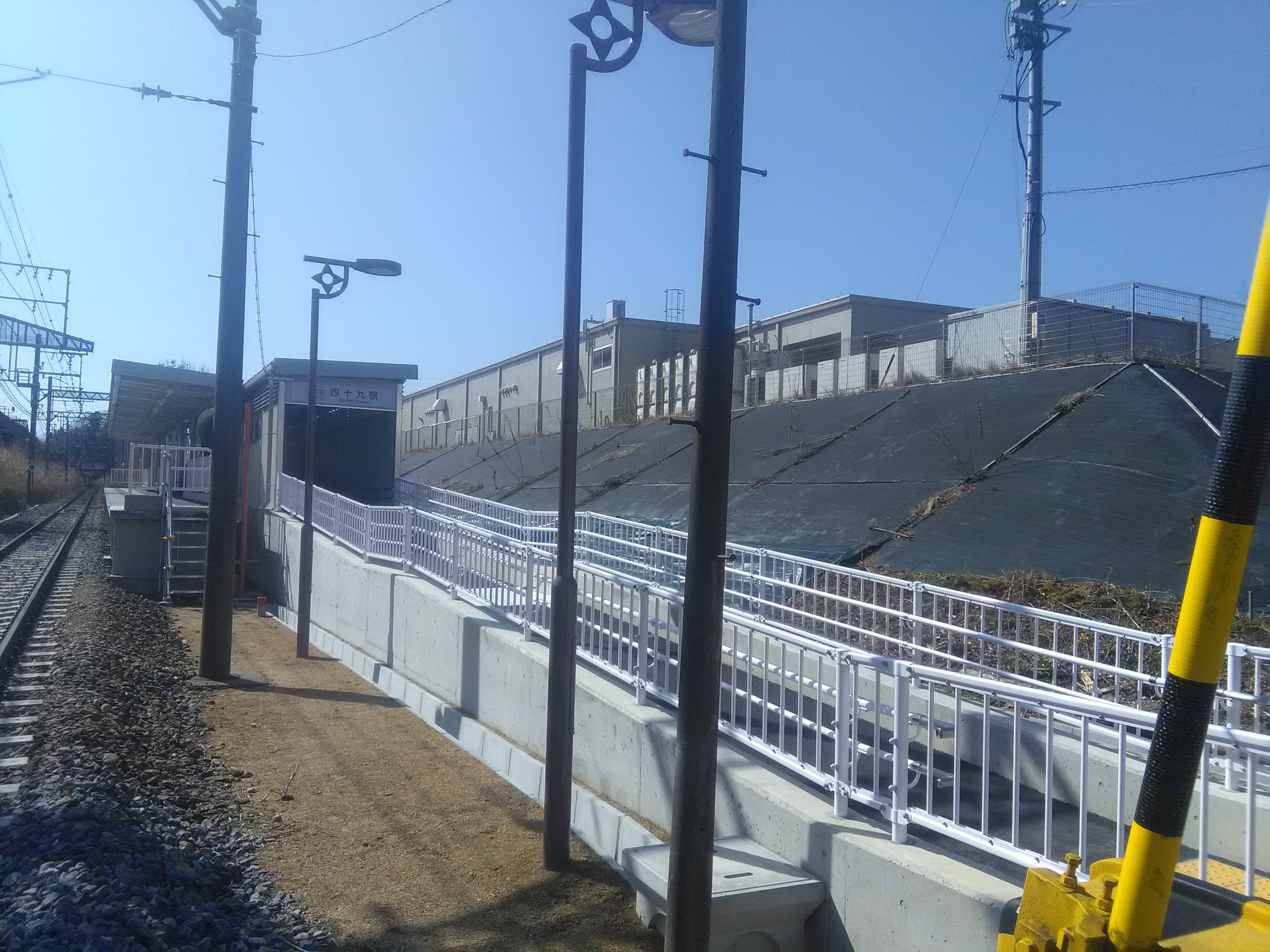
- Shijuku Station in March 2018

General information
- Location: Iga-shi, Mie-ken 518-0823; Japan
- Coordinates: 34°44′53.5″N 136°08′13.2″E
- Operator: Iga Railway
- Line: ■ Iga Line
- Distance: 6.5 km from Iga-Ueno
- Platforms: 1 side platform
- Tracks: 1

Other information
- Website: Official website

History
- Opened: 17 March 2018

Passengers
- FY2019: 87 daily
Location
- Location within Mie Prefecture Location within Japan

Shijuku Station (四十九駅, Shijuku-eki) is a passenger railway station in located in the city of Iga, Mie Prefecture, Japan, operated by the private railway operator Iga Railway.

== Lines ==
Shijuku Station is served by the Iga Line, and is located 6.5 rail kilometers from the starting point of the line at Iga-Ueno Station.

== Station layout ==
The station consists of a single 47 m long side platform serving the bidirectional single line. The station is unattended.

== Platform ==
1	■ Iga Line	For Iga-Ueno; For Iga-Kambe

== Adjacent stations ==
«	Service	»
Iga Line
Kuwamachi	Local	Idamichi

== History ==
Another station also named Shijuku previously existed approximately 300 m from the location of the new station until services were suspended in June 1945 and formally closed in May 1969.

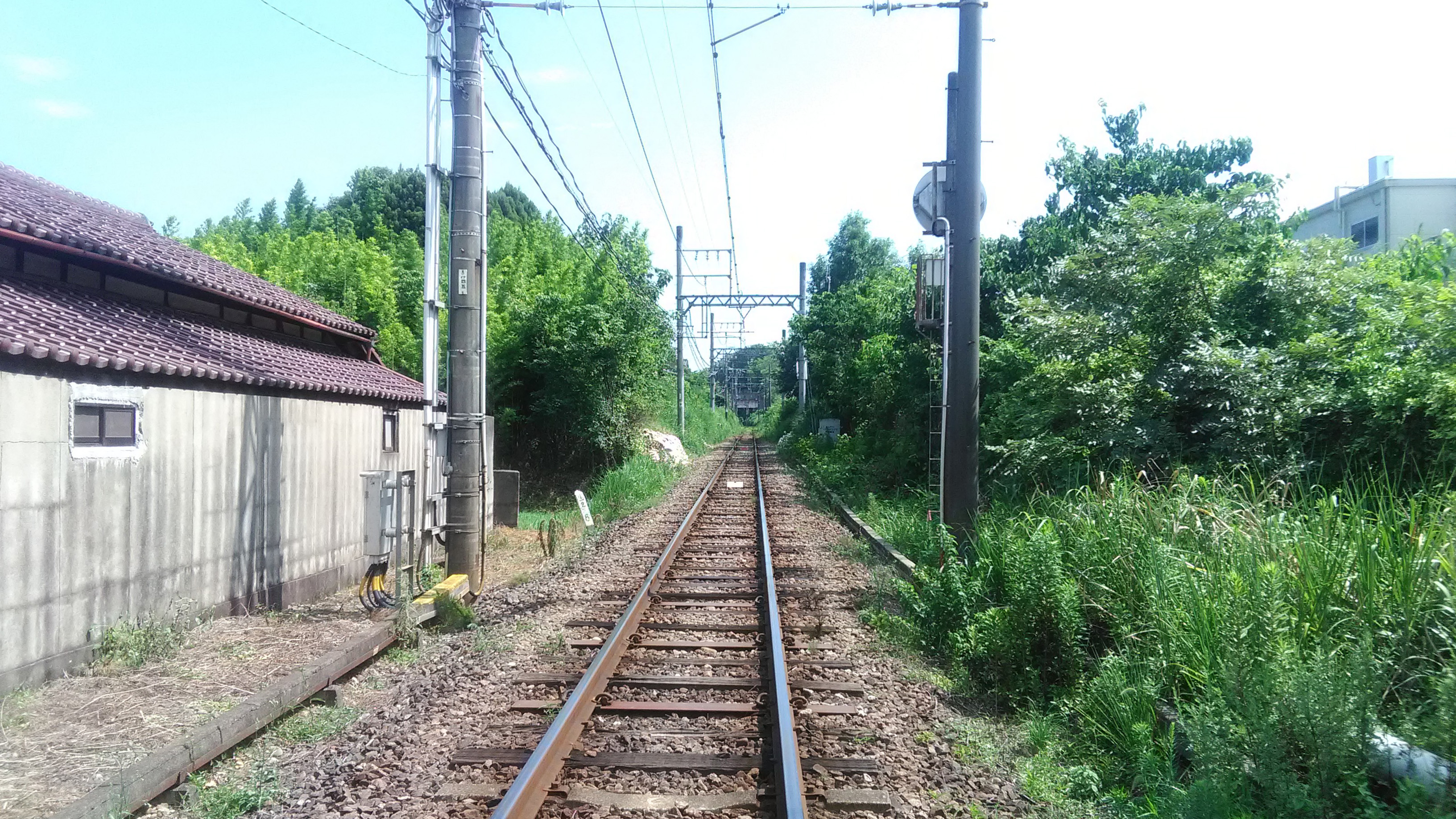
The planned station construction site in August 2017

Construction of the new station started in July 2017. The total construction cost is estimated at JPY246 million.

The name of the new station was announced by the city of Iga in October 2017.

== Passenger statistics ==
In fiscal 2019, the station was used by an average of 87 passengers daily (boarding passengers only).

== Surrounding area ==
- Iga City Office
- Aeon Town Iga-Ueno shopping mall
- Iga City General Hospital
- National Route 422

== See also ==
- List of railway stations in Japan
