= Ichibe Station =

Railway station in Iga, Mie Prefecture, Japan

Ichibe Station 市部駅
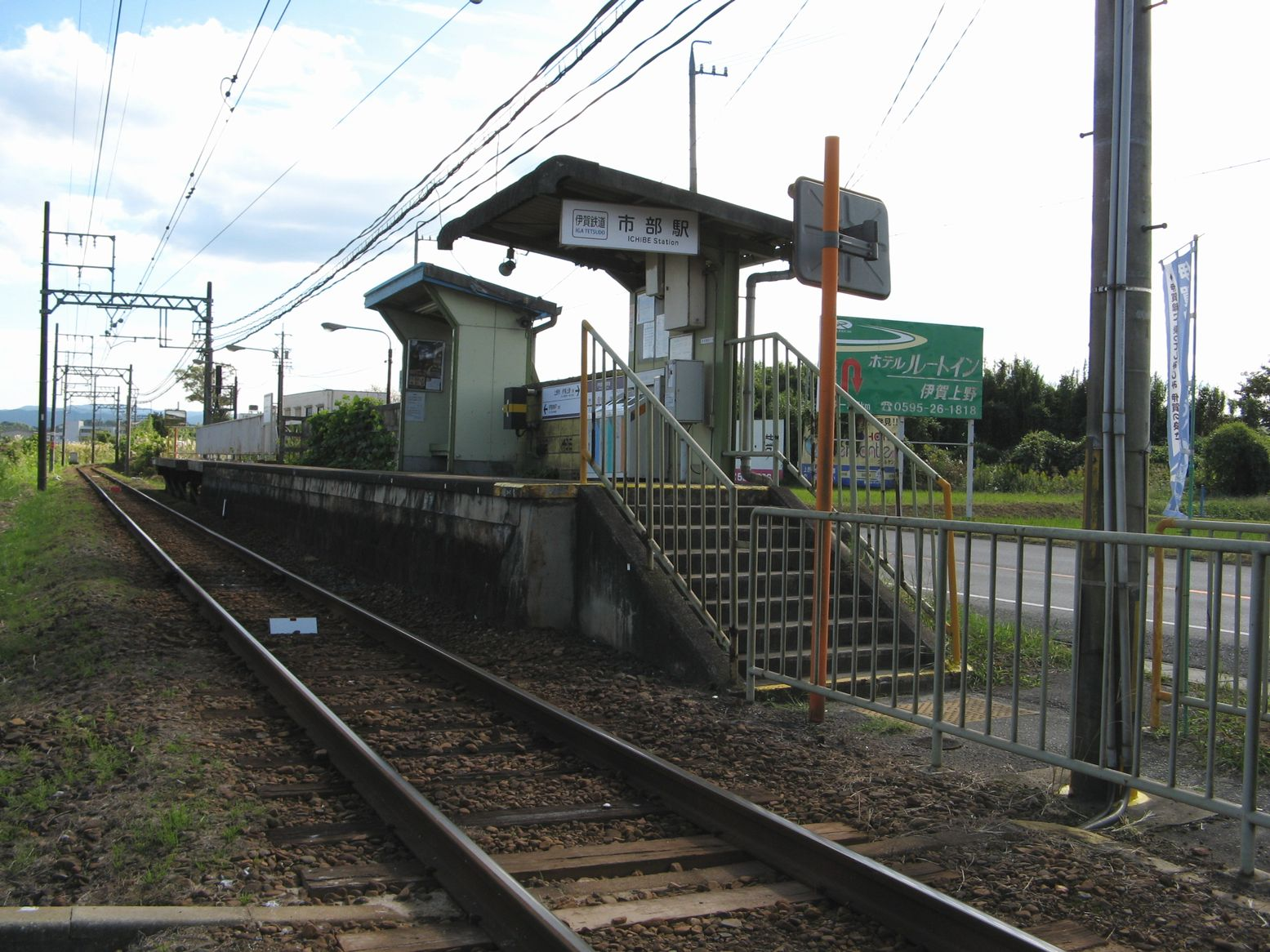
- Ichibe Station in October 2007

General information
- Location: Ichibe, Iga, Mie-ken 518-0102; Japan
- Coordinates: 34.7263°N 136.1484°E
- Line: ■ Iga Line
- Distance: 9.2 km from Iga-Ueno
- Platforms: 1 side platform

Other information
- Website: Official website

History
- Opened: May 25, 1926

Passengers
- FY2019: 105 daily
Location
- Location within Mie Prefecture Location within Japan

Ichibe Station (市部駅, Ichibe-eki) is a passenger railway station in located in the city of Iga, Mie Prefecture, Japan, operated by the private railway operator Iga Railway.

== Lines ==
Ichibe Station is served by the Iga Line, and is located 9.2 rail kilometers from the starting point of the line at Iga-Ueno Station.

== Station layout ==
The station consists of a single side platform serving bidirectional traffic. The station is unattended and has no station building. The platform is short and can only handle trains of two cars in length.

== Platform ==
1	■ Iga Line	For Iga-Ueno; For Iga-Kambe

== Adjacent stations ==
«	Service	»
Iga Line
Idamichi	-	Inako

== History ==
Ichibe Station was opened on May 25, 1926. Through a series of mergers, the Iga Line became part of the Kintetsu network by June 1, 1944, but was spun out as an independent company in October 2007. The station was closed from June 1, 1945 through October 21, 1947.

== Passenger statistics ==
In fiscal 2019, the station was used by an average of 105 passengers daily (boarding passengers only).

== Surrounding area ==
- Japan National Route 422
- Kizu River

== See also ==
- List of railway stations in Japan
