= Idamichi Station =

Railway station in Iga, Mie Prefecture, Japan

Idamichi Station 猪田道駅
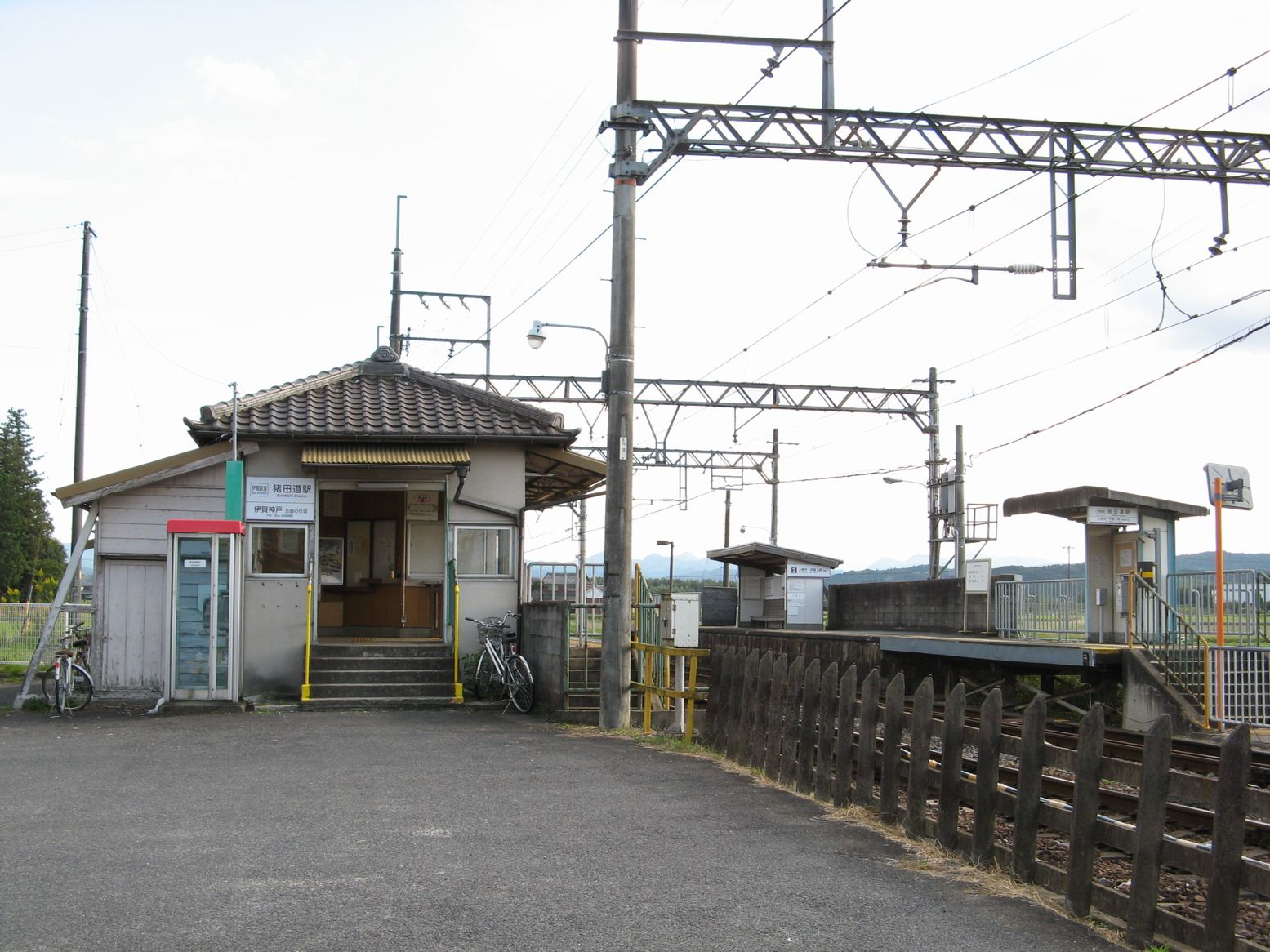
- Idamichi Station in October 2007

General information
- Location: Inagu, Iga-shi, Mie-ken 518-0101; Japan
- Coordinates: 34.7355°N 136.1403°E
- Operator: Iga Railway
- Line: ■ Iga Line
- Distance: 8.0 km from Iga-Ueno
- Platforms: 2 side platforms

Other information
- Website: Official website

History
- Opened: July 18, 1922

Passengers
- FY2019: 41 daily
Location
- Location within Mie Prefecture Location within Japan

Idamichi Station (猪田道駅, Idamichi-eki) is a passenger railway station in located in the city of Iga, Mie Prefecture, Japan, operated by the private railway operator Iga Railway.

== Lines ==
Idamichi Station is served by the Iga Line, and is located 8.0 rail kilometers from the starting point of the line at Iga-Ueno Station.

== Station layout ==
The station consists two opposed side platforms connected by a level crossing. The station is unattended and has no station building. The platform is short, and can only handle trains of two cars in length.

== Platform ==
| 1 | ■ Iga Line | for Iga-Kambe |
| 2 | ■ Iga Line | for Iga-Ueno, Uenoshi |

== Adjacent stations ==
| « | Service | » |
Iga Line
| Shijuku | - | Ichibe |

== History ==
Idamichi Station was opened on July 18, 1922. Through a series of mergers, the Iga Line became part of the Kintetsu network by June 1, 1944, but was spun out as an independent company in October 2007.

== Passenger statistics ==
In fiscal 2019, the station was used by an average of 41 passengers daily (boarding passengers only).

== Surrounding area ==
The surrounding area is the countryside. There is an intersection of Japan National Route 422 and Mie Prefectural Highway 688 in front of the station.

== See also ==
- List of railway stations in Japan
