= List of places of scenic beauty of Japan (Mie) =

This list is of the places of scenic beauty of Japan located within the Prefecture of Mie.

== National Places of Scenic Beauty ==
As of 1 July 2020, nine Places have been designated at a national level (including one *Special Place of Scenic Beauty); Dorohatchō spans the prefectural borders with Wakayama and Nara.

Site	Municipality	Comments	Image	Coordinates	Type	Ref.
*Dorohatchō 瀞八丁; Kitabatake-shi yakata ato teien	Kumano	also a designated Natural Monument; the designation includes areas of Shingū, Wakayama and Totsukawa, Nara		33°54′02″N 135°53′10″E	5, 6	
Former Moroto Family Gardens 旧諸戸氏庭園; Kyū-Moroto-shi teien	Kuwana			35°04′14″N 136°41′34″E	1	
Kumano Onigajō-Shishi Iwa 熊野の鬼ケ城附獅子巖; Kumano-no-Onigajō tsuketari Shishi-iwa	Kumano	also a designated Natural Monument		33°53′21″N 136°06′52″E	8	
Mitake Cherry Blossom 三多気のサクラ; Mitake no sakura	Tsu			34°31′04″N 136°13′19″E	3	
Moroto Family Gardens 諸戸氏庭園; Moroto-shi teien	Kuwana			35°04′12″N 136°41′33″E	1	
Jōnokoshi Site 城之越遺跡; Jōnokoshi iseki	Iga	also a designated Historic Site		34°40′47″N 136°09′48″E	1	
Akame Valley 赤目の峡谷; Akame-no-kyōkoku	Nabari			34°33′41″N 136°05′16″E	6	
Futami Bay 二見浦; Futami ura	Ise			34°30′35″N 136°47′19″E	8	
Kitabatake Family Residence Gardens 北畠氏館跡庭園; Kitabatake-shi yakata ato teien	Tsu			34°31′06″N 136°17′56″E	1	

== Prefectural Places of Scenic Beauty ==
As of 1 May 2019, thirteen Places have been designated at a prefectural level.

Site	Municipality	Comments	Image	Coordinates	Type	Ref.
Inō Jinja Gardens 伊奈冨神社庭園; Inō Jinja teien	Suzuka			34°50′14″N 136°33′08″E		
Mount Inō Rhododendra 稲生山の躑躅; Inō-yama no tsutsuji	Suzuka			34°50′14″N 136°33′08″E		
Senju-ji Gardens 専修寺庭園; Senjuji teien	Tsu			34°45′43″N 136°30′13″E		
Zuigan-ji Gardens 瑞巖寺庭園; Zuiganji teien	Matsusaka			34°34′21″N 136°27′37″E		
Mount Ise 伊勢山上; Ise-sanjō	Matsusaka			34°33′27″N 136°24′09″E		
Hōsen-ji Gardens 法泉寺庭園; Hōsenji teien	Taki			34°29′44″N 136°32′12″E		
Former Hasegawa Family Residence 長谷川氏旧宅; Hasegawa-shi kyū-taku	Matsusaka	also a Prefectural Historic Site		34°34′42″N 136°31′43″E		
Miya River Embankment 宮川堤; Miya-gawa tsutsumi	Ise			34°29′33″N 136°41′09″E		
Futami Bay 二見浦; Futami ura	Ise	largely dedesignated when Futami Bay was redesignated a National Place of Scenic Beauty, although part of the inn town remains a Prefectural Place of Scenic Beauty		34°30′30″N 136°46′49″E		
Mount Ōhira Rhododendra 大平山の躑躅; Ōhira-yama no tsutsuji	Taiki			34°16′47″N 136°24′26″E		
Minomushi-an 蓑虫庵; Minomushi-an	Iga	associated with Matsuo Bashō		34°45′35″N 136°07′49″E		
Tategasaki 楯ヶ崎; Tategasaki	Kumano			33°55′52″N 136°12′47″E		
Ōnigura 大丹倉; Ōnigura	Kumano			33°54′37″N 136°00′07″E		

== Municipal Places of Scenic Beauty ==
As of 1 May 2019, twelve Places have been designated at a municipal level.

== Registered Places of Scenic Beauty ==
As of 1 July 2020, one Monument has been registered (as opposed to designated) as a Place of Scenic Beauty at a national level.

Place	Municipality	Comments	Image	Coordinates	Type	Ref.
Yokoyama Family Gardens 横山氏庭園; Yokoyama-shi teien	Komono			35°00′36″N 136°30′24″E		

== See also ==
- Cultural Properties of Japan
- List of parks and gardens of Mie Prefecture
- List of Historic Sites of Japan (Mie)
- List of Cultural Properties of Japan – paintings (Mie)
