= Shinsei =

Shinsei may refer to:

- Shinsei (真正町), Gifu, a former town in Japan, now part of Motosu, Gifu
- SBI Shinsei Bank, a Japanese commercial bank
- Shinsei Shōnin (1443–1495), a priest of the Japanese Buddhist Tendai school
