= List of historic sites of Japan (Mie) =

Historic Sites Mie Prefecture (2021)

This list is of the historic sites of Japan located within the Prefecture of Mie.

== National Historic Sites ==
As of 1 January 2021, thirty-nine Sites have been designated as being of national significance (including one *Special Historic Site); Kumano Sanzan spans the prefectural borders with Wakayama and Kumano Sankeimichi spans the prefectural borders with both Wakayama and Nara.

Site	Municipality	Comments	Image	Coordinates	Type	Ref.
*Motoori Norinaga Former Residence and Residence Site 本居宣長旧宅 同 宅跡 Motoori Norinaga kyū-taku dō taku ato	Matsusaka	former home of Edo period kokugaku scholar	Motoori Norinaga Former Residence and Residence Site	34°34′44″N 136°31′45″E	8	1491
Azaka Castle ruins 阿坂城跡 附 高城跡 枳城跡 Azaka-jō ato tsuketari Taka-jō ato Karatachi-jō ato	Matsusaka	Muromachi period castle ruins	Azaka Castle	34°35′43″N 136°27′16″E	2	1536
Iga Kokuchō ruins 伊賀国庁跡 Iga kokuchō ato	Iga	Nara/Heian period government complex	Iga Kokucho ruins	34°48′09″N 136°09′28″E	2	00003643
Iga Kokubun-ji ruins 伊賀国分寺跡 Iga Kokubunji ato	Iga	Nara/Heian period provincial temple of Iga Province	Iga Kokubunji ruins	34°45′30″N 136°09′14″E	3	00003440
Ise Kokufu ruins 伊勢国府跡 Ise kokufu ato	Suzuka	Nara/Heian period government complex	Ise Kokufu ruins	34°53′03″N 136°29′50″E	2	3322
Ise Kokubun-ji ruins 伊勢国分寺跡 Ise kokubunji ato	Suzuka	Nara/Heian period provincial temple of Ise Province	Ise Kokubunji ruins	34°54′32″N 136°33′51″E	3	1492
Ōzuka Kofun 王塚古墳 Ōzuka kofun	Suzuka	Kofun period tumulus		34°51′06″N 136°29′27″E	1	1528
Natsumi Haiji ruins 夏見廃寺跡 Natsumi haiji ato	Nabari	Asuka period temple ruins	Natsumi Haiji ruins	34°37′19″N 136°06′40″E	3	1538
Kurube Kanga ruins 久留倍官衙遺跡 Kurube kanga iseki	Yokkaichi	Nara/Heian period government complex		35°00′53″N 136°38′00″E	2	00003503
Former Sūkōdō 旧崇広堂 kyū-Sūkōdō	Iga	Edo period han school	Sūkōdō	34°46′04″N 136°07′32″E	4	1504
Former Toyomiyazaki Bunko 旧豊宮崎文庫 kyū-Toyomiyazaki Bunko	Ise	Edo Period library assisted with Ise Grand Shrine	Former Toyomiyazaki Bunko	34°29′06″N 136°42′33″E	4	1497
Former Hayashizaki Bunko 旧林崎文庫 kyū-Hayashizaki Bunko	Ise	Edo Period library assisted with Ise Grand Shrine	Former Hayashizaki Bunko	34°27′34″N 136°43′16″E	4	1523
Mihakayama Kofun 御墓山古墳 Mihakayama kofun	Iga	Kofun period tumulus	Mihakayama Kofun	34°48′07″N 136°10′24″E	1	1490
Mukaiyama Kofun 向山古墳 Mukaiyama kofun	Matsusaka	Kofun period tumulus	Mukaiyama Kofun	34°36′41″N 136°28′09″E	1	1530
Saikū Site 斎宮跡 Saikū ato	Meiwa	Heian period palace ruins	Saikū Site	34°32′30″N 136°36′36″E	2	1533
Matsusaka Castle ruins 松坂城跡 Matsusaka-jō ato	Matsusaka	Sengoku/Edo period Castle	Matsusaka Castle	34°34′33″N 136°31′33″E	2	00003702
Iga Ueno Castle 上野城跡 Ueno-jō ato	Iga	Edo period castle	Ueno Castle	34°46′14″N 136°07′41″E	2	1527
Jōnokoshi Site 城之越遺跡 Jōnokoshi iseki	Iga	also a Place of Scenic Beauty	Jōnokoshi Site	34°40′47″N 136°09′48″E	1, 3	1540
Mizuike Pottery Kiln ruins 水池土器製作遺跡 Mizuike doki seisaku iseki	Meiwa	Nara period pottery kiln ruins		34°31′46″N 136°38′13″E	1, 6	1531
Shōbō-ji Sansō ruins 正法寺山荘跡 Shōbōji sansō ato	Kameyama	Sengoku period fortified villa ruins		34°51′57″N 136°23′26″E	2, 3	1534
Akagi Castle ruins and Tabirako Pass Execution Grounds 赤木城跡及び田平子峠刑場跡 Akagi-jō ato oyobi Tabirako-tōge keijō ato	Kumano	Sengoku period castle ruins	Akagi Castle ruins and Tabirako Pass Execution Grounds	33°53′46″N 135°57′06″E	2	1537
Tage Kitabatakeshi Jōkan Site 多気北畠氏城館跡 北畠氏館跡 霧山城跡 Tage Kitabatake-shi jōkan ato Kitabatake-shi yakata ato Kiriyama-jō ato	Tsu	designation includes the sites of the Kitabatake Family Residence and Kiriyama Castle	Tage Kitabataka Family Fortified Residence Site, Kitabatake Family Fortified Residence Site, Kiriyama Castle Site	34°31′06″N 136°17′56″E	2, 8	1514
Tanikawa Kotosuga Former Residence 谷川士清旧宅 Tanikawa Kotosuga kyū-taku	Tsu	Edo period kokugaku scholar	Tanikawa Kotosuga Former Residence	34°43′18″N 136°29′30″E	8	1526
Tanikawa Kotosuga Grave 谷川士清墓 Tanikawa Kotosuga no haka	Tsu	Edo period kokugaku scholar grave		34°43′21″N 136°29′35″E	7	1520
Asamayama Sutra Mounds 朝熊山経塚群 Asamayama kyōzuka-gun	Ise	Heian period sutra mounds at Kongōshō-ji temple	Asamayama Sutra Mounds	34°27′29″N 136°47′02″E	3	1525
Chōrakusan temple ruins 長楽山廃寺跡 Chōrakusan haiji ato	Iga	Nara/Heian period temple ruins	Chōrakusan Haiji ruins	34°45′28″N 136°09′27″E	3	1496
Nagano Castle ruins 長野氏城跡 Nagano-shi shiro ato	Tsu	Kamakura/Nanboku-cho castle ruins	Nagano Family Castle ruins	34°44′50″N 136°20′26″E	2	1535
Tenpaku Site 天白遺跡 Tenpaku iseki	Matsusaka	Jomon period settlement trace		34°36′39″N 136°26′20″E	1	3249
Haifudaraku-ji Chōseki stele 廃補陀落寺町石 Haifudarakuji chōseki	Iga	Kamakura period milestones	Haifudarakuji Chōseki stele	34°47′31″N 136°05′38″E	3	1508
Mihata Kofun Cluster 美旗古墳群 Mihata kofun-gun	Nabari	Kofun period tumuli	Mihata Kofun Cluster	34°39′43″N 136°08′04″E	1	1532
Takarazuka Kofun 宝塚古墳 Takarazuka kofun	Matsusaka	Kofun period tumulus	Takarazuka Kofun	34°32′59″N 136°30′55″E	1	1505
Grave of Motoori Norinaga (Mount Yamamuro) 本居宣長墓（山室山） Motoori Norinaga no haka (Yamamuro-yama)	Matsusaka	Edo period kokugaku scholar grave		34°31′28″N 136°30′12″E	7	1512
Graves of Motoori Norinaga and Motoori Haruniwa 本居宣長墓（樹敬寺）附 本居春庭墓 Motoori Norinaga no haka (Jukyōji)	Matsusaka	Edo period graves of Motoori clan at Jukyō-ji temple	Motoori Norinaga Grave (Jukyōji) and Motoori Haruniwa Grave	34°34′20″N 136°31′53″E	7	1513
Akeai Kofun 明合古墳 Akeai kofun	Tsu	Kofun period tumulus	Akeai Kofun	34°46′03″N 136°26′23″E	1	1522
Nomura Ichirizuka 野村一里塚 Nomura ichirizuka	Kameyama	Edo period highway milestone	Nomura Ichirizuka	34°51′26″N 136°26′14″E	6	1509
Rikyū-in ruins 離宮院跡 Rikyū-in ato	Ise	Nara/Heian period palace ruin	Rikyū-in ruins	34°30′08″N 136°40′20″E	2, 3	1499
Kumano Sanzan 熊野三山 Kumano sanzan	Kihō	designation includes areas of Shingū, Tanabe and Nachikatsuura in Wakayama Prefecture	Kumano Sanzan	33°43′37″N 135°58′55″E	3	3364
Kumano Sankeimichi 熊野参詣道 Kumano sankeimichi	Kumano, Owase, Taiki, Kihoku, Mihama, Kihō	trails inscribed on the UNESCO World Heritage List among the Sacred Sites and Pilgrimage Routes in the Kii Mountain Range; designation includes the Nakahechi (中辺路), Ōhechi (大辺路), Kohechi (小辺路), Iseji (伊勢路), Kumano River, Shichirimi-hama (七里御浜), and Hano-no-Iwa (花の窟) and areas of Shingū, Tanabe and Nachikatsuura, Shirahama, Susami, and Kōya in Wakayama Prefecture and areas of Nosegawa and Totsukawa in Nara Prefecture	Kumano Sankeimichi	33°54′06″N 135°48′11″E	3, 6	3269
Suzuka Barrier ruins 鈴鹿関跡 Suzuka no seki ato	Kameyama	Nara period barrier on the Tokaido		34°51′27″N 136°22′54″E	4	00004114

== Prefectural Historic Sites ==
As of 1 May 2020, seventy-four Sites have been designated as being of prefectural importance.

Site	Municipality	Comments	Image	Coordinates	Type	Ref.
Moroto Reservoir Site 諸戸水道貯水池遺構 附 図面; Moroto suidō chosuichi ikō tsuketari zumen	Kuwana	designation includes plans		35°03′48″N 136°40′42″E		
Kuwana Castle ruins 桑名城跡; Kuwana-jō ato	Kuwana	in Kyūka Park (九華公園)		35°03′53″N 136°41′55″E		
Shichiri no Watashi Old Port 七里の渡; Shichiri no watashi	Kuwana	ferry site between Miya-juku and Kuwana-juku		35°04′05″N 136°41′48″E		
Numanami Rōzan Grave and Nunami Family Grave Site 沼波弄山墓附沼波家墓所; Numanami Rōzan haka tsuketari Nunami-ke bosho	Kuwana	3 graves at Kōtoku-ji (光徳寺)		35°03′30″N 136°41′25″E		
Matsudaira Sadatsuna and Family Grave Site 松平定綱及一統之墓所; Matsudaira Sadatsuna oyobi Ittō no bosho	Kuwana	at Shōgen-ji (照源寺)		35°04′10″N 136°40′45″E		
Yamato Takeru Ozusaki Site 日本武尊尾津前御遺蹟; Yamato Takeru no mikoto Ozusaki on’iseki	Kuwana	at Kusanagi Shrine (草薙神社)		35°06′51″N 136°37′54″E		
Ise Ankoku-ji ruins 伊勢安国寺跡; Ise Ankokuji iseki	Yokkaichi			34°57′19″N 136°35′11″E		
Hiro Kofun Cluster A 広古墳Ａ群; Hiro kofun A-gun	Yokkaichi			35°02′07″N 136°36′52″E		
Sugitani Site 杉谷遺跡; Sugitani iseki	Komono			35°03′39″N 136°29′42″E		
Dainichi-dō Precinct 500 Arhats 大日堂境内の五百羅漢; Dainichi-dō keidai no gohyaku rakan	Komono			35°02′55″N 136°30′59″E		
Tachibana Moribe Birthplace Site 橘守部誕生地遺跡; Tachibana Moribe tanjō-chi iseki	Asahi			35°02′06″N 136°39′48″E		
Chigusa Castle ruins 千種城跡; Chigusa-jō ato	Komono			35°01′57″N 136°29′11″E		
Emperor Temmu Tō River Worship Site 天武天皇迹太川御遥拝所跡; Tenmu tennō Tō-gawa go-yōhaisho ato	Yokkaichi			35°02′07″N 136°36′52″E		
Tomida Ichirizuka Site 富田の一里塚跡; Tomida no ichizuka ato	Yokkaichi			35°00′36″N 136°39′03″E		
Nao Haiji 縄生廃寺; Nao haiji	Asahi			35°02′42″N 136°39′49″E		
Hinaga Ichirizuka Site 日永一里塚跡; Hinaga ichizuka ato	Yokkaichi			34°56′47″N 136°36′07″E		
Hinaga Oiwake 日永の追分; Hinaga no oiwake	Yokkaichi			34°56′08″N 136°35′54″E		
Yūsetsu Banko Kiln Site 有節萬古窯跡; Yūsetsu banko-yō ato	Asahi	Banko ware		35°02′18″N 136°39′40″E		
Ishiyakushi Ichirizuka Site 石薬師の一里塚跡; Ishiyakushi no ichirizuka ato	Suzuka			34°53′42″N 136°32′53″E		
Kabuto Castle ruins 鹿伏兎城跡; Kabuto-jō ato	Kameyama			34°50′39″N 136°20′15″E		
Kanbe Castle ruins 神戸城跡; Kanbe-jō ato	Suzuka			34°52′47″N 136°34′38″E		
Kanbe Approach 神戸の見付; Kanbe mitsuke	Suzuka			34°53′20″N 136°34′56″E		
Former Kameyama Castle Tamon-yagura 旧亀山城多門楼 kyū-Kameyama-jō Tamon-rō	Kameyama			34°51′22″N 136°27′02″E		
Kyōrin-dō ruins 教倫堂跡; Kyōrindō ato	Suzuka			34°52′44″N 136°34′45″E		
Shiratorizuka Kofun 白鳥塚古墳; Shiratorizuka kofun	Suzuka			34°54′05″N 136°31′33″E		
Higashi Oiwake - Nishi Oiwake 東の追分・西の追分; Higashi no oiwake・Nishi no oiwake	Kameyama			34°51′22″N 136°22′53″E		
Mine Castle ruins 峯城跡; Mine-jō ato	Kameyama			34°53′46″N 136°27′52″E		
Ujii Weir 雲林院井堰; Ujii iseki	Tsu			34°48′30″N 136°23′34″E		
Kanbe Dōtaku Excavation Site 神戸銅鐸発掘地; Kanbe dōtaku hakkutsu-chi	Tsu			34°42′25″N 136°28′56″E		
Kōjo Tose Grave 孝女登勢墓; Kōjo Tose haka	Tsu			34°44′54″N 136°27′01″E		
Kōchō Memorial Monuments 弘長供養碑及附属供養碑; Kōchō kuyōhi oyobi fuzoku kuyōhi	Tsu	twelve stone grave monuments at Shinpuku-in (真福院)		34°31′17″N 136°13′08″E		
Shinsei Shōnin Birthplace 真盛上人誕生地; Shinsei Shōnin tanjō-chi	Tsu			34°38′51″N 136°23′59″E		
Tsu Castle ruins 津城跡; Tsu-jō ato	Tsu			34°43′04″N 136°30′31″E		
Taira Clan Legendary Origins Site 平氏発祥伝説地; Hei-shi hasshō den-setsu-chi	Tsu			34°43′09″N 136°27′10″E		
Matsusaka Castle ruins 松坂城跡; Matsusaka-jō ato	Matsusaka			34°34′33″N 136°31′33″E		
Ise-dera ruins 伊勢寺跡; Ise-dera ato	Matsusaka			34°34′13″N 136°28′50″E		
Okawachi Castle ruins 大河内城跡; Okawachi-jō ato	Matsusaka			34°31′37″N 136°28′23″E		
Kayumi Ijiri Site 粥見井尻遺跡; Kayumi Ijiri iseki	Matsusaka			34°27′19″N 136°23′54″E		
Kitabatake Tomonori Mise Fortified Residence Site 北畠具教三瀬館跡; Kitabatake Tomonori Mise yakata ato	Ōdai			34°24′24″N 136°25′04″E		
Kubo Kofun 久保古墳; Kubo kofun	Matsusaka			34°33′09″N 136°32′25″E		
Sakakura Site 坂倉遺跡; Sakakura iseki	Taki			34°30′40″N 136°34′27″E		
Sakamoto Kofun Cluster 坂本古墳群; Sakamoto kofun-gun	Meiwa			34°33′03″N 136°37′06″E		
Tsukimoto Oiwake 月本追分; Tsukimoto Oiwake	Matsusaka			34°37′44″N 136°30′34″E		
Matsugashima Castle ruins 松ヶ島城跡; Matsugashima-jō ato	Matsusaka			34°36′19″N 136°31′57″E		
Mise Stronghold Site 三瀬砦跡; Mise toride ato	Ōdai			34°24′03″N 136°25′33″E		
Kuki Yoshitaka Grave 九鬼嘉隆墓; Kuki Yoshitaka haka	Toba			34°31′15″N 136°54′07″E		
Ōuchiyama Ichirizuka 大内山の一里塚; Ōuchiyama no ichirizuka	Taiki			34°16′43″N 136°21′42″E		
Ojoka Kofun おじょか古墳; Ojoka kofun	Shima			34°18′40″N 136°53′20″E		
Former Koshika Village Storehouse 旧越賀村郷蔵 kyū-Koshika-mura gōgura	Shima			34°15′23″N 136°47′36″E		
Gokasho Castle ruins 五ヶ所城跡附愛州氏居館跡及墳墓; Gokasho-jō ato tsuketari Aisu-shi kyokan ato oyobi funbo	Minamiise	designation includes the Aisu Clan Residence and Graves		34°21′19″N 136°42′08″E		
Sakate Village Battery Site 坂手村砲台跡; Sakate-mura hōdai ato	Toba			34°29′18″N 136°51′06″E		
Shima Kokubun-ji ruins 志摩国分寺跡; Shima Kokubunji ato	Shima	provincial temple of Shima province		34°20′55″N 136°52′48″E		
Tamaru Castle ruins 田丸城跡; Tamaru-jō ato	Tamaki			34°29′25″N 136°37′41″E		
Toba Castle ruins 鳥羽城跡; Toba-jō ato	Toba			34°28′51″N 136°50′41″E		
Hamajima Kofun 浜島古墳; Hamajima kofun	Shima			34°18′02″N 136°45′01″E		
Ida Jinja Kofun 猪田神社古墳附古井; Ida Jinja kofun tsuketari koi	Iga	designation includes the old well		34°42′55″N 136°08′34″E		
Kagiya no Tsuji 鍵屋の辻; Kagiya no Tsuji	Iga			34°46′02″N 136°07′13″E		
Former Reitakusha 旧麗澤舎 kyū-Reitakusha	Iga			34°50′30″N 136°14′29″E		
Kurumazuka 車塚; Kurumazuka	Iga			34°46′00″N 136°10′36″E		
Kotohirayama Kofun 琴平山古墳; Kotohirayama kofun	Nabari			34°35′37″N 136°05′08″E		
Sairen-ji Memorial Tō 西蓮寺の供養塔; Sairenji no kuyōtō	Iga	three tō		34°45′35″N 136°06′22″E		
Jionji Kofun 寺音寺古墳; Jionji kofun	Iga			34°46′29″N 136°12′35″E		
Jōnokoshi Site 城之越遺跡; Jōnokoshi iseki	Iga			34°40′44″N 136°09′45″E		
Shinsei-byō 真盛廟; Shinsei-byō	Iga	at Sairen-ji (西蓮寺)		34°45′34″N 136°06′21″E		
Tōdō Takahisa Grave Site 藤堂高久公墓所; Tōdō Takahisa kōbosho	Iga			34°46′10″N 136°05′24″E		
Nabari Tōdō Clan Residence Site 名張藤堂家邸跡; Nabari Tōdō-ke tei ato	Nabari			34°37′21″N 136°05′28″E		
Fukuchi Castle ruins 福地城跡; Fukuchi-jō ato	Iga			34°50′10″N 136°14′51″E		
Hō-ji ruins 鳳凰寺跡; Hōji ato	Iga			34°45′57″N 136°13′31″E		
Ryōzan Sanchō Site 霊山山頂遺跡; Ryōzan sanchō iseki	Iga			34°49′02″N 136°15′39″E		
Suishadani Mining Site 水車谷鉱山跡; Suishadani kōzan ato	Kumano			33°49′41″N 135°52′51″E		
Nigishima Ichirizuka 二木島の一里塚; Nigishima no ichirizuka	Kumano			33°56′23″N 136°10′48″E		

== Municipal Historic Sites ==
As of 1 May 2020, a further two hundred and twenty Sites have been designated as being of municipal importance.

== Registered Historic Sites ==
As of 1 January 2021, one Monument has been registered (as opposed to designated) as an Historic Site at a national level.

Site	Municipality	Comments	Image	Coordinates	Type	Ref.
Tachibai Irrigation Channel 立梅用水; Tachibai yōsui	Matsusaka, Taki			34°29′46″N 136°32′46″E		

== See also ==
- Cultural Properties of Japan
- Ise, Shima, Iga, Kii Provinces
- List of Places of Scenic Beauty of Japan (Mie)
- List of Cultural Properties of Japan - paintings (Mie)
- List of Cultural Properties of Japan - historical materials (Mie)
- Mie Prefectural Museum
