= Mukaiyama Kofun =

Kofun burial mound in Matsusaka, Japan

- 向山古墳 (Japanese)
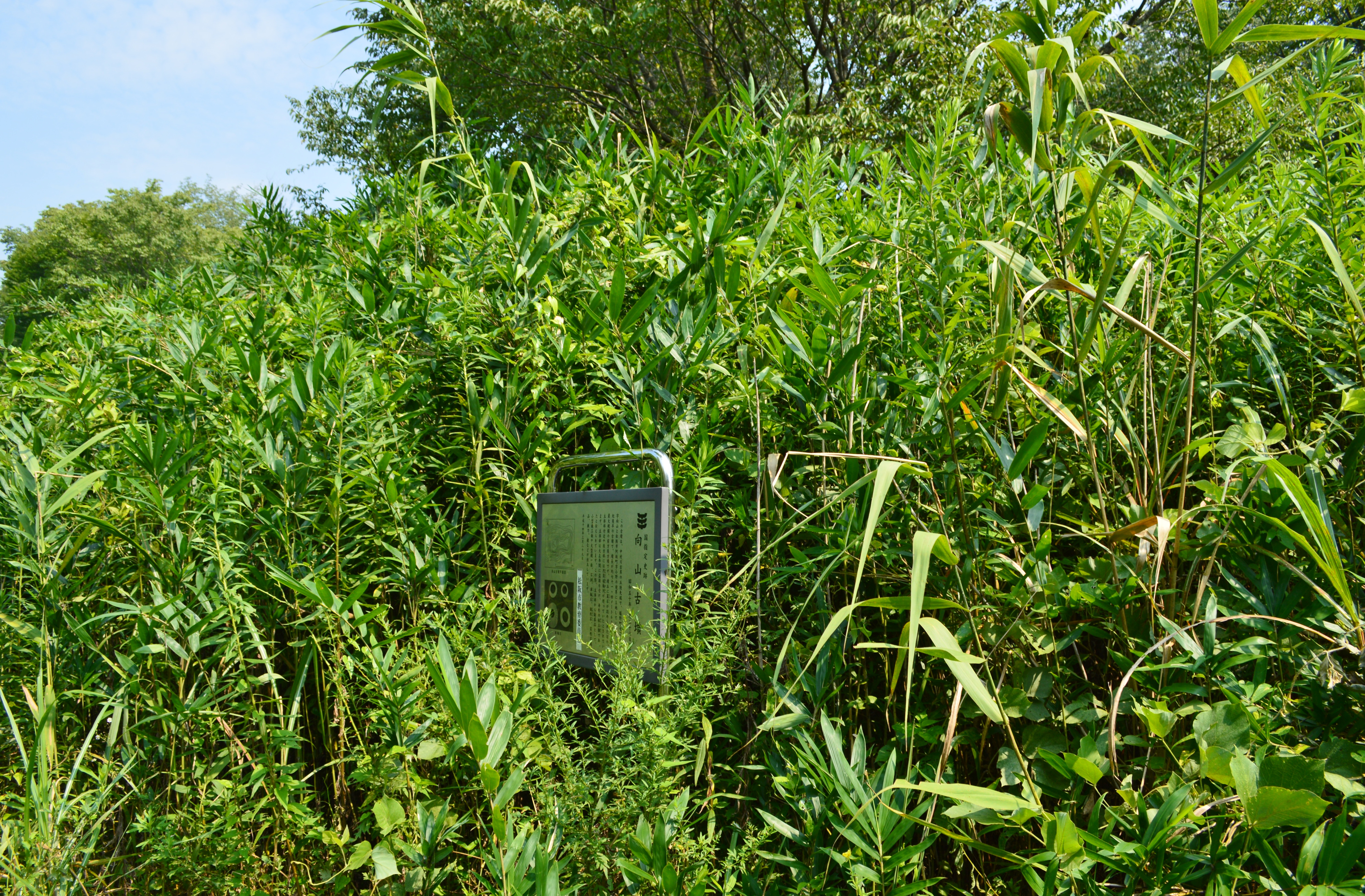
- Mukaiyama Kofun

- Mukaiyama Kofun Mukaiyama Kofun (Japan)
- 34°36′42.98″N 136°28′11.53″E
- Type: Kofun
- Periods: Kofun period
- Location: Matsusaka, Mie, Japan
- Region: Kansai region

Site notes
- Area: 16,219 m^{2} (174,580 sq ft)
- Public access: Yes

The Mukaiyama Kofun (向山古墳) is a kofun burial mound located in between the Ōno and the Ureshino-Ueno neighborhoods of the city of Matsusaka, Mie Prefecture in the Kansai region of Japan. It was designated a National Historic Site of Japan in 1975.

== Overview ==
The Mukaiyama Kofun is located at the end of a low hill with an elevation of 50 meters on the south bank of the Kumozu River in central Mie Prefecture. It is a "two conjoined rectangles" type tumulus (zenpō-kōhō-fun (前方後方墳)). It is oriented east-to-west, with the front facing east, and has a total length of 82 meters. The tumulus was constructed in two tiers, and fukiishi and fragments of clay pottery have been found scattered around the mound, but no haniwa. The burial chamber is located in the posterior portion and intersects the main axis of the tumulus at an angle. It was excavated by the local landlord in 1914 and was found to contain a clay coffin. Grave goods, including three bronze mirrors, iron swords and spearheads, and tubular beads and wheel stones made from jasper, were discovered. These artifacts are stored at the Tokyo National Museum and are estimated to date from the latter half of the 4th century, in the early Kofun period. The tumulus is located about 10 minutes by car from Ise-Nakagawa Station on the Kintetsu Osaka Line.

The surrounding area contains a number of large kofun from the same period, including the Takarazuka Kofun, which are distributed around Mount Asaka.

A portion of the tumulus collapsed in 1973 due to the removal of topsoil, and it received protection as a National Historic Site in 1975.

- Overall length: 82.2 meters
- Overall height: 10 meters
- Posterior rectangular portion: 40.0 meters long x 46 meters wide x 6.0 meters high
- Anterior circular portion: 35.4 meters long x 36.4 meters wide x 5.6 meters high

== See also ==
- List of Historic Sites of Japan (Mie)
