= Akagi Castle =

Protected Japanese castle in Kumano, Mie prefecture

- 赤木城
- Kumano, Mie, Japan
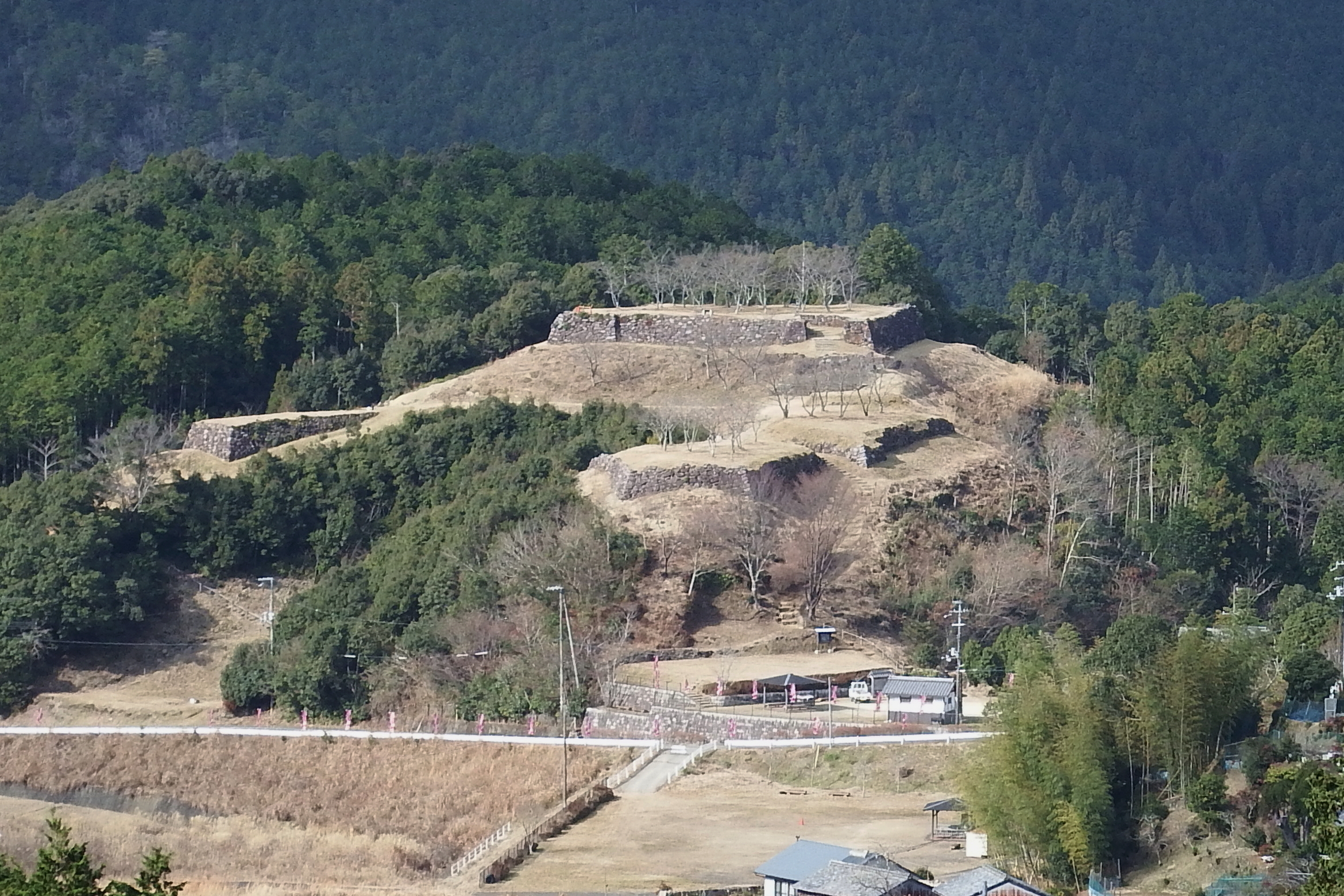
- Akagi ruins

Site information
- Type: hirayama-style Japanese castle
- Controlled by: Tōdō clan, Asano clan
- Condition: Ruins

Location
- Location within Mie Prefecture Location within Japan
- Coordinates: 33°53′46″N 135°57′06″E

Site history
- Built: 1589

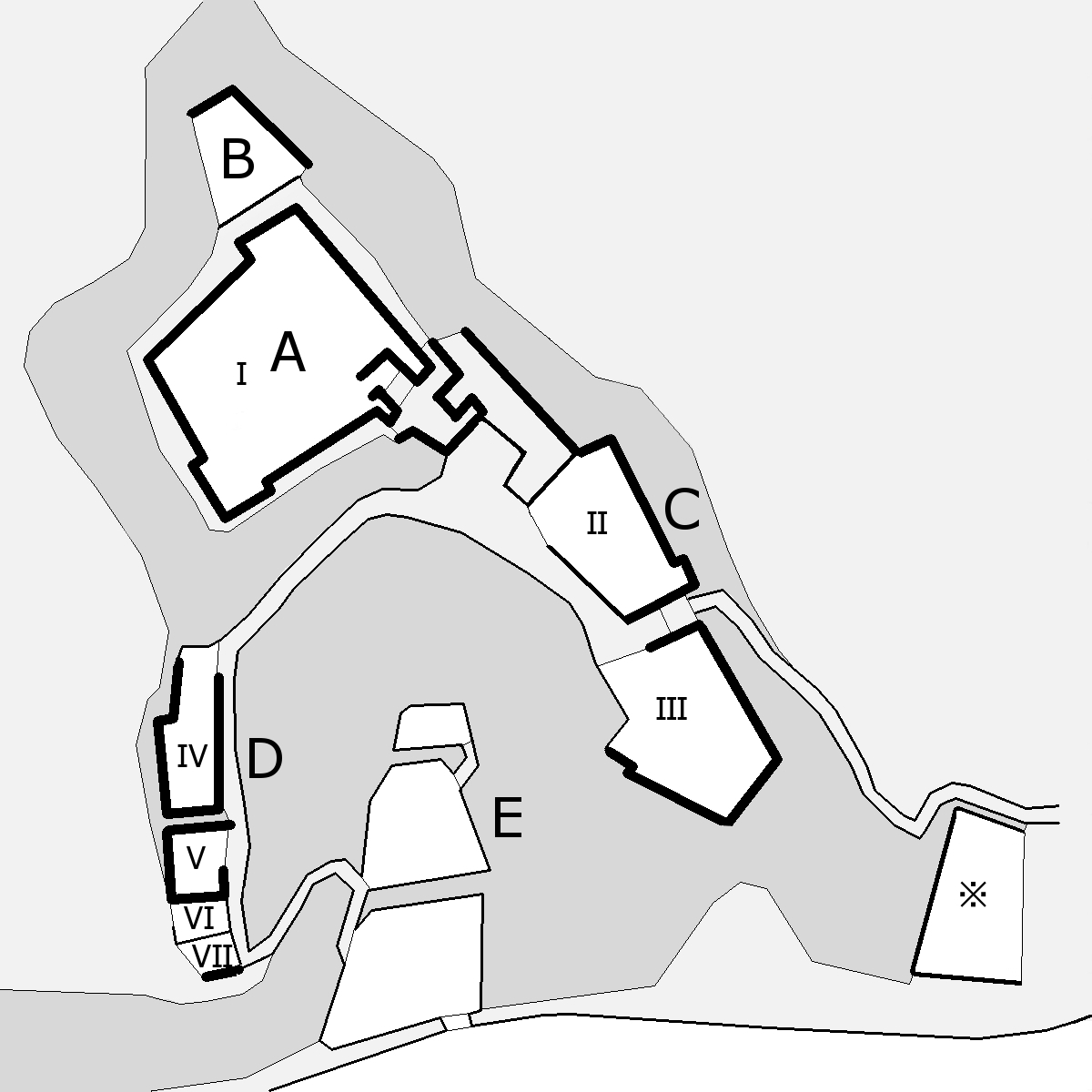
Layout of Akagi Castle

Akagi Castle (赤木城, Akagi-jō) was a Sengoku period hirayama-style Japanese castle located in the Kiwa neighborhood of the city of Kumano, Mie prefecture. Its ruins have been protected as a National Historic Site since 1989.

== Overview ==
Akagi Castle is located in the hills of former Muro District of Kii Province in the western part of the city of Kumano, at an elevation of 230 meters, with a relative height of 30-40 meters above its surroundings. The area is a small basin surrounded by the Kii Mountains on an ancient route connecting the Ise Shrine with the Kumano Shrines. The castle was originally constructed by Tōdō Takatora to suppress a local rebellion around 1589 and consists of a series of three curved embankments surrounding the inner bailey at the top of the hill. This arrangement is the typical format used by Sengoku period and previous mountain notifications; however, the castle also incorporated more modern developments, such as stone walls and fortified gateways.

== History ==
From the Nanboku-chō period, the southern Kii Peninsula was the location of constant conflict between many petty warlords. Toyotomi Hideyoshi invaded the region in 1585 and assigned it to the control of his brother Toyotomi Hidenaga, who attempted to rule from Wakayama Castle. Hidenaga attempted to conduct a survey of the territory the following year, which was immediately opposed by all local warlords who rose in revolt. This was known as the "Kitayama Ikki" and involved thousands of local inhabitants. The rebels were quickly defeated by Hidenaga's forces; however, Hidenaga refused the surrender of the rebel remnants and ordered his army to resume the campaign the following spring, showing no mercy, but his plans to completely crush the rebels was postponed when most of his forces were called away for Hideyoshi's invasion of Kyūshū. Hidenaga ordered Tōdō Takatora to construct Akagi Castle as a base of operations, and in May 1589, beheaded a large number of rebellious farmers at Tabirako Pass. It later was revealed that the purpose of the survey was to enable Hidenaga's general Yoshikawa Heisuke to fell over 20,000 trees from Kumano, which were then sold in Osaka for great profit. An outraged Hideyoshi ordered Yoshikawa's execution, and Hidenaga fell from favor. However, Hideyoshi realized the value of Kumano timber, and Akagi Castle continued to be a center for the exploitation of this resource. Tōdō Takatora remained at Akagi for about 10 years, and was transferred to Uwajima Castle on Hideyoshi's orders in 1595.

The castle was later awarded to Asano Nagaakira, a retainer of Tokugawa Ieyasu, after the Battle of Sekigahara. During the Siege of Osaka, when many of his forces were away with the Tokugawa armies, the local inhabitants rose in revolt again at the instigation of Toyotomi Hideyori. Asano was forced to return to crush the rebellion, and executed 363 rebels at the Tabirako Pass. The execution site was included in the National Historic Site designation, and a memorial tower was constructed in 1968. The Asano clan was awarded Wakayama Domain in 1613, and in line with the Tokugawa shogunate's regulations on "one castle per domain", Akagi Castle was allowed to fall into ruin.

The Akagi Castle ruins were extensively excavated and renovated from 1992 to 2004. After the ruins were featured in a television program in 2015, and photos of the castle ruins in a sea of fog were published, the site has received large numbers of visitors. The castle was listed as one of the Continued Top 100 Japanese Castles in 2017.

== See also ==
- List of Historic Sites of Japan (Mie)

== Literature ==
- De Lange, William (2021). An Encyclopedia of Japanese Castles. Groningen: Toyo Press. pp. 600 pages. ISBN 978-9492722300.
