= Iga Kokuchō ruins =

Archeological site

Iga Provincial Capital ruins
- 伊賀国庁跡 (Japanese)
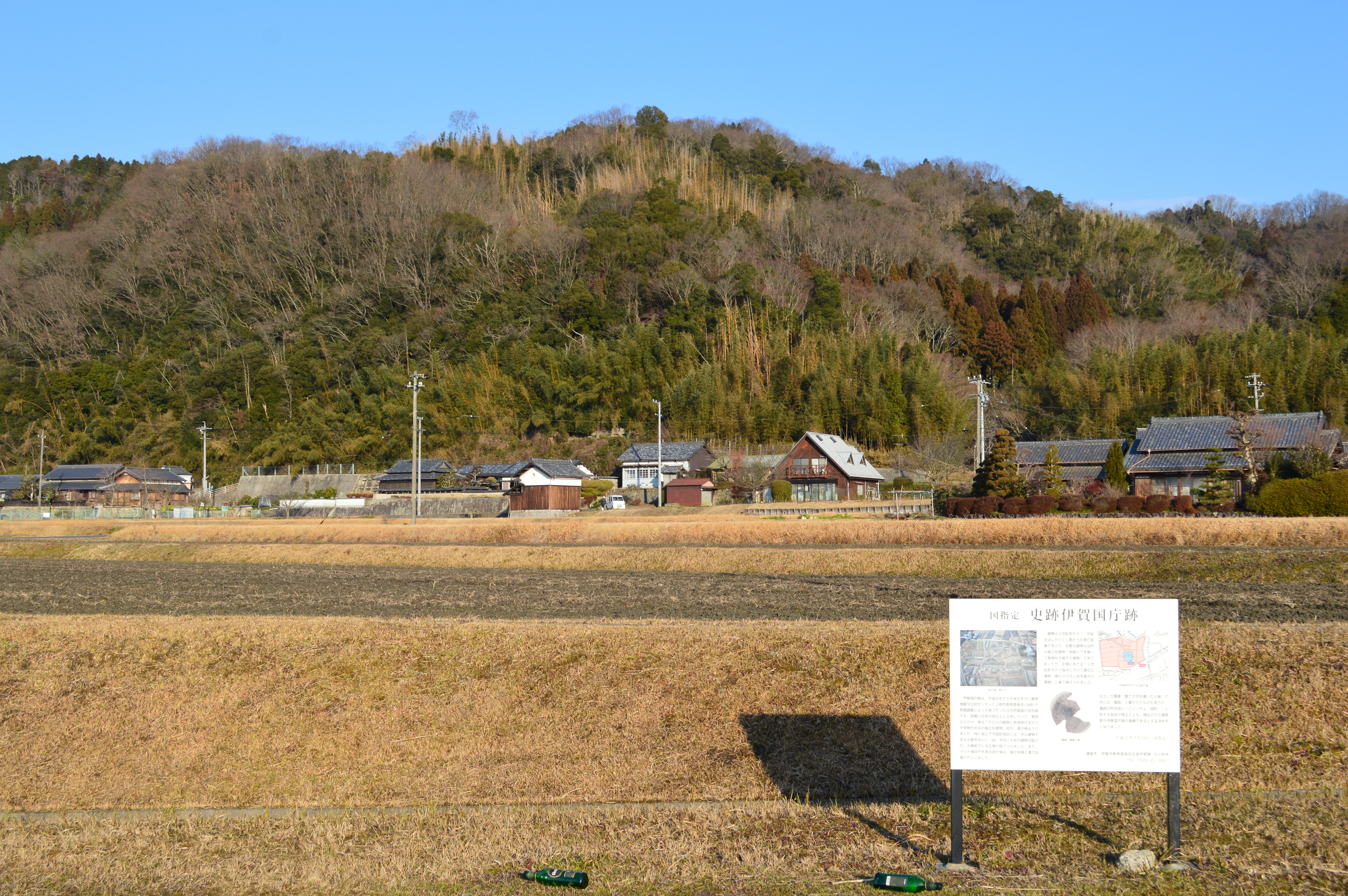
- Iga Provincial Capital ruins

- Iga Provincial Capital ruins Iga Kokuchō ruins (Japan)
- 34°48′09″N 136°09′28″E
- Periods: Nara - Heian period
- Location: Iga, Mie, Japan
- Region: Kansai region

Site notes
- Area: 30,586.17 m^{2} (329,226.8 sq ft)
- Public access: Yes (no public facilities)

The Iga Provincial Capital ruins (伊賀国庁跡, Iga kokuchō ato) is an archaeological site with the ruins of a Nara to Heian period government administrative complex located in the Sakanoshita neighborhood of the city of Iga, Mie prefecture in the Kansai region of Japan. Identified as the ruins of the kokufu (provincial capital) of Iga Province, the site has been protected as a National Historic Site from 2009.

== Overview ==
In the late Nara period, after the establishment of a centralized government under the Ritsuryō system, local rule over the provinces was standardized under a kokufu (provincial capital), and each province was divided into smaller administrative districts, known as (郡, gun, kōri), composed of 2–20 townships in 715 AD. The kokufu complex contained the official residence and offices of the kokushi, the official sent from the central government as provincial governor, along with buildings housing offices concerned with general administration, farming, finance, police and military. In the periphery there was a provincial school (kokugaku), the garrison and storehouses for taxes.

The Iga Provincial Capital ruins are located on the fluvial terrace of the Tsuge River, a tributary of the Kizu River. The site is adjacent to the confluence of the three rivers, with the route of the ancient Tōkaidō highway a short distance to the south. The actual location had bene lost for several centuries. Despite the perseverance of place names such as "Fuchu" and "Kokufu Minato" indicating that the site was in this general vicinity, few Nara period or Heian period artifacts had been found.. The ruins were rediscovered only in 1988 in conjunction with field improvement works. The site measures 200 meters from east-to-west by 150 meters from north-to-south, based on height differences from surrounding paddy fields. This enclosed area is divided into squares measuring 40 meters on each side, surrounded by a narrow ditch. Numerous Sue ware pottery shards with ink inscriptions confirmed that this was the site of the kokufu. These shards also indicate that the complex was in use from the late Asuka period at the end of the 8th century, and was abandoned in the Heian period in the middle of the 11th century.

The archaeology of the site is complex, as the buildings on this site have been rebuilt on four separate occasions. Phase 1 is estimated to be from the end of the 8th century to the first half of the 9th century. During this time, he complex consisted of wooden buildings arranged in a "U" configuration, with a main mall and two side buildings to the east and two side buildings to the west, forming a central courtyard. The building pillars were originally set directly into the ground. Phase II is estimated to be from the first half of the 9th century to the first half of the 10th century. The number of side buildings was reduced to one on each side, but a gate was added to the south of the complex. Phase III is estimated to be from the first half of the 10th century to the second half of the 10th century. During this phase, the buildings had transitioned to using foundation stones. Phase IV is from the latter half of the 10th century to the middle of the 11th century. The complex was in decline and consisted only of the main hall and the eastern side building.

The site is now backfilled and has mostly reverted to rice paddy. It is about a five-minute walk from Sanagu Station on the JR West Kansai Main Line.

== See also ==
- List of Historic Sites of Japan (Mie)
