= Akeai Kofun =

Kofun burial mound, Japan

Akeae Kofun
- 明合古墳 (Japanese)
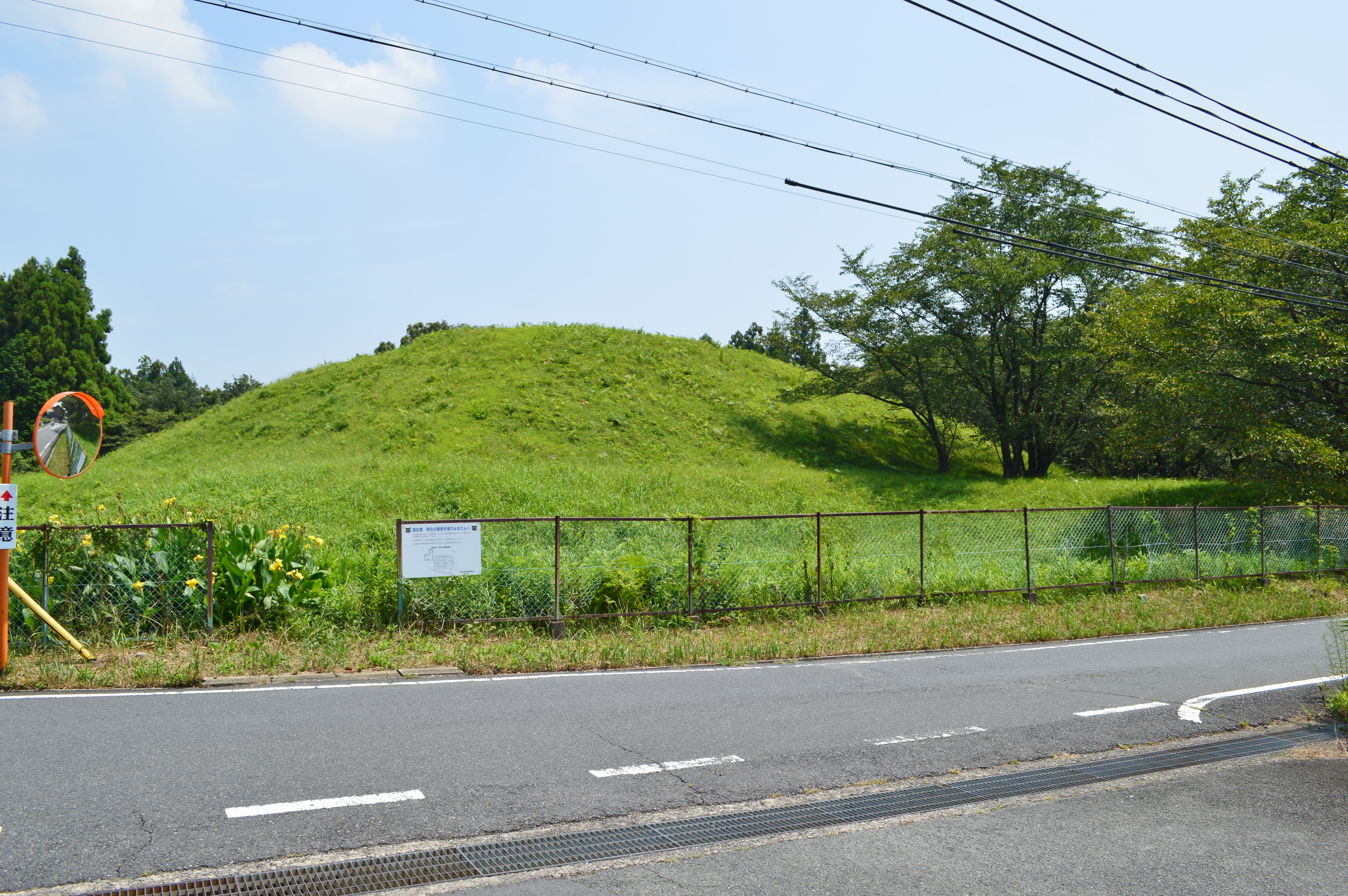
- Akeae Kofun

- Akeae Kofun Akeai Kofun (Japan)
- 34°46′2.65″N 136°26′23.22″E
- Type: Kofun
- Periods: Kofun period
- Location: Tsu, Mie, Japan
- Region: Kansai region

Site notes
- Public access: Yes

The Akeae Kofun (明合古墳) is a kofun burial mound located in the Ano neighborhood of the city of Tsu, Mie Prefecture in the Kansai region of Japan. It was designated a National Historic Site of Japan in 1952.

== Overview ==
The Akeae Kofun is located at the eastern end of a low hill with an elevation of 40 meters extending from the eastern foot of Kyogamine in the middle of the Ano River in central Mie Prefecture. It is an extremely unusual Sōhōchū-hofun (双方中方墳)-type tumulus, which is shaped like an hourglass when viewed from above, consisting of trapezoidal mounds that extend from either side of a large square central mound. Cylindrical haniwa, shield-shaped haniwa, house-shaped haniwa, and other figurative haniwa were excavated from the top and upper tier of the main burial mound, which date its construction to the first half of the middle Kofun period (first half of the 5th century AD).Fukiishi have also been found on the surface of the mound, and fragments of Sue ware pottery have also been discovered. The tumulus was also once surrounded by a moat. However, the burial chamber and grave goods are not known, as the interior of tumulus has never been excavated.

The kofun was discovered in 1945. It is one of a cluster of eight tumuli that were once in this area, of which this tumulus and five smaller ones survive. The area is now open to the public as the Akeae Kofun Historic Park (明合古墳歴史公園, Akeae Kofun Rekishi Kōen)

Total length
81.1 meters:
Central portion
60.0 x 48.3 meters x 1.7 to 2.5 meters (lower tier) / 42 x 15 meters x 6.0 to 7.0 meters (upper tier)
North extension
10.0 meters long x 17.4 meters wide x 1.8 meters high
South extension
13.0 meters ling x 21 meters wide x 1.7 to 20 meters high

== Gallery ==
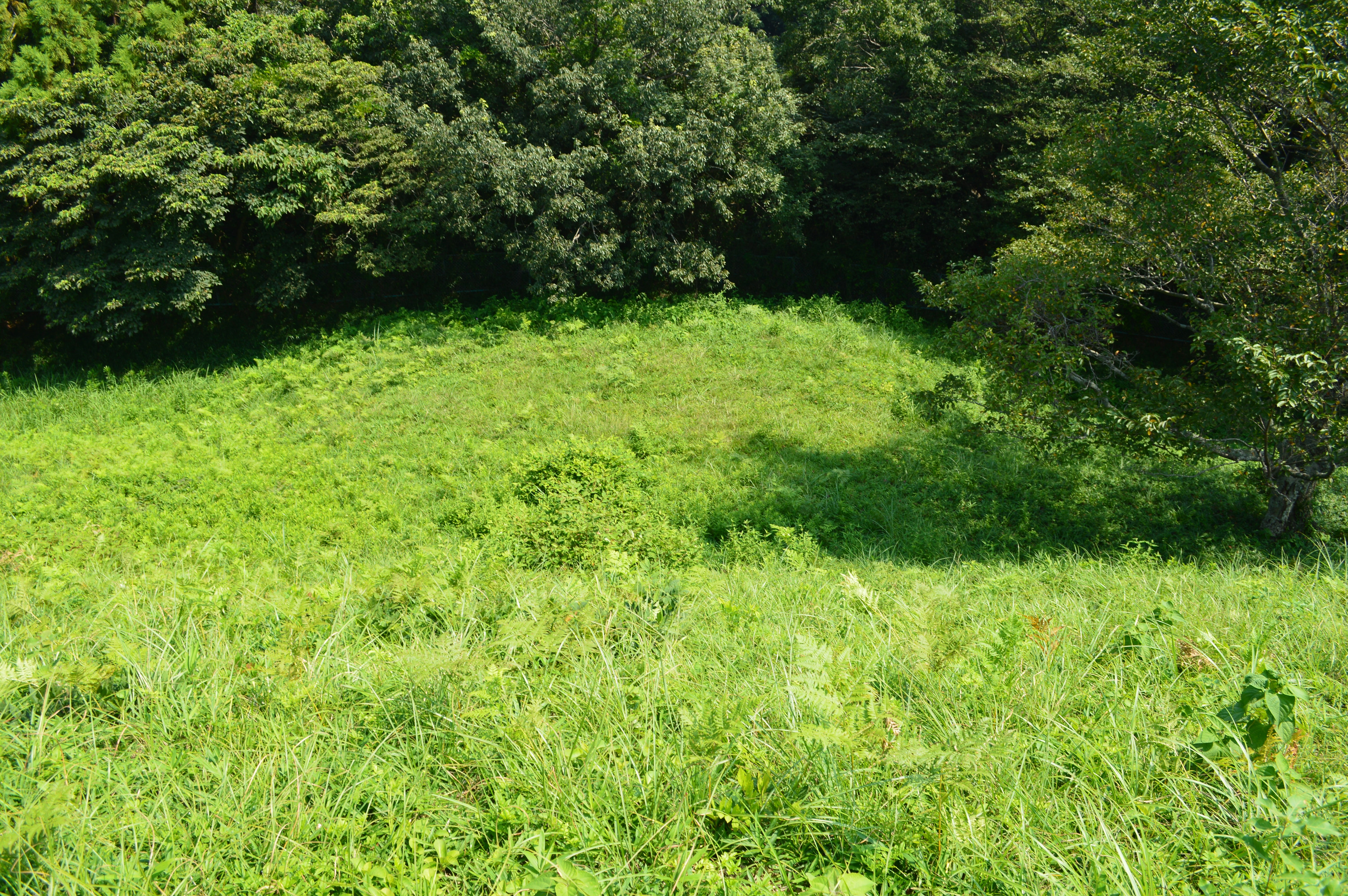
North extension

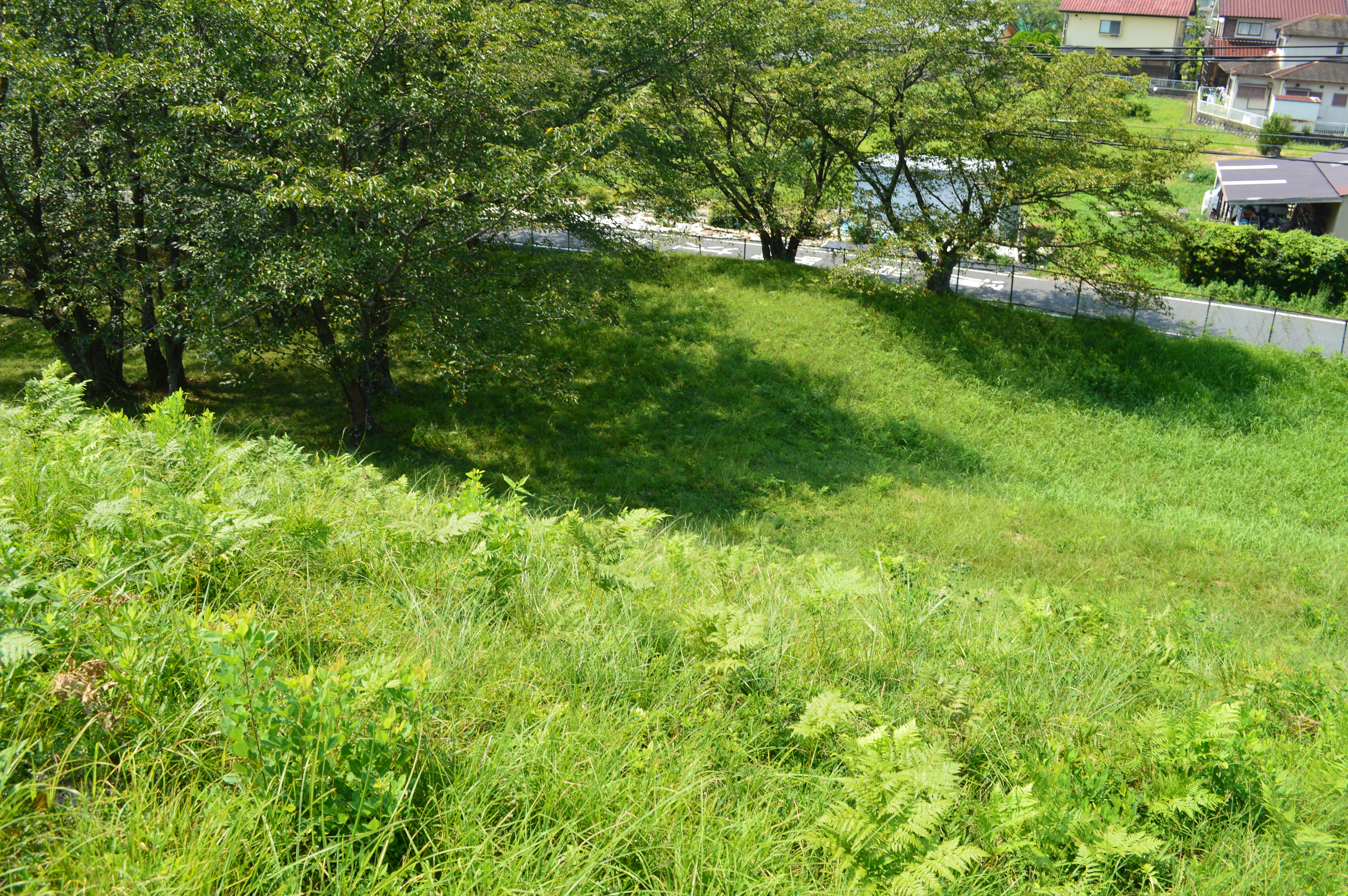
south extension

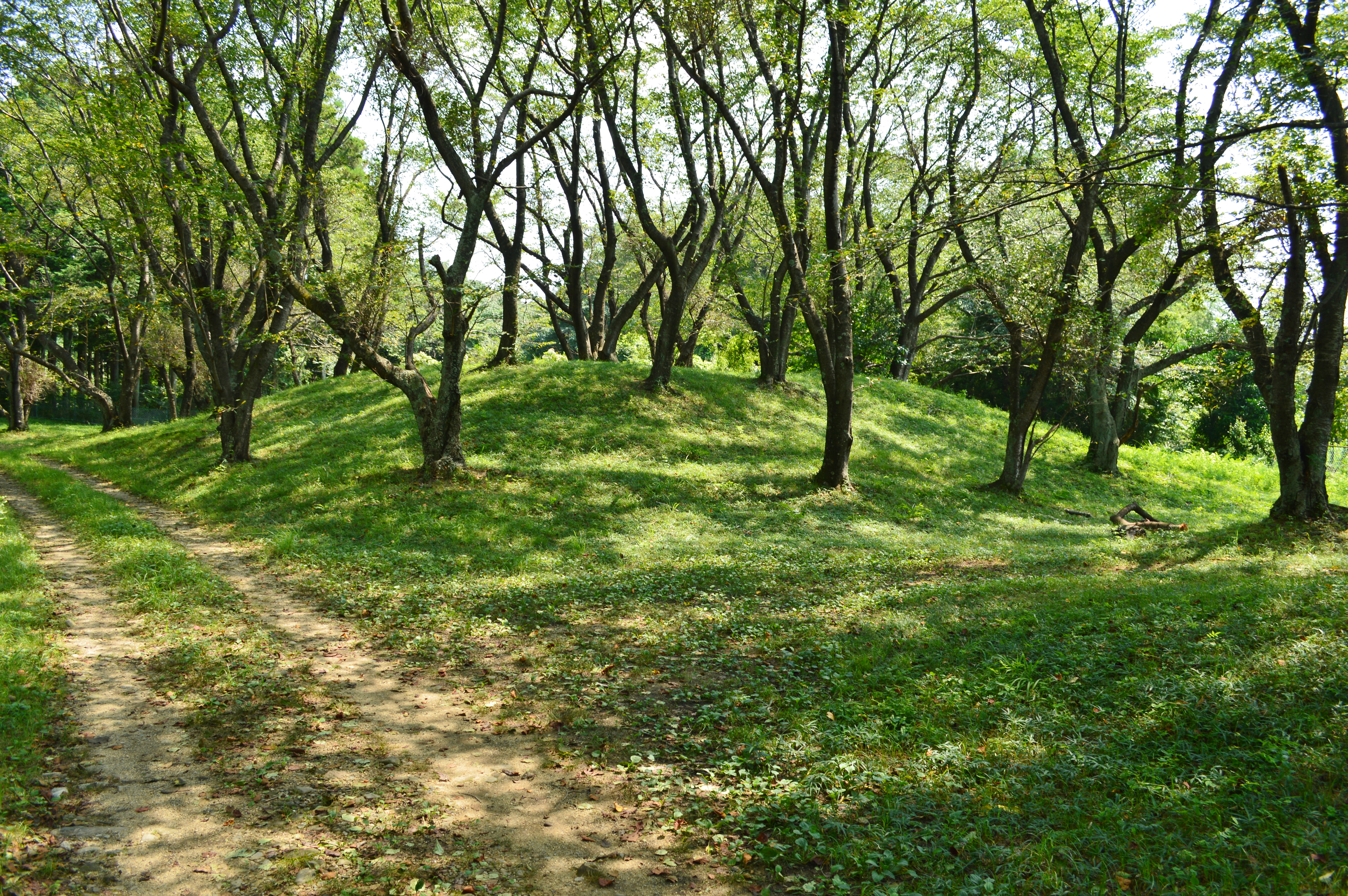
central portion

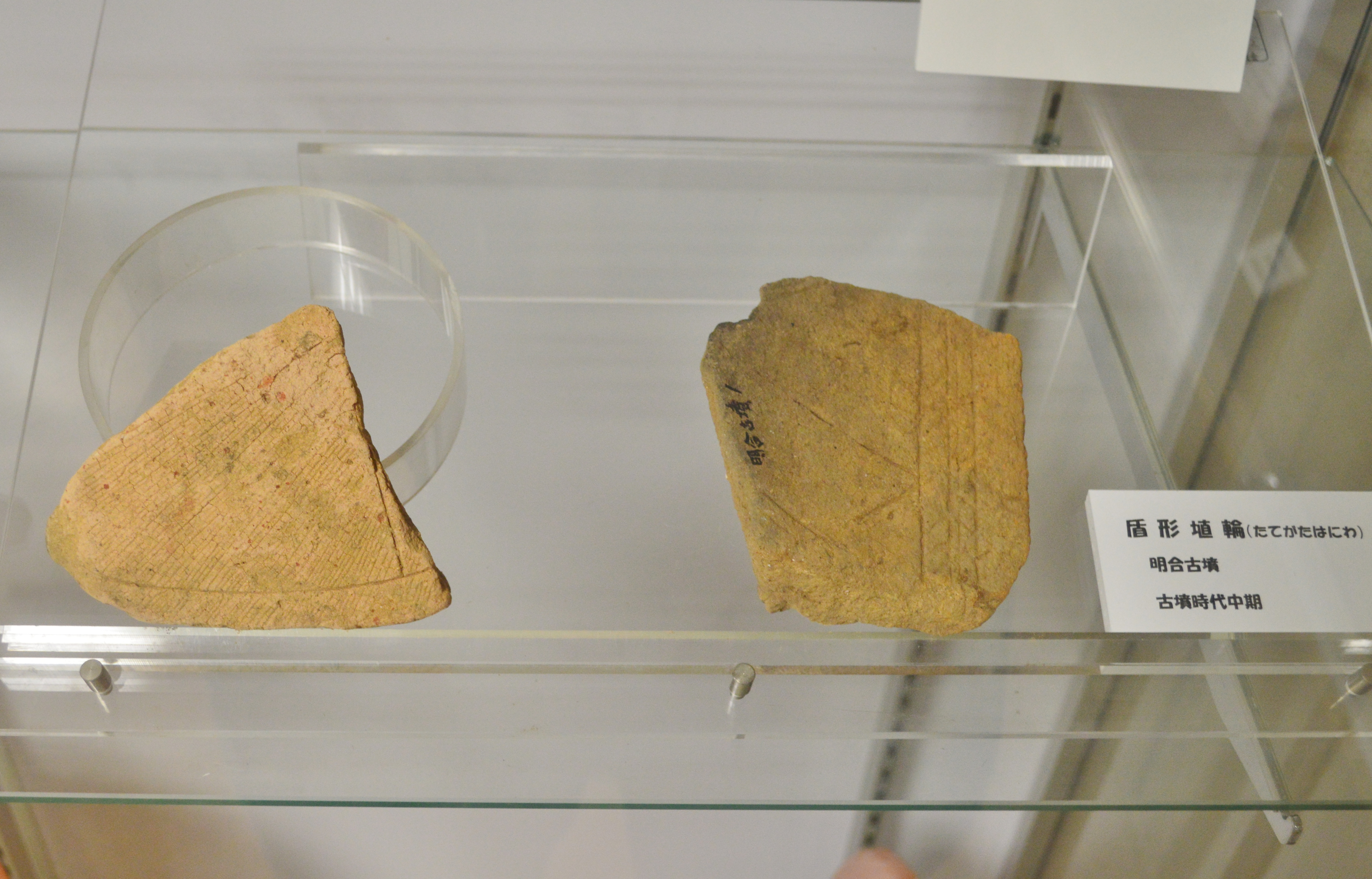
fragments of haniwa

== See also ==
- List of Historic Sites of Japan (Mie)
