= Kurube Kanga ruins =

- 久留倍官衙遺跡 (Japanese)
- Kurube Kanga ruins Kurube Kanga ruins (Japan)
- 35°00′53″N 136°38′00″E
- Periods: Nara - Heian period
- Location: Yokkaichi, Mie, Japan
- Region: Kansai region

History
- Built: 8th-9th century AD

Site notes
- Elevation: 27 m (89 ft)
- Public access: No

The Kurube Kanga ruins (久留倍官衙遺跡, Kurube Kanga iseki) is an archaeological site with the ruins of an Asuka to Heian period government administrative complex located in what is now the Oyachi neighborhood of the city of Yokkaichi in Mie prefecture in the northern Kansai region of Japan. The site has been protected as a National Historic Site from 2006.

== Overview ==
In the late Nara period, after the establishment of a centralized government under the Ritsuryō system, local rule over the provinces was standardized under a kokufu (provincial capital), and each province was divided into smaller administrative districts, known as (郡, gun, kōri), composed of 2–20 townships in 715 AD. Each of the units had an administrative complex, or kanga (官衙遺跡) built on a semi-standardized layout based on contemporary Chinese design.

The Kurube Kanga ruins are located on a hill with an elevation of approximately 30 meters overlooking Ise Bay. The site is complex, having been inhabited since the Yayoi period. A cluster of a large number of excavated pillar buildings were found in 1999 during construction of a highway bypass for Japan National Route 1 and were excavated in 2001. The group of buildings occupied a walled compound measuring 42 meters east-to-west by 51 meters north-to-south, at the top of the hill. On the eastern slope of the hill was a separate moated enclosure, 66 meters east-to-west by 90 meters north-to-south which contained the foundations of a granary complex for storing tax rice. Based on the location, it is highly likely that this was the location of the local administration complex for Asake County in Ise Province, which in described in the Nihon Shoki and various other ancient texts. This is also a location where Prince Ōama (later known as Emperor Tenmu) stayed during the Asuka period Jinshin War.

The foundations of more than 80 structures have been found. The buildings were constructed in three separate phases:

Phase I - The initial phase dates from the end of the 7th century to the first half of the 8th century and consists of a main hall with side halls to the north and south in a "U" configuration, open to the east, facing a large gate. Additional excavated pillar builds have also been found at the base of the hill, along with earlier pit dwellings. The orientation of the complex facing east is unique among government complexes thus far excavated.

Phase II - From the first half to the second half of the 8th century, the earlier complex was replaced by a two long buildings facing south. The main building was a 14 by 3 bay hall, 29.4 x 6.9 meters and the northern building was 14 x 3 bays, 30.0 x 6.75 meters,

Phase III - The granary complex dates from the latter half of the 8th century to the end of the 9th century, and is thus slightly later than the main buildings.

The site was backfilled after excavation, and is now an empty field. There are plans to open the site as the Kurube Kanga Archaeological Park (久留倍官衙遺跡公園) with a museum and reconstructions of buildings. It is located about five minutes by car from Yokkaichi Station on the Kintetsu Nagoya Line.

== See also ==
- List of Historic Sites of Japan (Mie)
