= Tenpaku Site =

Archaeological site in Matsusaka, Mie, Japan

Tenpaku site
- 天白遺跡 (Japanese)
- Tenpaku site Tenpaku Site (Japan)
- 34°36′39″N 136°26′20″E
- Type: necropolis
- Periods: Jōmon period
- Location: Matsusaka, Mie, Japan
- Region: Kinki region

Site notes
- Public access: None

The Tenpaku site (天白遺跡, Tenpaku iseki) is an archaeological site containing the ruins of a Jōmon period necropolis and ritual site located in the Ureshino Kamoda neighborhood of the city of Matsusaka in the Kansai region of Japan. It was designated a National Historic Site of Japan in 2000.

== Overview ==
The Tenpaku site is located at an elevation of 28 meters on a fluvial terrace where the Nakamura River, a tributary of the Kumozu River, meanders greatly near Kamakuta village. It consists of a group of graves or ritual sites concentrated in an area of 40 meters east-to-west by 50 meters north-to-south. As a result of an archaeological excavation in 1992 by the Mie Prefectural Buried Cultural Property Center, 37 stone-lined graves and 24 earthenware burials were discovered, and, although located only one meter below the surface, the state of preservation was good. These burials are estimated to date from the latter half of the late Jōmon period (4500 to 3300 years ago).

Many stone-lined graves are found from the central mountainous area to eastern Japan, but it is extremely rare to find so many in a single concentration in western Japan. Many grave goods, including magatama, more than 60 clay figurines, 1686 items of earthenware with vermillion pigment, and 376 stone tools and 61 other stone products were discovered. A total of 2213 of these artifacts were collectively designated a Registered Tangible Cultural Property of Japan in 2018.

Although the site contained many circular and ring-shaped stone arrangements, and 30 areas with burnt soil, no dwelling sites have been positively identified. It is presumed that this was a site for funerary rituals, with the Shimooki site located two kilometers upstream of the Nakamura River as the leading candidate for the residence site.

The site was backfilled after excavation and is about 15 minutes by car from Ise-Nakagawa Station on the Kintetsu Osaka Line.

== See also ==
- List of Historic Sites of Japan (Mie)
