= Sūkōdō =

- 崇広堂
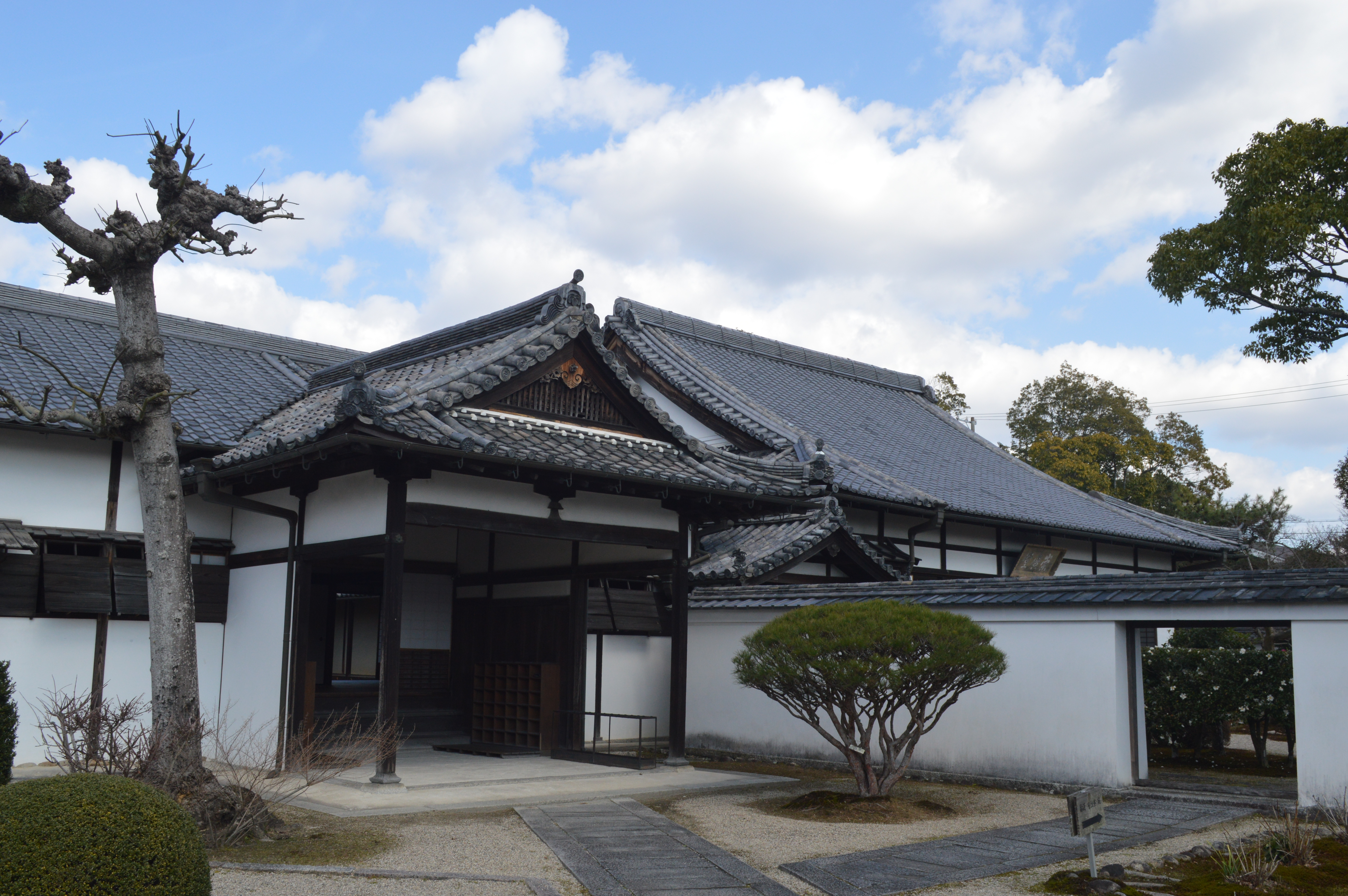
- Entrance and main hall

- Location within Mie Prefecture Location within Japan

General information
- Type: Han School
- Location: Iga, Mie, Japan, Japan
- Coordinates: 34°46′04″N 136°07′32″E
- Opened: 1821
- National Historic Site of Japan

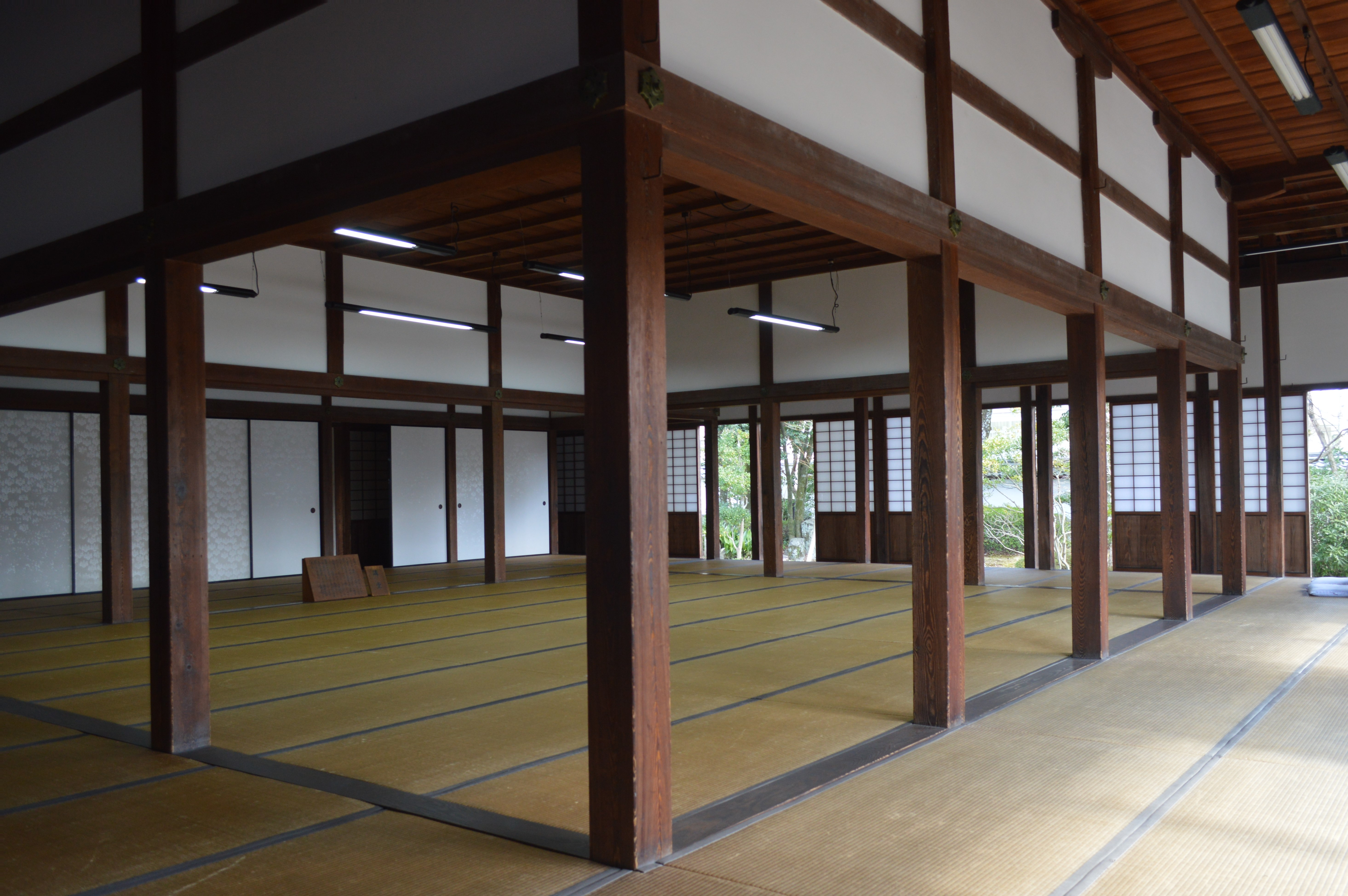
Sūkōdō inside

The Sūkōdō (崇広堂) was a Han school of Tsu Domain under the Edo period Tokugawa shogunate. It was located in the Marunouchi neighborhood of the city of Iga in the Kansai region of Japan. The school was designated a National Historic Site of Japan in 1930, with the area under protection expanded in 1994.

== Overview ==
The Sūkōdō was constructed in 1821 just to the south of Iga Ueno Castle by Todo Takasato, the 10th daimyō of Tsu Domain, as a branch school of the main domain academy, the Yuzokan. It was named after a phrase in the Book of Documents, one of the works of classical Chinese literature attributed to Confucius. The school also included a dojo which taught the Shinkage-ryū and Wakayama-ryū schools of Japanese swordsmanship, headed by a branch of the Tsuda family, who were the hereditary swordmasters for the Toda clan. According to the existing drawings, there was a school hall in the east and a martial arts hall in the west, separated by a ditch. Most of the buildings collapsed during the 1854 Tōkai earthquake, but were reconstructed, At present, the large tile-roofed red front gate, auditorium, dormitory, kitchen and library survive.

After the Meiji restoration, the building was used as a municipal library until the construction of the Ueno City Library in 1984. The site is a short walk from Nishi-Ote Station on the Kintetsu Iga Line.

== See also ==
- List of Historic Sites of Japan (Mie)
