= Tanikawa Kotosuga =

Japanese kokugaku scholar

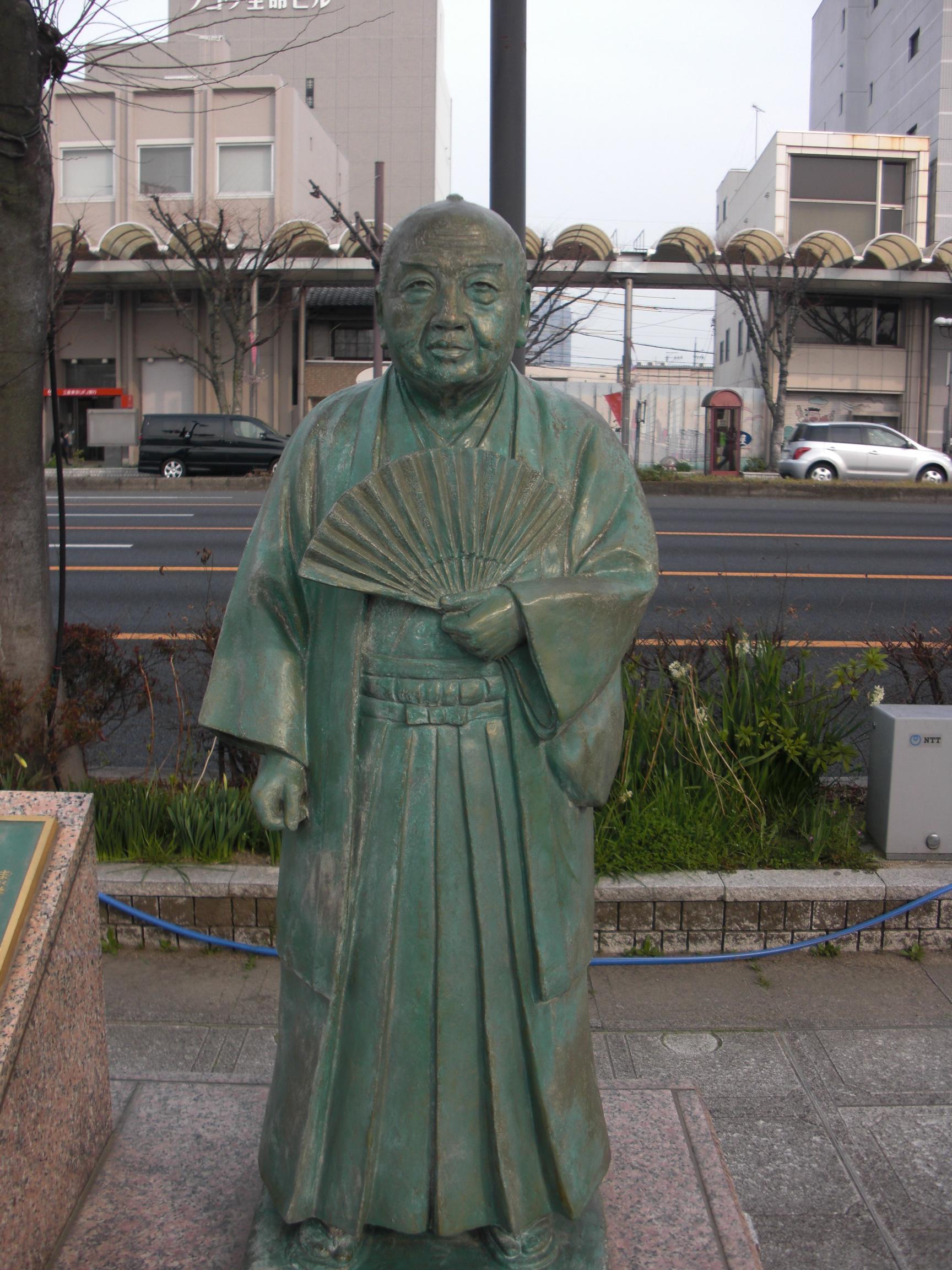
- Statue of Tanikawa Kotosuga
- Born: April 5, 1709; Tsu, Mie Japan
- Died: November 20, 1776 (aged 67); Tsu, Mie
- Occupation: kokugaku scholar

Tanikawa Kotosuga (谷川 士清; April 5, 1709 – November 20, 1776) was a Japanese kokugaku scholar and author in mid-Edo period Japan. He also used the epistolary name of “Tansai”.

== Biography ==
Tanikawa was the eldest son of a physician in Ano District, Ise Province (now part of the city of Tsu, Mie). He went to Kyoto to study medicine, and became a disciple of Matsuoka Gentatsu (1668-1746), Matsuoka Yūen (1701-83), and Tamaki Masahide (1670-1736), but during his stay in Kyoto became a follower of Suika Shintoism. He also studied the Man'yōshū under Higuchi Munetake, a disciple of kokugaku scholar Imai Jikan (1657-1723) and waka poetry under Prince Arisugawa Yorihito.

After returning to Mie, Tanigawa opened the Tanigawajuku academy to spread his kokugaku and Shintoist philosophies while practicing medicine. He collated the texts of the ancient chronicle Nihon Shoki and published an annotated 35-volume version called the “Nihon shoki tsūshō” in 1751. Motoori Norinaga (1730-1801) was much impressed by this work, and hereafter the two scholars corresponded regularly. Tanigawa is also known for his “Wakun no shiori” the first Japanese dictionary arranged in order of the Japanese syllabary. It was completed in 1775, shortly before his death. It consists of ninety-three volumes and the entire work was not published until 1887.

== Residence ==
The Tanikawa Kotosuga Former Residence (谷川士清旧宅, Tanikawa Kotosuga kyū-taku) in the Hatchō neighborhood of Tsu survives. It is a simple two-story townhouse with a north-facing style roof, which was built or renovated in 1775, and dismantled and repaired in 1979. The house is located on the west side of the city of Tsu, along the Iga Kaidō ancient highway that connects Tsu with Iga Ueno. It was designated a National Historic Site in 1967. The building now serves as a museum, with biographical displays and copies of his works. It is located a three-minute walk from the "Tsu Kōkōmae" bus stop on the Mie Kotsu Bus from the Kintetsu Nagoya Line Tsu-shimmachi Station.

== Grave ==
The Tanikawa Kotosuga grave (谷川士清墓, Tanikawa Kotosuga no haka) was designated a National Historic Site in 1944. It is located at the temple of Fukuzo-ji in the Oshikabe-cho neighborhood of the city of Mie, which was the bodaiji for the Tanikawa family. The tomb is to the left of the Hondō of the temple a is protected by a stone fence with an iron gate. The tombstone consists of two layers of base stones forming a low platform, with a monument measuring 24 x 18 cm with a height of 54 centimeters. The tomb is next to the graves of Tanikawa's father and grandson. The temple is a five-minute walk from the "Tsu Kōkōmae" bus stop on the Mie Kotsu Bus from Tsu-shimmachi Station.

== See also ==
- List of Historic Sites of Japan (Mie)
