= Haifudaraku-ji Chōseki =

Distance marker akin to a milestone

- 廃補陀落寺町石 (Japanese)
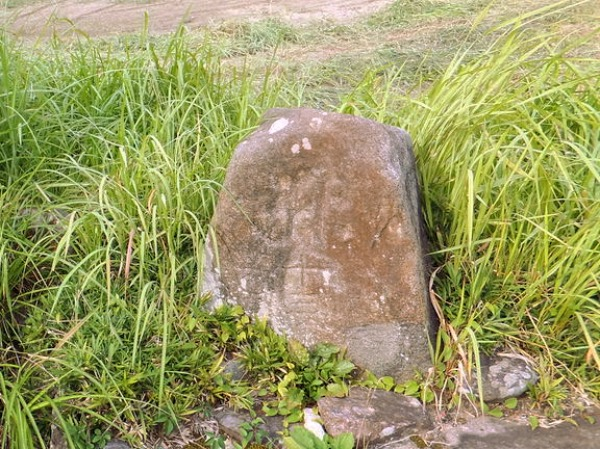
- Haifudaraku-ji Chōseki

- Haifudaraku-ji Chōseki Haifudaraku-ji Chōseki (Japan)
- 34°47′31″N 136°05′38″E
- Periods: Kamakura period
- Location: Iga, Mie, Japan
- Region: Kansai region

History
- Built: 1253

Site notes
- Public access: Yes

The Haifudaraku-ji Chōseki (廃補陀落寺町石, Haifudarakuji chōseki) is a distance marker akin to a milestone, located in what is now part of the city of Iga, Mie Prefecture in the Kansai region of Japan. It was designated a National Historic Site of Japan in 1933.

== Overview ==
During the mid-Kamakura period, a series of distance markers were erected on the ancient Nara kaidō connecting the ancient capital with the Ise Grand Shrine. These stone monuments were located between the Nishitakakura neighborhood of the city of Iga, and the Buddhist temple of Fudaraku-ji at the summit of Mount Mizukami. These markers served to guide pilgrims to the temple, and were also votive offerings by the people who donated to their construction. Each is made from a solid slab of granite 110-cm in height and are engraved with a Siddhaṃ script character and the names of the donors. The stones are spaced one chō apart (approximately every 109 meters), and 15 are known to have once existed. Ten have survived, of which eight are covered under the National Historic Site designation, and two are protected as Iga City Historic Monuments. Four of these monuments dated 1253 and are the oldest of their type in Japan. The site is located about 15-minutes from the Toriide bus stop on the Mie Kotsu Bus from Noichi Station on the Iga Railway Iga Line. The temple of Fudaraku-ji itself no longest exists.

== See also ==
- List of Historic Sites of Japan (Mie)
