= Jukyō-ji =

Jōdo-shū Buddhist temple, Japan

- 樹敬寺
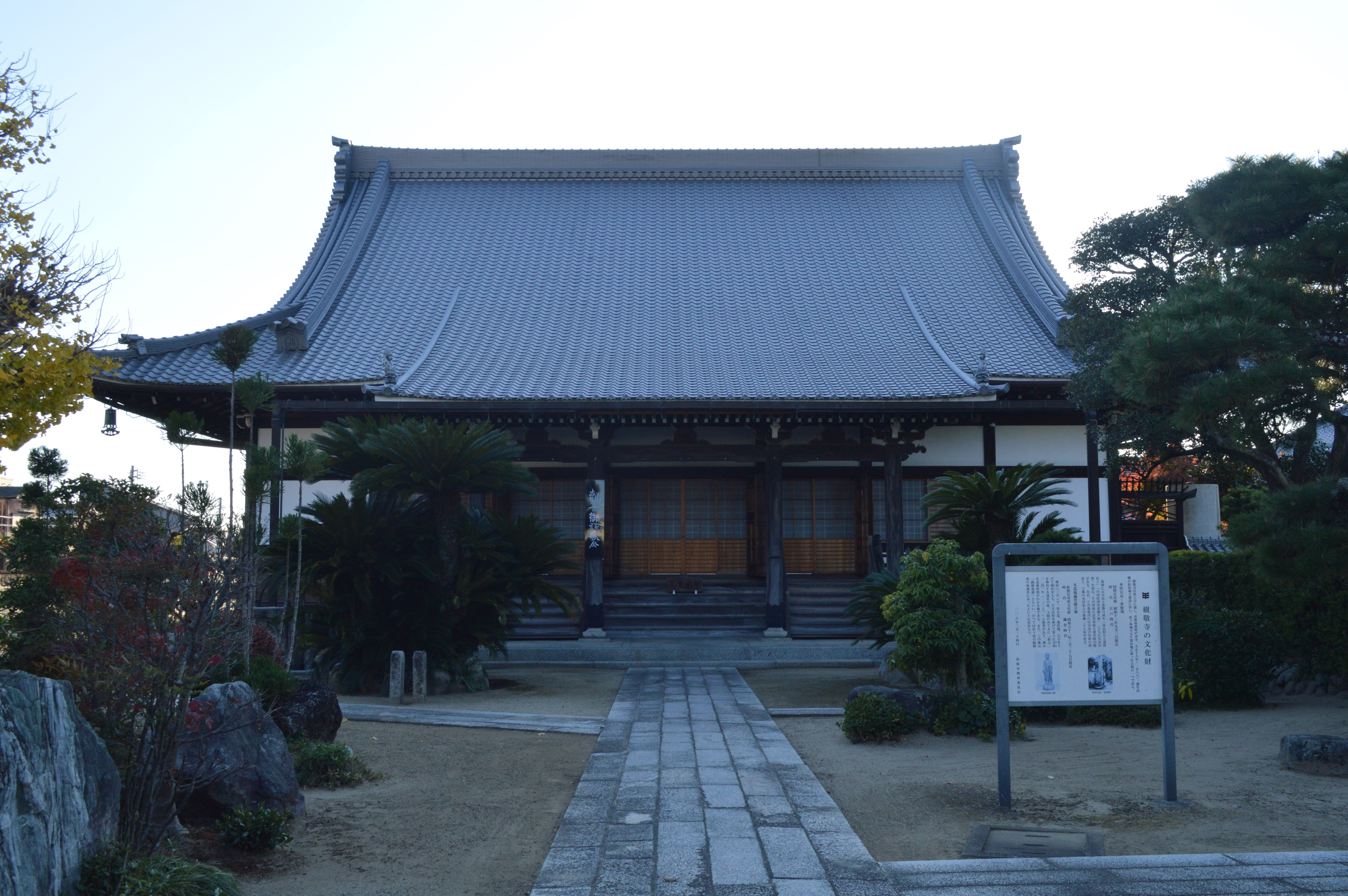
- Jukyō-ji Main Hall

- Jukyō-ji Jukyō-ji (Japan)

Religion
- Affiliation: Buddhist
- Rite: Jōdo-shū

Location
- Location: 874 Shinmachi, Matsusaka, Mie 515-0075
- Country: Japan
- Interactive map of Jukyō-ji
- Coordinates: 34°34′20″N 136°32′53″E

Architecture
- Founder: Shunjōbō Chōgen
- Completed: 1195

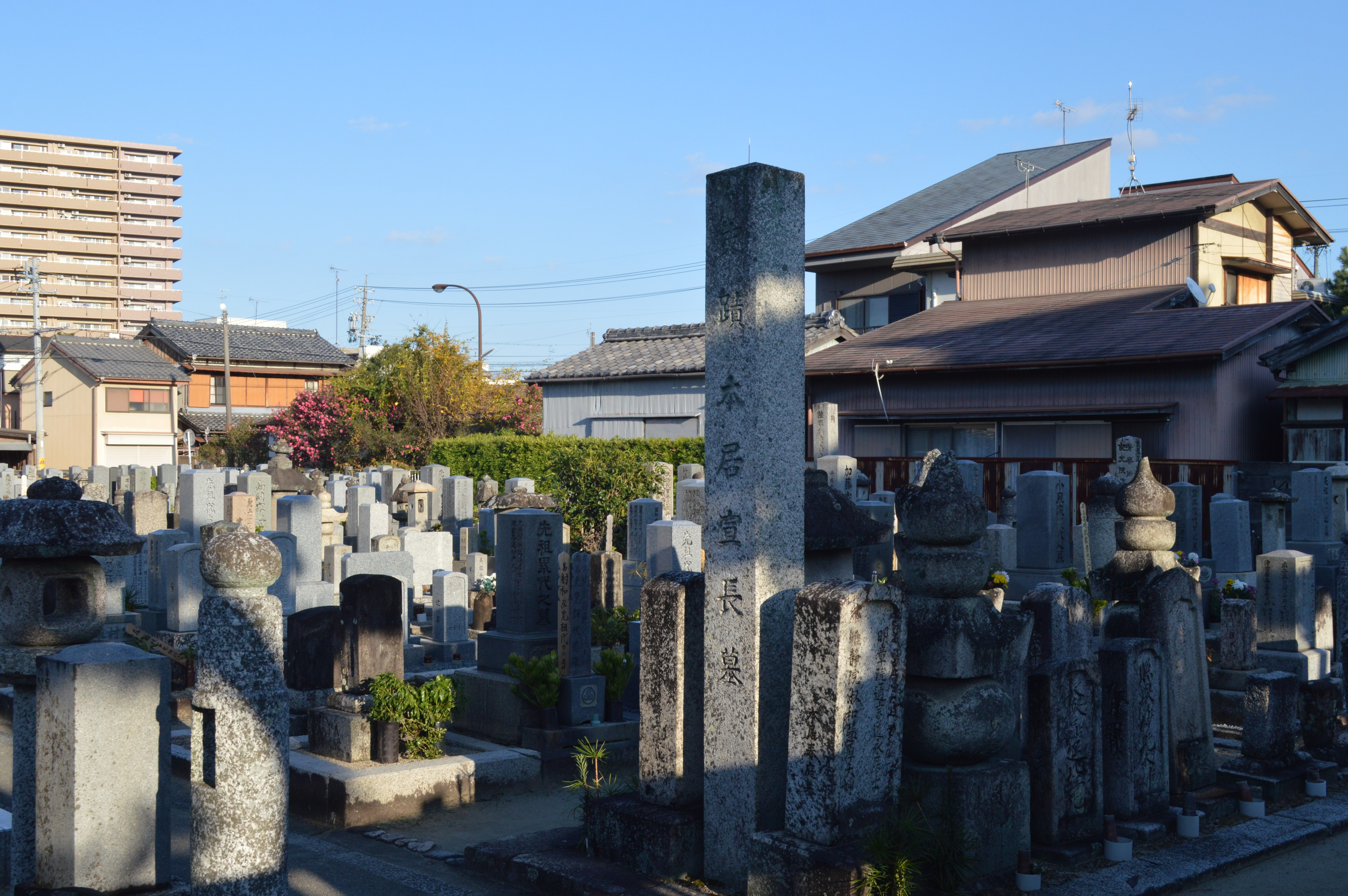
Motoori Norinaga grave

Jukyō-ji (樹敬寺) is a Jōdo-shū Buddhist temple in the Shinmachi neighborhood of the city of Matsusaka, Japan. It is a subsidiary of Chion-in in Kyoto. It contains the grave of the Edo period kokugaku scholar Motoori Norinaga and his son Motoori Harunaga, which was collectively designated a National Historic Site in 1936.

== History ==
Jukyō-ji traces it history to a hermitage built in 1195 by a priest named Shunjōbō Chōgen in order to promote the reconstruction of Tōdai-ji's Daibutsuden in Nara. The hermitage burned down in 1428 but was restored by another Jōdō prelate named Kyōyo to promote Pure Land Buddhism at Ise Grand Shrine. The temple's name comes from Kyōyo's rank within the Jōdō hierarchy.

During the Sengoku period, when Gamō Ujisato relocated his seat to Matsusaka Castle, the temple was rebuilt. During the Edo period, it became the bodaiji of the Motoori clan. Located about twelve minutes from his residence, Motoori Norinaga often came to this temple to hear sermons by its priest and to participate in poetry readings.

The cemetery of Jukyō-ji houses 26 tombs of the Motoori clan, including that of Motoori Norinaga and his son Motoori Haruniwa. The National Historic Site designation is for 9.42 square meters surrounding Motoori Norinaga's tombstone. However, this tomb contains only a lock of his hair; he has another tomb (under a separate National Historic Sit designation) on Mount Yamamuro, in which his body was buried.

The temple is a ten-minute walk from Matsusaka Station on the Kisei Main Line.

== See also ==
- List of Historic Sites of Japan (Mie)
