= Nomura Ichirizuka =

- 野村一里塚 (Japanese)
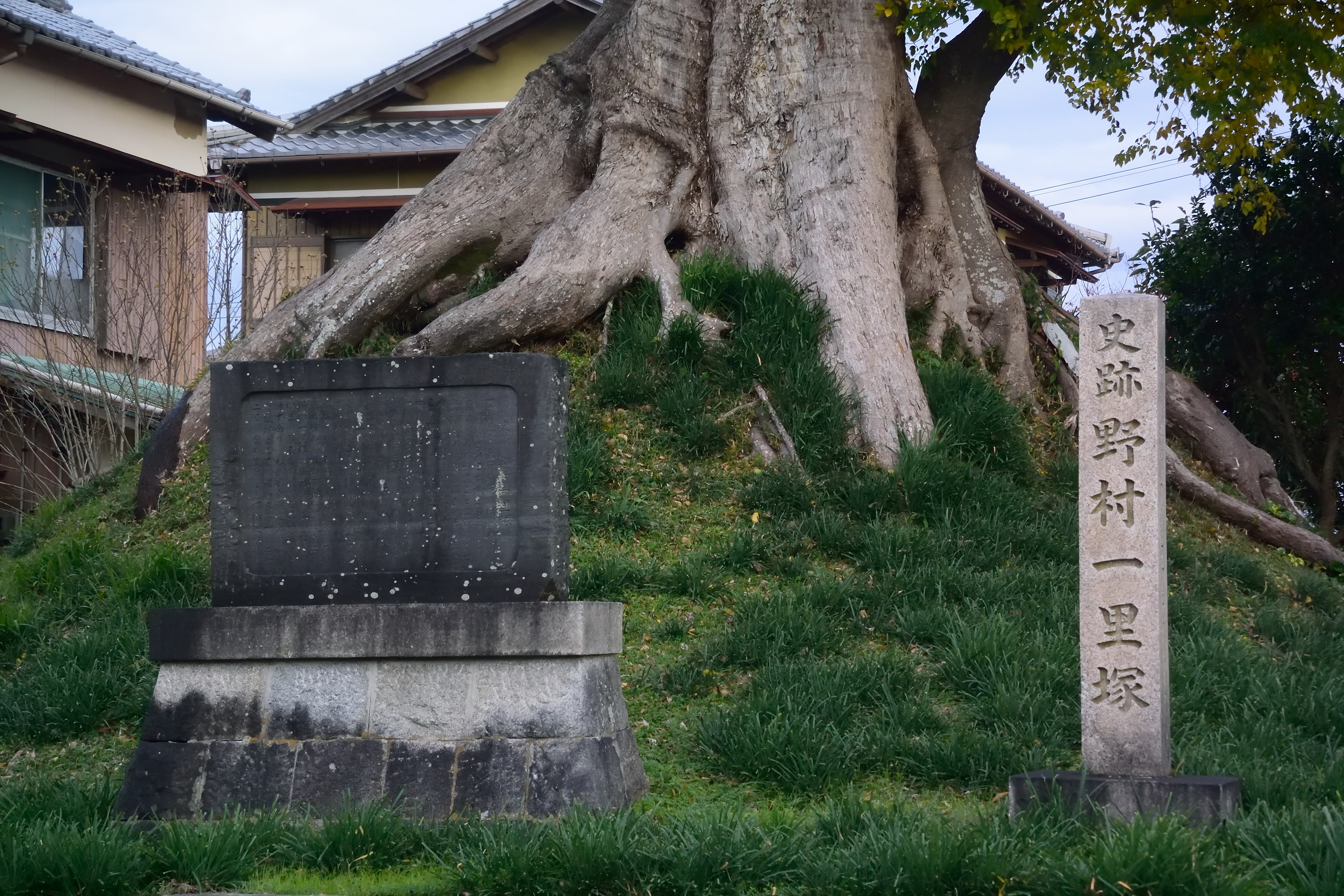
- Nomura Ichirizuka

- Nomura Ichirizuka Nomura Ichirizuka (Japan)
- 34°51′26″N 136°26′14″E
- Periods: Edo period
- Location: Kameyama, Mie, Japan
- Region: Kansai region

Site notes
- Public access: Yes

Nomura Ichirizuka (野村一里塚) is an ichirizuka, an earthen mound used historically as a distance marker in the same way as a milestone in Japan, in the Nomura neighborhood of the city of Kameyama, Mie Prefecture in the Kansai region. It was designated a National Historic Site of Japan in 1934.

== Overview ==
During the Edo period Tokugawa shogunate established ichirizuka on major roads, enabling calculation of distance travelled and of the charge for transportation by kago or palanquin. These markers were a pair of earthen mounds which stated the distance in ri (3.927 kilometres (2.440 mi)) to Nihonbashi, the "Bridge of Japan", erected in Edo in 1603. They were typically planted with an enoki or Japanese red pine to provide shelter for travelers. Since the Meiji period most of the ichirizuka have disappeared, having been destroyed by the elements, modern highway construction and urban encroachment. In 1876, the "Ichirizuka Abolition decree" was issued by the Meiji government, and many were demolished at that time. Seventeen surviving ichirizuka are designated as national historic sites.

The Nomura ichirizuka, completed in 1604, is on the Tōkaidō highway connecting Kyoto with Edo. It is located to the west of Kameyama Castle, 106 ri 12 chō from Edo, and 17 ri, 32 cho from Kyoto, and is the only survivor of twelve ichirizuka originally in the prefecture. The mound on the southern side of the road was destroyed in 1918; only the northern mound survives. It is planted with a Muku tree estimated to be 400 years old. A 1711 illustrated guide to the Tōkaidō describes the southern mound as having three enoki trees. The site is about a 15-minute walk from Kameyama railway station on the JR West Kansai Main Line.

== See also ==
- List of Historic Sites of Japan (Mie)
