= Ōzuka Kofun (Suzuka) =

Archaeological site in Japan

- 王塚古墳 (Japanese)
- Ōzuka Kofun Ōzuka Kofun (Suzuka) (Japan)
- 34°51′06″N 136°29′27″E
- Type: Kofun
- Periods: Kofun period
- Location: Suzuka, Mie, Japan
- Region: Kansai region

History
- Built: 6th century AD

Site notes
- Public access: Yes (no public facilities)

The Ōzuka Kofun (王塚古墳) is a Kofun period burial mound located in the Hachino-cho neighborhood of Suzuka, Mie Prefecture in the Kansai region of Japan. The tumulus was designated a National Historic Site of Japan in 1970. It is also known as the Nishi-no-no No.1 Kofun (西の野1号墳)

== Overview ==
The Ōzuka Kofun is located on the east bank of the Suzuka River and is then largest tumulus in the Nō Kofun Cluster. It is a zenpō-kōen-fun (前方後円墳), which is shaped like a keyhole, having one square end and one circular end, when viewed from above. The tumulus has a total length of 62 meters. From its shape, it is believed to have been built in the late Kofun period (early 6th century AD). The shield-shaped double moat surrounding the tumulus is almost completely preserved. The outer bank is about three meters wide and about one meter high. The tomb was opened in 1899 by local amateur explorers, and the grave goods, which included a number of iron swords, have been lost. An anthropomorphic haniwa has been recovered from moat.

Despite the protected status of the site, in March 1991, a construction company announced plans to develop the site for materials storage. This was blocked by Suzuka City as the area was a well-known archaeological site, in which Jōmon pottery, Sue ware, Haji ware and Kofun period tumuli were known to exist, in addition to which portions of the area covered by the National Historic Site designation. However, in March 1992, the city discovered that much of the area had been excavated by heavy machinery and that several tumuli had already been destroyed. A cease and desist order was issued, but the construction company responded that the land had already been resold to individuals through a real estate developer for a housing estate. On further investigation, Suzuka City found that the southern half of the site could be backfilled and restored to near its original state, but that the northern half of the site was too damaged. A rescue archaeology project was undertaken in 1992. The Ōzuka Kofun itself was not damaged during these events; however, many of the 91 tumuli which appeared in Meiji period maps and the sites of over 100 pit dwellings dating from the Jōmon period through Kofun period have been lost.

The site is a 10-minute walk from the "Suzukotsu Bridge" bus stop on the Mie Kotsu Bus from Hiratachō Station on the Kintetsu Railway Suzuka Line.

Total length
62 meters:
Anterior rectangular portion
47 meters wide
Posterior circular portion
37 meter diameter x 6 meters high

== See also ==
- List of Historic Sites of Japan (Mie)
