= Shōbō-ji Sansō =

Castle that is located in the Kansai region of Japan, built in the Sengoku period

Shōbōji Sansō
- 正法寺山荘
- Kameyama, Mie, Japan

Site information
- Type: Japanese castle
- Open to the public: yes
- Condition: ruins

Location
- Shōbōji Sansō Shōbōji Sansō (Japan)
- Coordinates: 34°51′57″N 136°23′26″E

Site history
- Built: 1504
- Built by: Seki Morisada
- In use: Sengoku period

The Shōbōji Sansō (正法寺山荘) was a Sengoku period Japanese castle located in what is now part of the city of Kameyama, Mie Prefecture, in the Kansai region of Japan. Its ruins have been protected as a National Historic Site since 1981.

== Overview ==
The Shōbōji Villa was a fortified mountain villa constructed around 1504 by Seki Morisada on a hillside on the west bank of the Ono River, a tributary of the Suzuka River. The site is at an elevation of 105 meters and is surrounded by rivers on three sides and cliffs to the north and south, forming a natural fortress. The Seki clan, a cadet branch of the Heike clan, dominated the Suzuka region of northern Ise Province from the Kamakura period from their main seat at Kameyama Castle. The location was originally a Rinzai Zen temple called Shōbō-ji which is mentioned in historical documents as a place visited by the renga poetry master Sōchō, who held a poetry contest there. Seki Morisada modified the temple buildings to create a mountain retreat, which was later fortified with stone walls in response to the threat of invasion of Ise Province by Oda Nobunaga. The Seki continued to use this location until they were transferred to Shirakawa in Mutsu Province by Toyotomi Hideyoshi in 1590.

Archaeological excavations from 1977 have detected the remains of four buildings, well-ordered masonry drainage ditches, wells, as well as coins from the Northern Song dynasty and Ming dynasty, nails, roof tiles, Tenmoku tea bowls, celadon, white porcelain, and dyed plates.

The castle site is about a 35-minute walk from Seki Station on the JR West Kansai Main Line.

== See also ==
- List of Historic Sites of Japan (Mie)
