= Nagano Castle (Tsu) =

- 長野城
- Tsu, Mie Prefecture, Japan
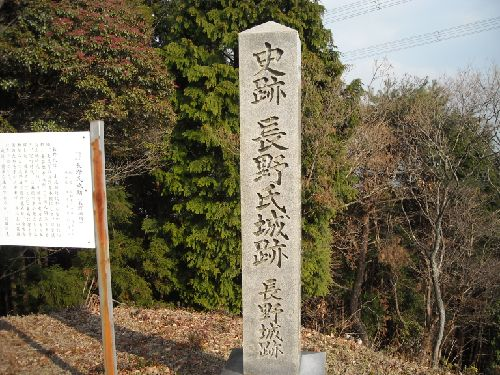
- Site of Nagano Castle

Site information
- Type: Yamashiro- style Japanese
- Condition: ruins

Location
- Nagano Castle Nagano Castle (Japan)
- Coordinates: 34°44′31″N 136°21′57″E

Site history
- Built: 1274
- Demolished: 1560

Nagano Castle (長野城, Nagano-jō) was a Muromachi period "yamashiro"-style (castle located in the Misato neighborhood of the city of Tsu, Mie Prefecture, Japan. The ruins have been protected as a National Historic Site since 1982.

== Overview ==
The ruins of Nagano Castle are located on a steep mountain with an elevation of 520 meters, overlooking the main road to Iga Province, on the north side of what is now the Nagano Elementary School. The castle consists of the main castle with three separate outlying fortifications. The Naka-no-jō (中の城) in the center by the castle proper, with the Higashi-no-jō (東の城) protecting its east flank, and the Nishi-no-jō (西の城) on a nearby ridge at a lower elevation of 230 meters. Each enclsoure is surrounded by a dry moat and by overlapping series of semi-circular earthworks.

The castle was built around in 1274 (in the Kamakura period) by the Kudō clan, who were originally from Izu Province and who had invaded Ise at the order of Minamoto no Yoritomo to seize the province from pro-Taira partisans. The castle was used as the base for a cadet branch of the clan, the Nagano clan. The Nagano clan ruled most of Anno and Anki Districts of Ise Province (modern day cities of Tsu and Suzuka) during the early Muromachi period and were supporters of the Northern Court and Ashikaga shogunate. Nagano Castle was attacked and captured by the Kitabatake clan in 1346 during the wars of the Nanboku-chō period, but was retaken by the Kudō in 1352. From 1360 to 1362, the castle withstood a two-year siege by Niki Yoshinaga, who had rebelled against the authority of the Muromachi shogunate.

In 1569, Oda Nobunaga invaded Ise Province. The Nagano clan allied with the Oda, and Nobunaga's younger brother, Oda Nobukane was adopted into the Nagano clan through a marriage alliance. In 1570, he shifted his seat from Nagano Castle to Iga Ueno Castle and Nagano Castle was allowed to fall into ruin. Currently only some overgrown remnants of the moats and earthworks remain, and a monument to the castle at the top of the mountain.

The ruins are approximately 45 minutes by car from Tsu Station on the Kintetsu Nagoya Line.

== See also ==
- List of Historic Sites of Japan (Mie)
