= Takarazuka Kofun (Mie) =

Group of Kofun period burial mounds in Japan

- 美旗古墳群 (Japanese)
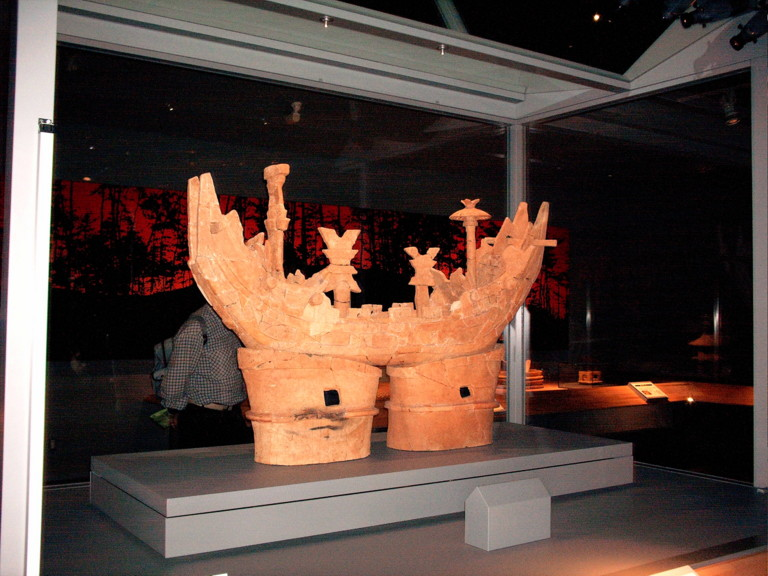
- Boat-shaped haniwa from Takarazuka Kofun

- Takarazuka Kofun Takarazuka Kofun (Mie) (Japan)
- 34°33′00″N 136°30′55″E
- Type: Kofun cluster
- Periods: Kofun period
- Location: Matsusaka, Mie, Japan
- Region: Kansai region

History
- Built: 5th century AD

Site notes
- Public access: Yes (no public facilities)

The Takarazuka Kofun (宝塚古墳) is a group of Kofun period burial mounds located in the Takarazuka neighborhood of the city of Matsusaka, Mie Prefecture in the Kansai region of Japan. It was designated a National Historic Site of Japan in 1932.

== Overview ==
The Takarazuka Kofun are located on low hills on the right bank of the Sakanai River, approximately three kilometers to the south of the center of the city of Matsusaka. The site was first excavated in 1928 by a team from Mie University under the direction of Dr Toshio Sato, and was found to be part of a larger cluster of at least 88 kofun, of which 26 were relatively intact. The site was named the Hanaoka Kofun Group (花岡古墳群) and was proclaimed a National Historic Site in 1932. However, by 1965 encroaching urban development had destroyed 81 of the kofun, and a movement was begun to preserve the remaining seven. However, in the twenty years it took to obtain official injunctions against further destruction and urban development, another three of the remaining kofun were destroyed. Despite the area official protection being extended in 1978, a road was built directly through the site in the 1980s, destroying another two of the remaining four kofun, and physically separating the remaining pair. The two surviving tumuli were excavated from 1998 to 2003 by the Matsusaka City Board of Education. Since 2005, the tumuli have been part of the Takarazuka Kofun Park (宝塚古墳公園)

== Takarazuka Kofun No.1 ==
The Takarazuka Kofun No.1 is a zenpō-kōen-fun (前方後円墳), which is shaped like a keyhole, having one square end and one circular end, when viewed from above, with a total length of 111.0 metres (364.2 ft), orientated to the east. It is the largest found in Ise Province and the 4th largest in Mie Prefecture. It is estimated to have been built in the middle of the Kofun period in the early 5th century AD. Both fukiishi and haniwa have been found in profusion on the tumulus. The tumulus has a small rectangular stage extending from one side, presumably for ceremonial purposes. When it was re-evcavated by the Mie Prefectural Board of Education from 1999 to 2000, and numerous haniwa and other funerary objects were uncovered. These, as well as the artifacts uncovered in the 1928 excavations, are preserved at the Matsusaka City Cultural Center. Of especial note is a large boat-shaped haniwa, as well as haniwa in the shapes of single and multistory houses, and of men in armor. In 2006, these artifacts were collectively designated an National Important Cultural Property.

The details of the burial chamber, as the interior of the tumulus has not been excavated. Ground penetrating radar surveys indicate that a chamber with a length of approximately seven meters in a north–south alignment exists about 1.2 meters below the surface of the posterior circular portion; however, as the boat-shaped haniwa was found on the anterior portion of the tumulus, it is most probable that the tumulus contains multiple burial chambers in both sections. The boat-shaped haniwa was found in a niche created by breaking the fukiishi covering of the tumulus, indicating that it was placed at some point after the tumulus had been completed.

The tomb is attributed in local folklore to Otokazuchi-no-mikoto (乙加豆知命), the deified progenitor of the local Itaka clan.

Overall length
111 meters
Posterior circular portion
75 meter diameter x 10 meters high x 3 tiers
Anterior rectangular portion
66 meters wide x 8.1 meters high x 3 tiers

== Takarazuka Kofun No.2 ==
Slightly smaller than The Takarazuka Kofun No.1, this tomb is a hotategaigata-kofun (帆立貝型古墳), which is shaped like a scallop shell when viewed from above. It has an overall length of 90 meters and is orientated to the south-southwest. The posterior circular portion is constructed in three tiers, and the anterior rectangular portion in two-tiers; however, the eastern corner has been partially destroyed due to road construction, despite its official protected status. As with Kofun No.1, fukiishi and numerous haniwa have been uncovered. The details of burial chamber are unknown, as the tumulus has not yet been excavated, but from the structure and haniwa, it is estimated to date from the early 5th century AD.

Overall length
90 meters
Posterior circular portion
83 meter diameter x 10.5 meters high x 3 tiers
Anterior rectangular portion
40 meters wide x 17 meters long x 2.9 meters high x 2 tiers

Comparing the two tumuli, although the hotategaigata-kofun is usually considered inferior to the zenpō-kōen-fun in terms of status, the Takarazuka Kofun No.2 is larger than Takarazuka Kofun No.1, in terms of the diameter and height of the posterior circular portion, despite its shorter length.

== Gallery ==
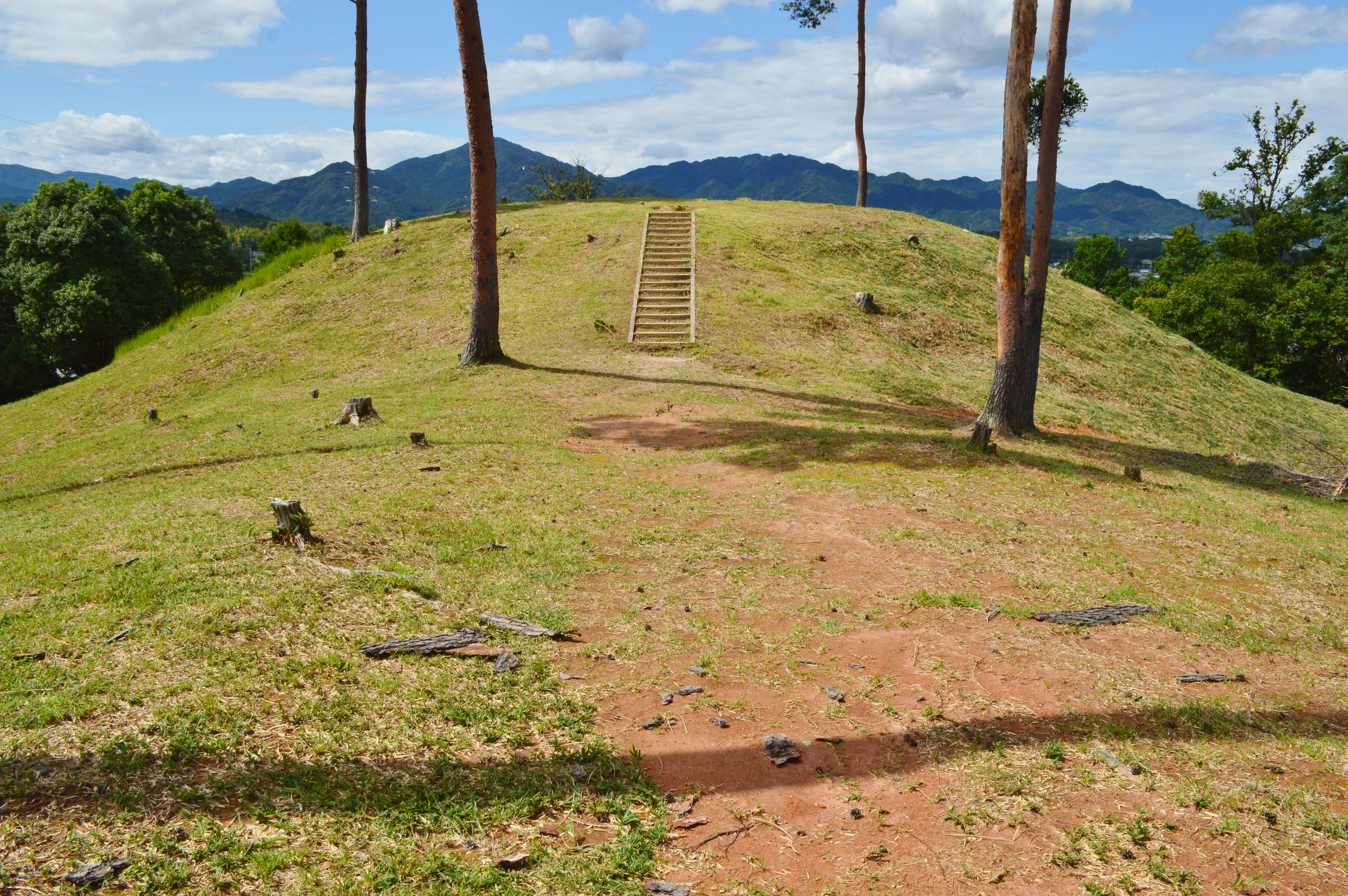
Takarazuka Kofun No.1

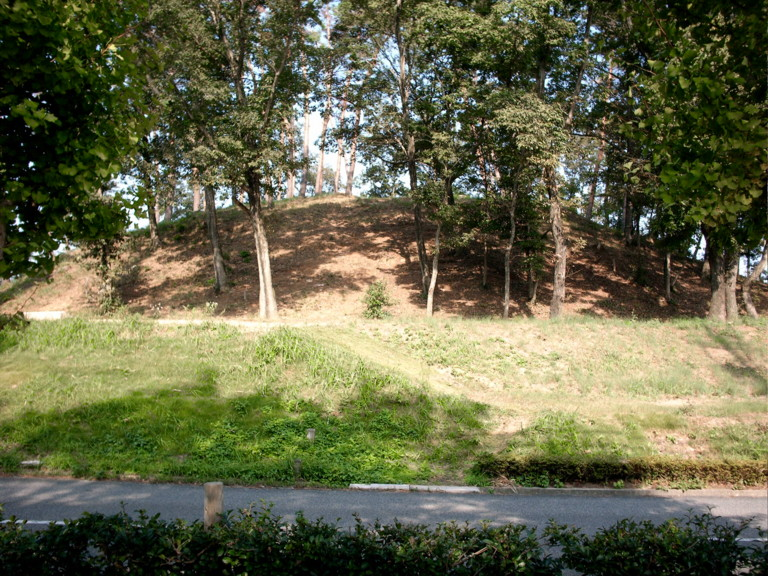
Takarazuka Kofun No.2

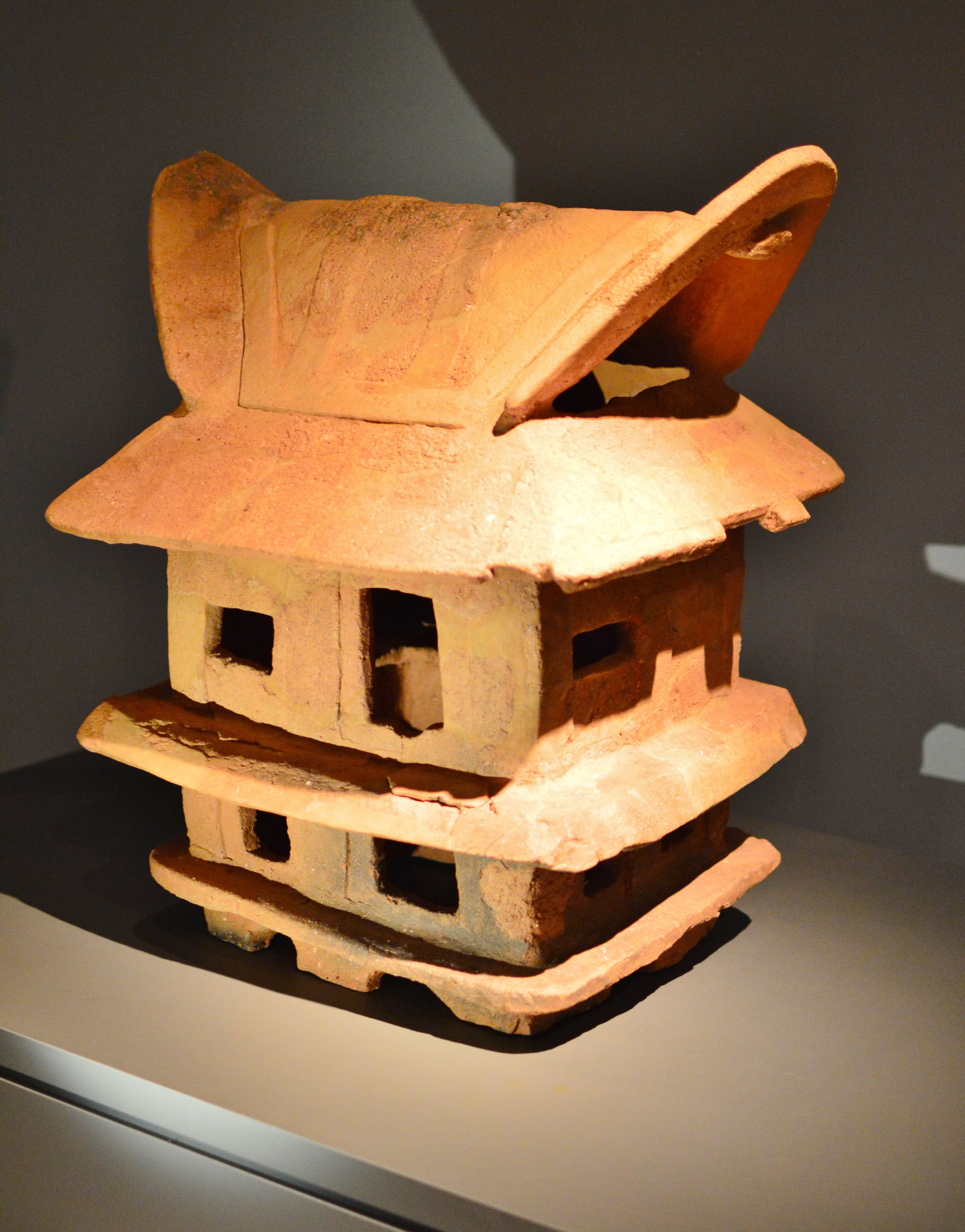
House-shaped haniwa

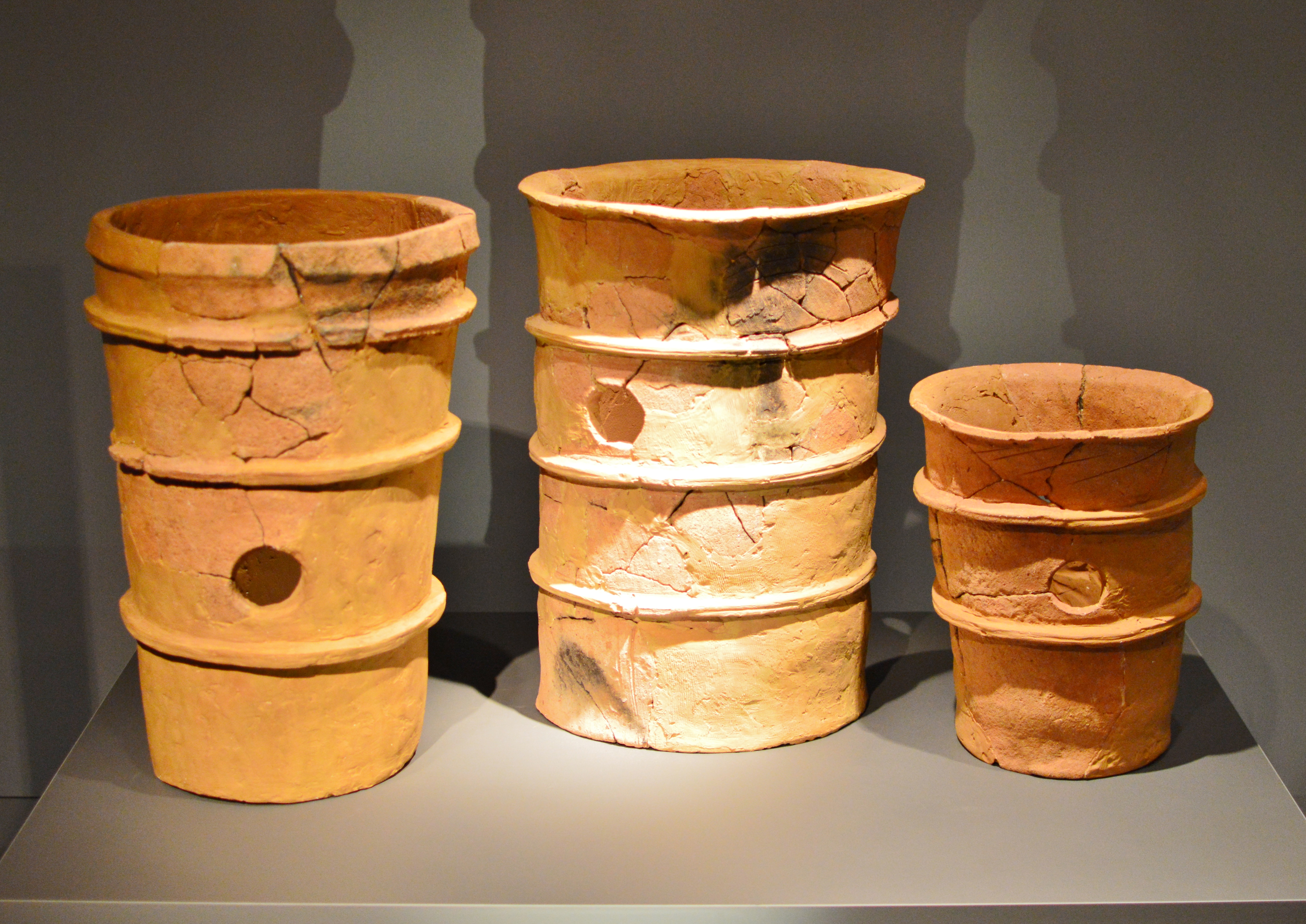
Cylindrical haniwa

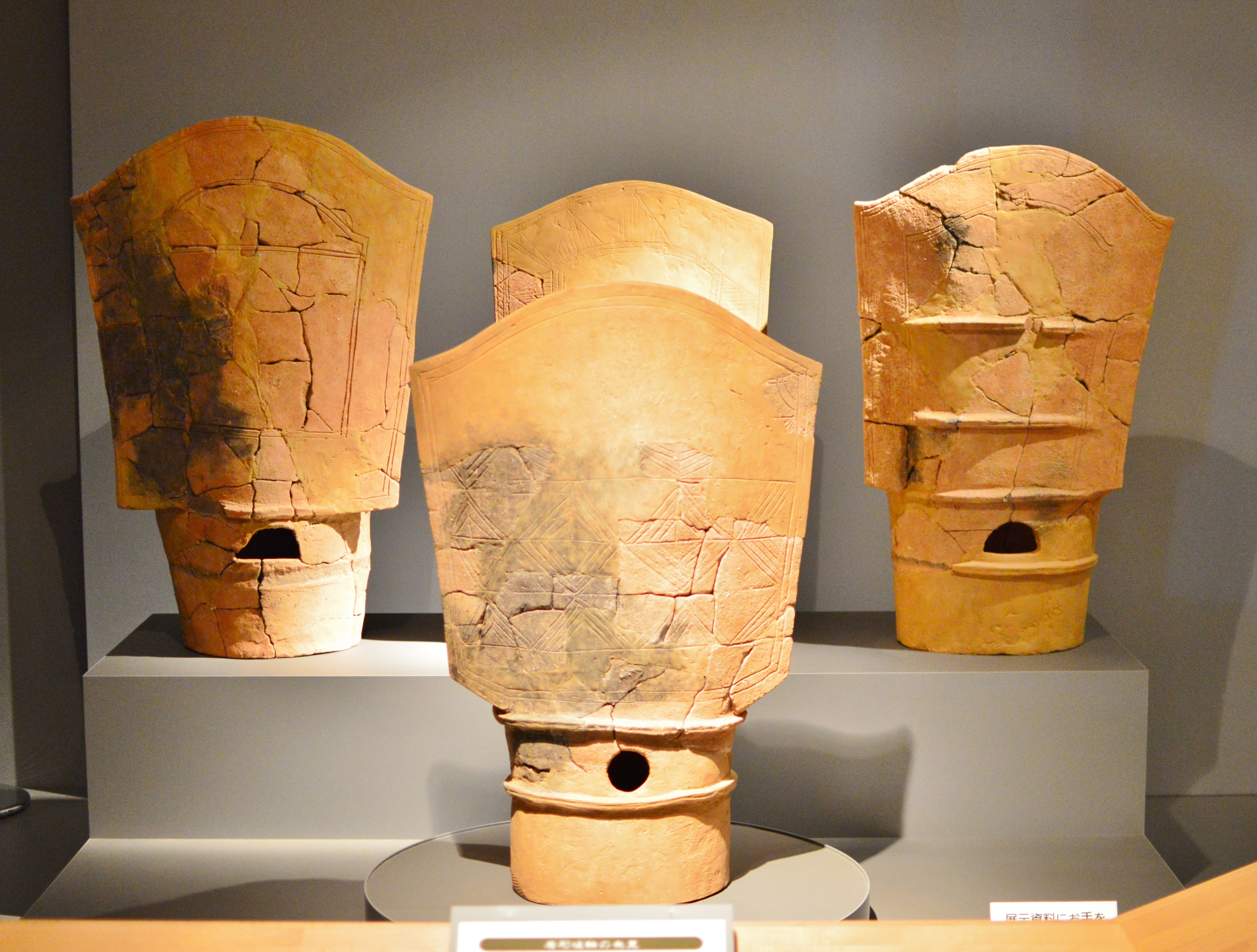
Shield-shaped haniwa

== See also ==
- List of Historic Sites of Japan (Mie)
