= Jōnokoshi Site =

Kofun period archaeological site in Iga, Kansai, Japan

Jōnokoshi site
- 城之越遺跡 (Japanese)
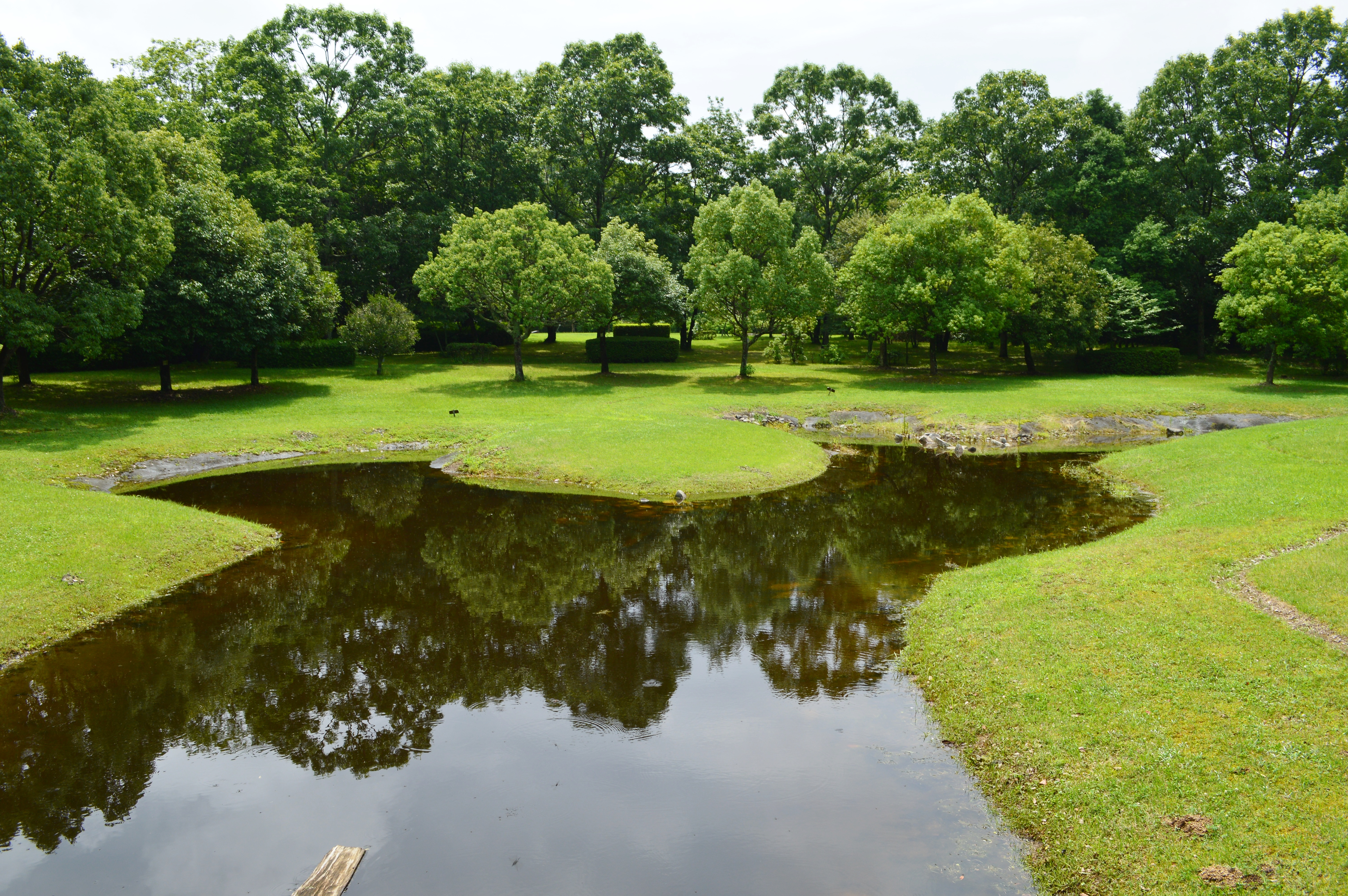
- Jōnokoshi site

- Jōnokoshi site Jōnokoshi Site (Japan)
- 34°40′44″N 136°09′46″E
- Type: settlement
- Periods: Kofun period
- Location: Iga, Mie, Japan
- Region: Kansai region

Site notes
- Public access: Yes (archaeological park)

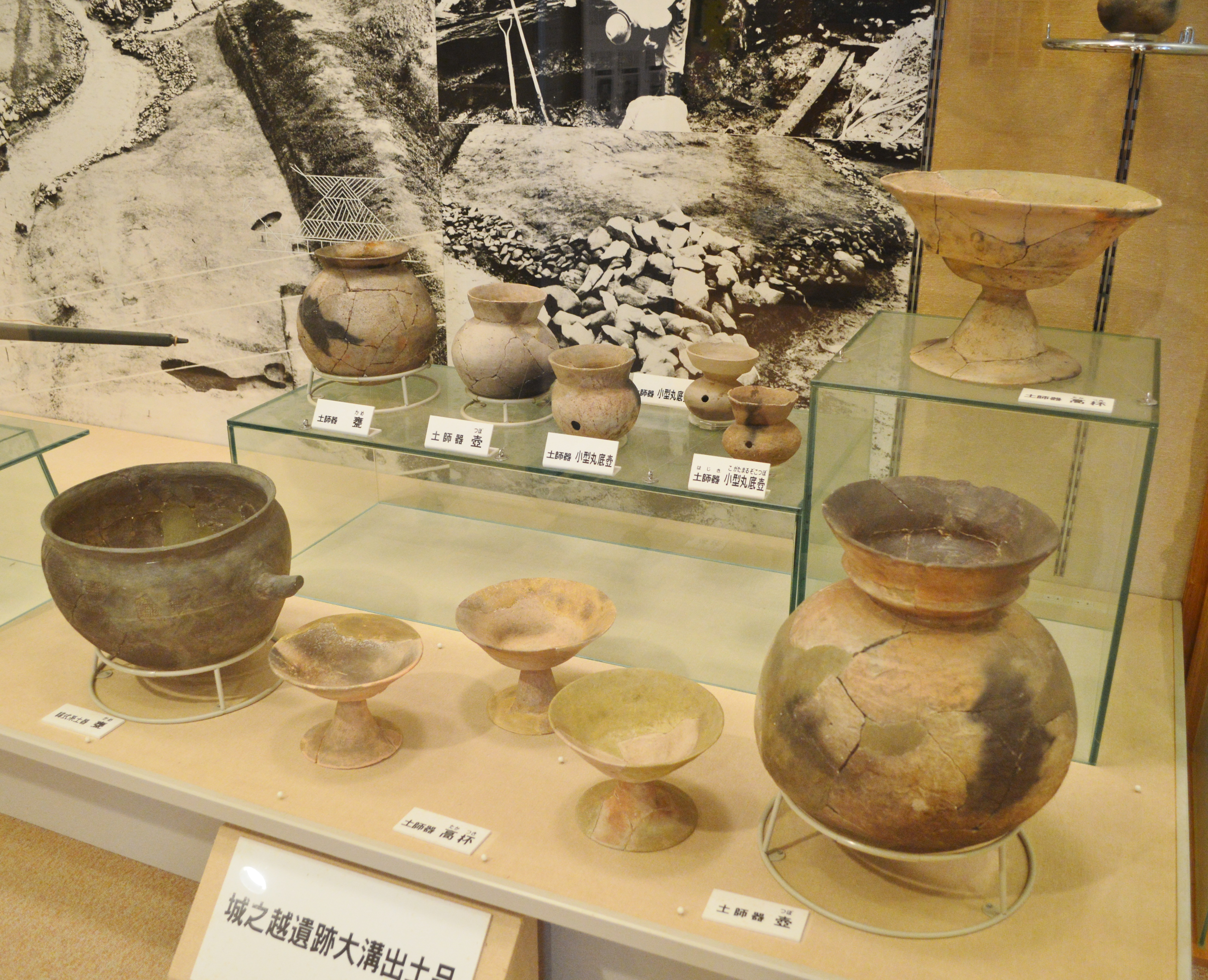
Pottery found at Jōnokoshi Site

The Jōnokoshi site (城之越遺跡, Jōnokoshi iseki) is an archaeological site containing the ruins of a Kofun period settlement and ritual site located in the Hido neighborhood of the city of Iga in the Kansai region of Japan. It was designated as both a National Historic Site of Japan and a National Place of Scenic Beauty in 1993.

== Overview ==
The Jōnokoshi Site is located at the eastern end of a 1.5 km square basin surrounded by low hills in the southernmost part of the former Ueno city. The Kizu RIver is about 700 meters to the west of the ruins. As the result of an archaeological excavation in 1991 in conjunction with a prefectural field maintenance project, three large ditches with spring water sources and a group of more than 29 pit dwellings and 50 excavated pillar buildings from the Kofun period was discovered. The extent of the settlement was about 13,000 square meters. While Kofun period settlement traces are not uncommon, the distinctive feature of this site is its advanced system of waterworks, with a series of artificial ponds connected by channels of approximately two meters in width, and both standing and stepped stones arranged to control the flow of water. The site has several settlement layers. The waterworks date from the latter half of the 4th century AD, or the end of the early Kofun period. Subsequently, the system's improved with revetment stones, standing stones and a box-like structure which appears to have been a ritual site. Towards the end of the Kofun period, much of the earlier waterworks had been buried and the settlement area expanded to include many warehouse-type buildings. Many earthenware jars and cups have been found, along with wooden artifacts indicating that this was a ritual site connected with sacred springs rather than a normal agricultural settlement. The meandering system of ponds and channels exhibit an aesthetic sense and thus this site can be seen as a forerunner of the traditional Japanese garden.

The site was opened to the public as an archaeological park in 1997. It is located about five minutes on foot from Hido Station on the Iga Railway.

== See also ==
- List of Historic Sites of Japan (Mie)
