= Shinsei Shōnin =

Shinsei Shōnin (sometimes spelled Shinzei, 真盛, 1443–1495), was a priest of the Tendai school during the Sengoku period (period of warring states). He was the founder of the Shinsei School (天台真盛宗) of Tendai. His shigo (posthumous title) was Enkai Kokushi ("National Teacher of Perfect Command") and Jishō Daishi ("The Great Teacher Jishō").

Shinsei is primarily associated with his attempts to revitalize Tendai nembutsu practice in response to the new Japanese Pure Land schools which had split off from Tendai, mainly the Jōdo-shū and Jōdo Shinshū.

== Overview ==
Shinsei was born in Ise Province, and his father was Koizumi Sakon no Jō Fujiyoshi (Lieutenant of the Left Division of Inner Palace Guards). He was reputed to be a 17th-generation descendant of Ki no Tsurayuki. His secular name was Koizumi.

At the age of seven, Shinsei entered Kōmyō-ji in Ise. He received ordination and tonsure at fourteen, taking the religious name Shinsei. He was then initiated into Tendai esotericism (Taimitsu) at Mitsuzō-in in the province of Owari. At the age of nineteen, Shinsei traveled to Mount Hiei, where he studied doctrine and meditation under Keishū in the Saitō (Western Section) of the mountain. He remained on Mount Hiei for twenty years without descending. At forty-one, he retired to Kurodani Seiryū-ji Temple, a secluded location on Mount Hiei where Hōnen had once lived. There, he devoted himself to the nembutsu (the invocation of Buddha Amida's name), basing his practice on Genshin's Ōjōyōshū (The Essentials of Birth).

Shinsei emphasized the joint practice of keeping Buddhist precepts and the invocation of the nembutsu (kaishō-itchi). He traveled extensively, preaching in Ōmi, Ise, and Echizen, spreading his teachings at the Imperial Court, to court nobles and ladies, as well as provincial constables (shugo). His reputation as an ascetic devoted to nembutsu practice earned him great respect.

Shinsei played a significant role in the restoration of Saikyō-ji Temple in Sakamoto, Ōmi Province, where Ryōgen and Genshin had once lived. The temple had been previously designated by Enkan as the main temple for Endonkai (Perfect and Sudden Precepts). Shinsei reestablished Saikyō-ji as the head temple of the new Shinsei School of Tendai Buddhism.

Shinsei administered Buddhist precepts to members of the imperial family, shōgun, and provincial military governors (shugo), who in turn granted him their patronage. His devout practice and teaching gained him a large following. During his lifetime, Emperor Go-Tsuchimikado honored him with the title "Shōnin" ("Saint"). After his death, Emperor Go-Kashiwabara granted him the posthumous title Enkai Kokushi ("National Teacher of Perfect Command").

Shinsei died at the age of fifty-three at Sairen-ji Temple in Iga Province. His teachings and the Shinsei-ha branch of Tendai Buddhism continued to influence later generations, solidifying his place as a prominent figure in Japanese Buddhist history. According to Richard K. Payne "today, after almost five centuries, the Shinzei-ha is the third largest subsect of Tendai. The Saikyo-ji remains the headquarters of the Shinzei-ha, and there are "approximately 430 branch temples in Omi, Ise and Echizen regions."

The Taishō edition of the Buddhist canon contains two key works by Shinsei, the Sōshin hōgo (T 2420) and the Nembutsu zammai hōgo (Discourse on Practicing the Samadhi of Meditating on the Buddha, T 2421).

== See also ==
- Genshin
