= Tsukigaseguchi Station =

Railway station in Minamiyamashiro, Kyoto Prefecture, Japan

Tsukigaseguchi Station 月ヶ瀬口駅
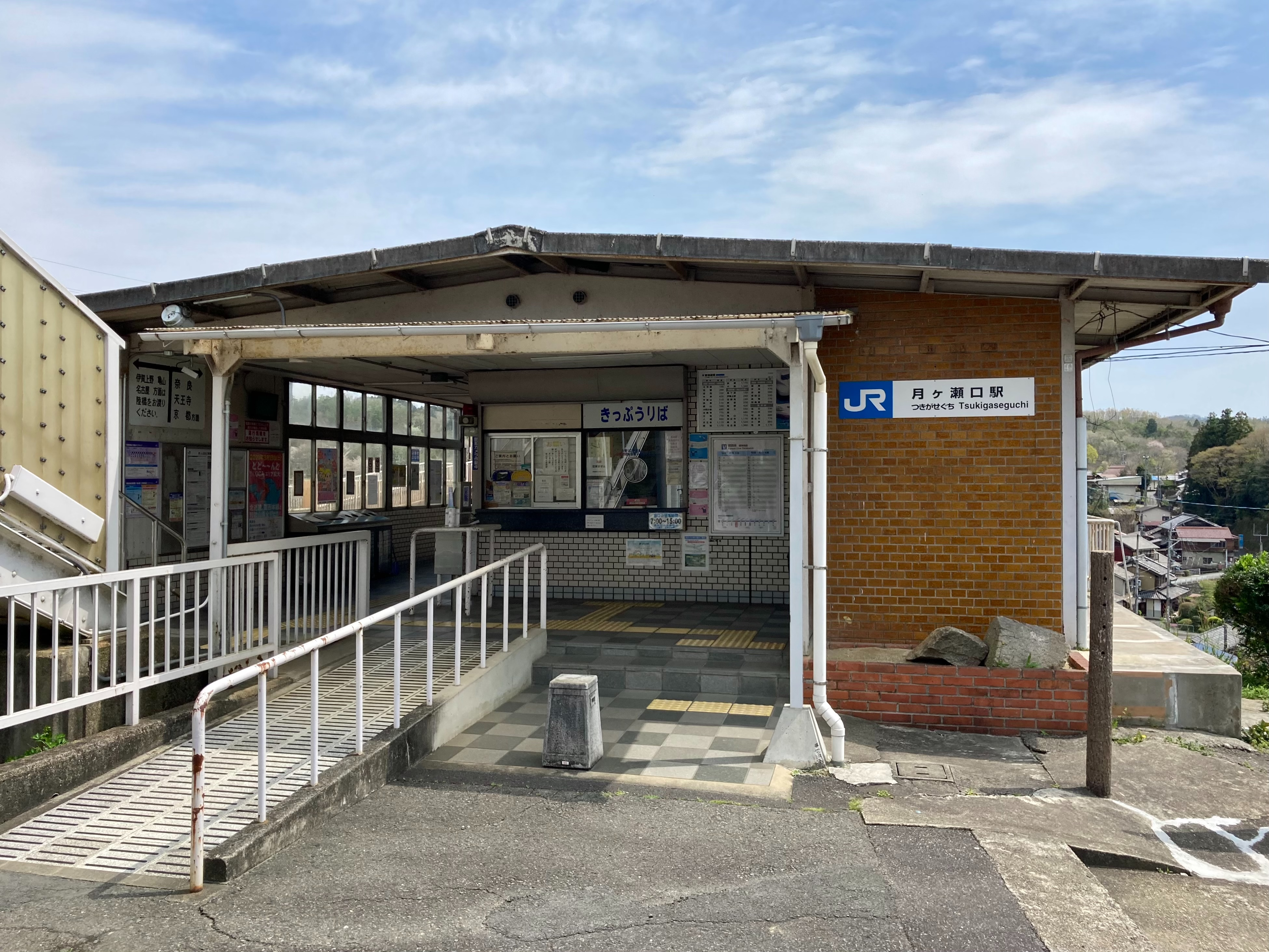
- Tsukigaseguchi Station, April 2021

General information
- Location: Tondahirao, Ōaza Kitaōkawara, Minamiyamashiro-mura, Soraku-gun, Kyoto-fu 619-1411; Japan
- Coordinates: 34°45′46″N 136°01′25″E
- System: JR-West regional rail station
- Owner: JR-West
- Line: V Kansai Main Line
- Distance: 44.9 km (27.9 miles) from Kameyama
- Platforms: 2 side platforms
- Tracks: 2
- Train operators: JR-West
- Bus stands: 1
- Connections: Bus stop

Construction
- Structure type: At grade
- Cycle facilities: Available
- Accessible: None

Other information
- Website: Official website (in Japanese)

History
- Opened: 28 December 1951

Passengers
- FY 2023: 198 daily

Services
Preceding station	JR West	Following station
Ōkawara towards Kamo	Kansai Line	Shimagahara towards Nagoya
Location
- Location within Kyoto Prefecture Location within Japan

Tsukigaseguchi Station (月ヶ瀬口駅, Tsukigaseguchi-eki) is a passenger railway station operated by West Japan Railway Company (JR-West) in the village of Minamiyamashiro, Kyoto, Japan.

== Lines ==
Tsukigaseguchi Station is served by the Kansai Main Line, and lies 44.9 km (27.9 miles) from the starting point of the line at Kameyama.

== Layout ==
The station has two unnumbered opposed side platforms serving two tracks, connected by a footbridge. The station is staffed. Automatic ticket vending machines are not installed, and tickets are only issued by POS terminals.

=== Platforms ===
Westbound	■ V Kansai Main Line	for Kamo
Eastbound	■ V Kansai Main Line	for Kameyama, Tsuge, and Iga-Ueno

== History ==
Tsukigaseguchi Station opened on 28 December 1951. With the privatization of Japanese National Railways (JNR) on 1 April 1987, the station came under the control of JR West.

== Passenger statistics ==
According to the Kyoto Prefecture statistical book, the average number of passengers per day is as follows.

Year	Passengers
2008	255
2009	219
2010	216
2011	216
2012	216
2013	205
2014	184
2015	186
2016	164
2017	136
2019	115

== Surrounding area ==
- Japan National Route 163
- Rokusho Shrine (Tsushima Shrine)

== See also ==
- List of railway stations in Japan
