= Sanagu Station =

Railway station in Iga, Mie Prefecture, Japan

Sanagu Station 佐那具駅
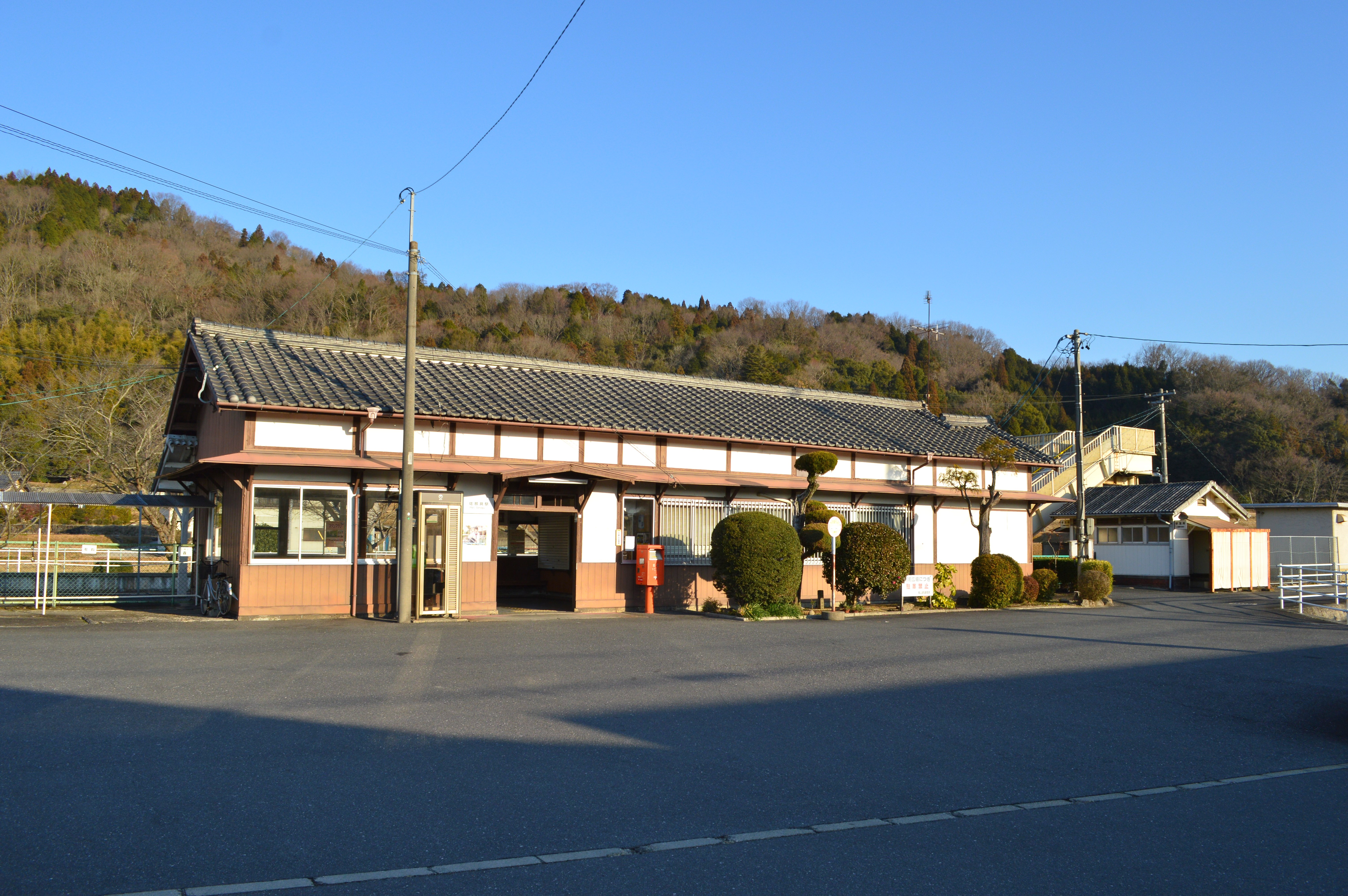
- Sanagu Station in January 2015

General information
- Location: 281, Sotoyama, Iga-shi, Mie-ken 518-0011; Japan
- Coordinates: 34°48′16″N 136°09′50″E
- System: JR West regional rail station
- Owner: JR West
- Operator: Steering Committee for Business in Sanagu Station Premise
- Lines: Passenger train services: V Kansai Line; Railway track: Kansai Main Line
- Distance: 30.6 km (19.0 miles) from Kameyama
- Platforms: 2 side platforms
- Train operators: JR West
- Bus stands: 1
- Connections: Mie Kotsu: 16 at Sanagu-ekimae

Construction
- Structure type: At grade
- Cycle facilities: Available
- Accessible: No

Other information
- Website: Official website

History
- Opened: 15 January 1897

Passengers
- FY 2023: 164 daily
Services
Preceding station	JRW	Following station
Iga-Ueno toward Kamo	Kansai Line	Shindō toward Kameyama and Tsuge
Terminus	Kansai Line	Shindō toward Kameyama and Tsuge
Location
- Location within Mie Prefecture Location within Japan

Sanagu Station (佐那具駅, Sanagu-eki) is a passenger railway station of the West Japan Railway Company (JR-West) located in the city of Iga, Mie, Japan.

== Lines ==
Sanagu Station is served by the Kansai Main Line, and is located 90.5 rail kilometres from the terminus of the line at Nagoya Station and 30.6 rail kilometers from Kameyama Station.

== Layout ==
The station consists of two side platforms serving two tracks, connected by a footbridge.

=== Platforms ===
Westbound	■ Kansai Line	for Kamo and Iga-Ueno
Eastbound	■ Kansai Line	for Kameyama and Tsuge

== History ==
Sanagu Station was opened on January 15, 1897 with the extension of the Kansai Railway from Tsuge Station to Iga-Ueno Station. The Kansai Railway was nationalized on October 1, 1907, becoming part of the Imperial Government Railways (IGR), which became Japan National Railways (JNR) after World War II. Freight operations were discontinued from August 1, 1970. With the privatization of JNR on April 1, 1987, the station came under the control of JR-West.

== Bus service ==
Mie Kotsu: 26 (Tamataki Line): Ayama Branch, for Uenoshi Station

== Passenger statistics ==
In fiscal 2019, the station was used by an average of 105 passengers daily (boarding passengers only).

== Surrounding area ==
- Yamato Kaido Sanagu Honjin ruins
- Japan National Route 25
- Fuchu Shrine
- Ryogen-ji Temple

== See also ==
- List of railway stations in Japan
