= Ōkawara Station =

Railway station in Minamiyamashiro, Kyoto Prefecture, Japan

Ōkawara Station 大河原駅
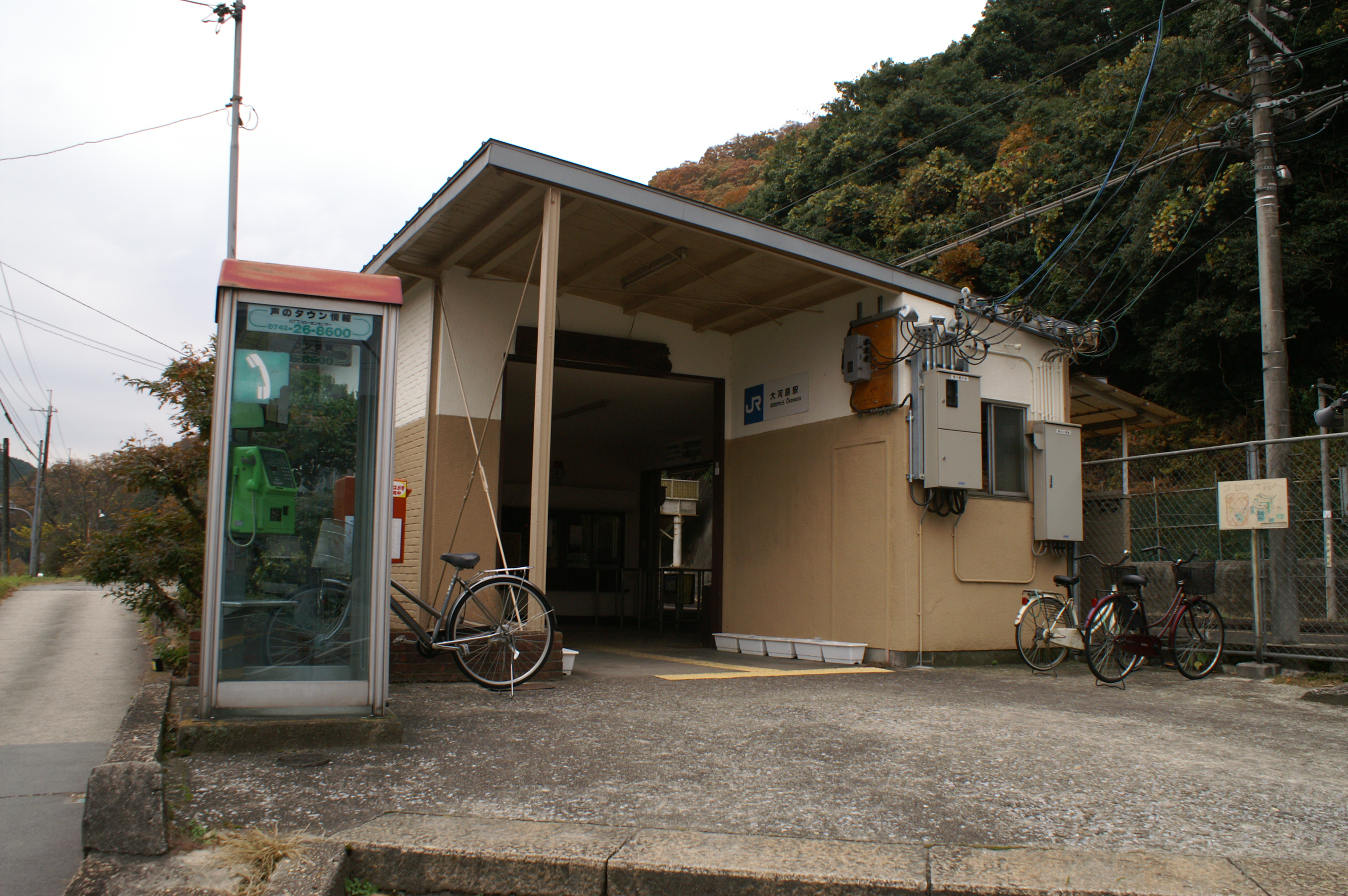
- Ōkawara Station in November 2006

General information
- Location: Aza Kakegahara, Ōaza Kitaōkawara, Minamiyamashiro-mura, Sōraku-gun, Kyoto-fu 619-1411; Japan
- Coordinates: 34°46′18″N 135°59′16″E
- System: JR West regional rail station
- Owner: JR West
- Line: V Kansai Main Line
- Distance: 48.9 km (30.4 miles) from Kameyama
- Platforms: 2 side platforms
- Tracks: 2
- Train operators: JR West
- Connections: Minamiyamashiro Village Community Bus: Bound for Ōkawara and bound for Nodono / Dōsenbō at Yamanami Hall

Construction
- Structure type: At grade
- Cycle facilities: Available
- Accessible: None

Other information
- Website: Official website

History
- Opened: 11 November 1897
- Rebuilt: 1954

Passengers
- FY 2023: 70 daily
Services
Preceding station	JRW	Following station
Kasagi toward Kamo	Kansai Line	Tsukigaseguchi toward Kameyama, Tsuge, and Iga-Ueno
Location
- Location within Kyoto Prefecture Location within Japan

Ōkawara Station (大河原駅, Ōkawara-eki) is a passenger railway station of West Japan Railway Company (JR-West) located in the village of Minamiyamashiro, Kyoto, Japan.

== Lines ==
Ōkawara Station is served by the Kansai Main Line, and is located 48.9 km (30.4 miles) from the terminus of the line at Kameyama.

== Layout ==
The station has two opposed unnumbered side platforms. The platforms and the station building are connected by a footbridge. The station is staffed.

=== Platforms ===
Westbound	■ V Kansai Main Line	for Kamo
Eastbound	■ V Kansai Main Line	for Kameyama, Tsuge, and Iga-Ueno

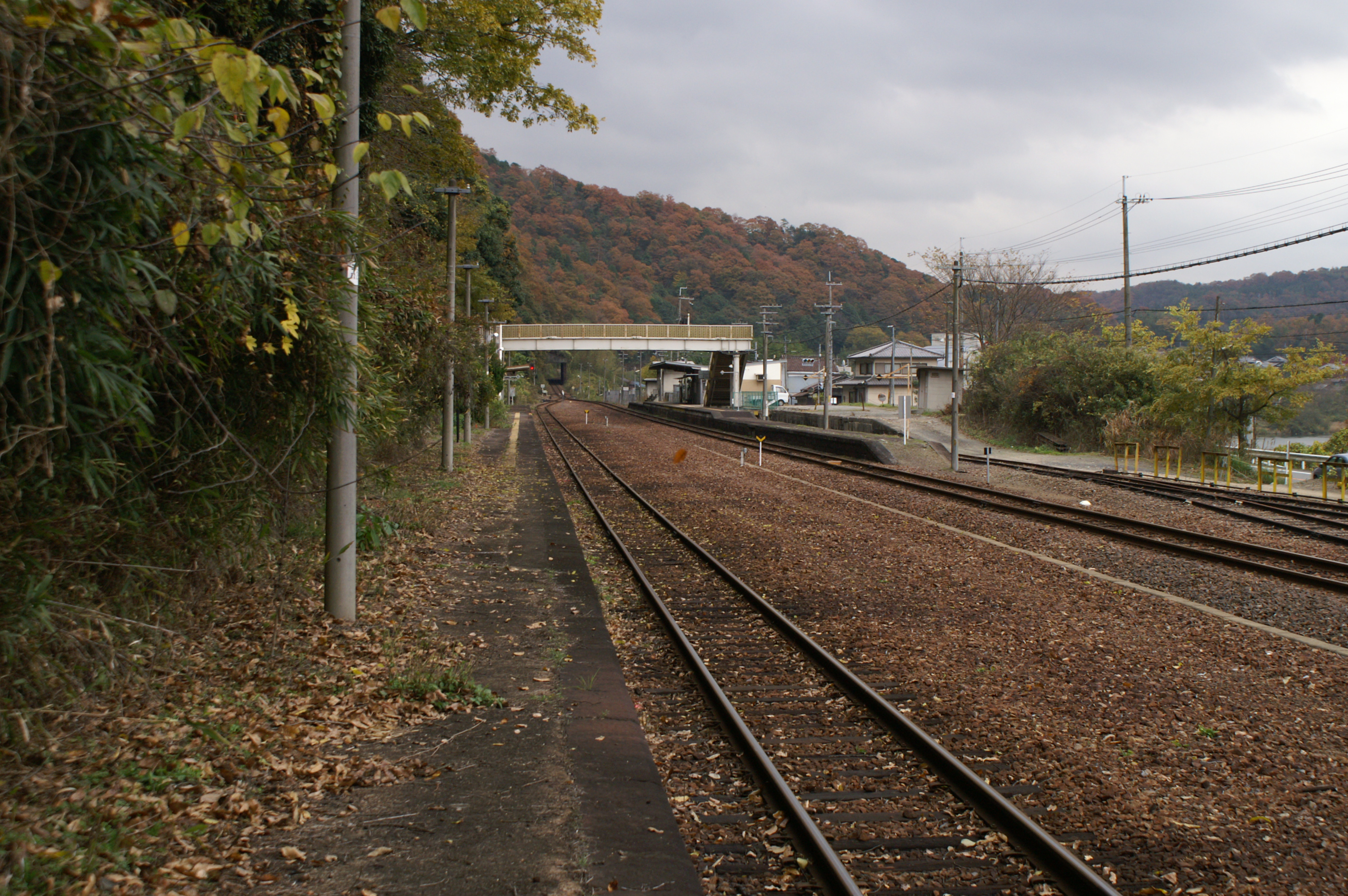
The station yard in November 2006

== History ==
Ōkawara Station opened on 11 November 1897 as a station on the Kansai Railway. The Kansai Railway was nationalized in 1907 and the line renamed the Kansai Main Line in 1909. The station building was destroyed by a flood on 15 August 1953, and was rebuilt on 31 March 1954. With the privatization of Japanese National Railways (JNR) on 1 April 1987, the station came under the control of JR West.

== Passenger statistics ==
According to the Kyoto Prefecture statistical report, the average number of passengers per day is as follows.

Year	Passengers
2008	93
2009	77
2010	66
2011	66
2012	71
2013	68
2014	63
2015	63
2016	60
2017	52
2018	44
2019	38

== Surrounding area ==
- Japan National Route 163
- Minamiyamashiro Village Office

== See also ==
- List of railway stations in Japan
