= Kasagi Station =

Railway station in Kasagi, Kyoto Prefecture, Japan

Kasagi Station 笠置駅
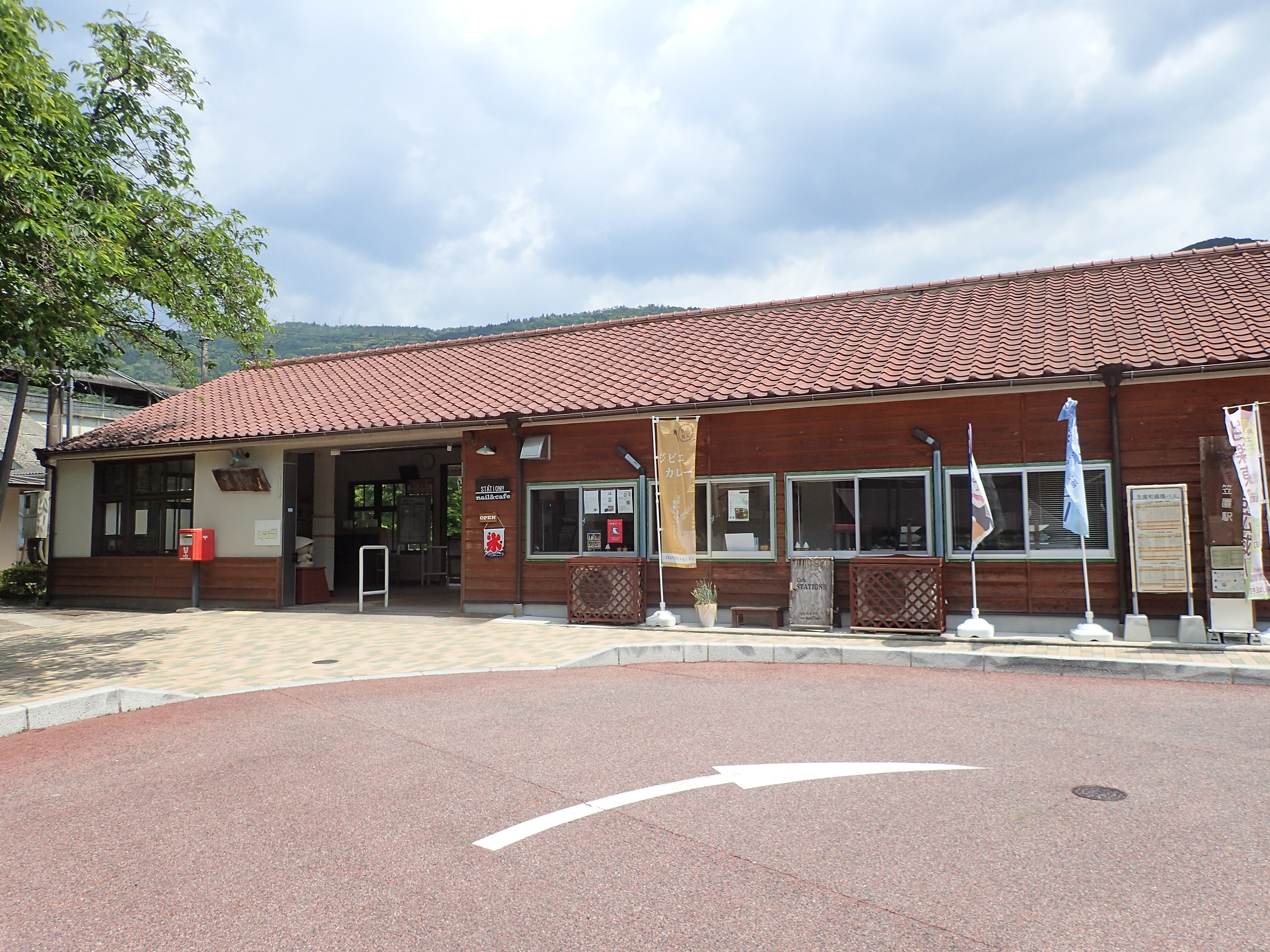
- Kasagi Station in May 2022

General information
- Location: Ōaza Kasagi, Kasagi-chō, Sōraku-gun, Kyoto-fu 619-1303; Japan
- Coordinates: 34°45′33″N 135°56′03″E
- System: JR West regional rail station
- Owner: JR West
- Line: V Kansai Main Line
- Distance: 54.3 km (33.7 miles) from Kameyama
- Platforms: 1 island platform
- Tracks: 3 (1 disused)
- Train operators: JR West
- Connections: Kasagi Municipal Circular Bus: (Registered residents only)

Construction
- Structure type: At grade
- Cycle facilities: Available
- Accessible: None

Other information
- Website: Official website

History
- Opened: 11 November 1897

Passengers
- FY 2023: 246 daily
Services
Preceding station	JRW	Following station
Kamo; Terminus	Kansai Line	Ōkawara toward Kameyama, Tsuge, and Iga-Ueno
Location
- Location within Kyoto Prefecture Location within Japan

Kasagi Station (笠置駅, Kasagi-eki) is a passenger railway station of West Japan Railway Company (JR-West) located in the town of Kasagi, Kyoto, Japan. The station is outside of the ICOCA service area, so no IC cards can be used to pay fares.

== Lines ==
Kasagi Station is served by the Kansai Main Line, and is located at 54.3 km (33.7 miles) from the terminus of the line at Kameyama.

== Layout ==
The station has one island platform connected to the station building by a footbridge. The station is staffed. A coin locker is installed.

=== Platforms ===
1	■ V Kansai Main Line	for Kamo
2	■ V Kansai Main Line	for Kameyama, Tsuge, and Iga-Ueno

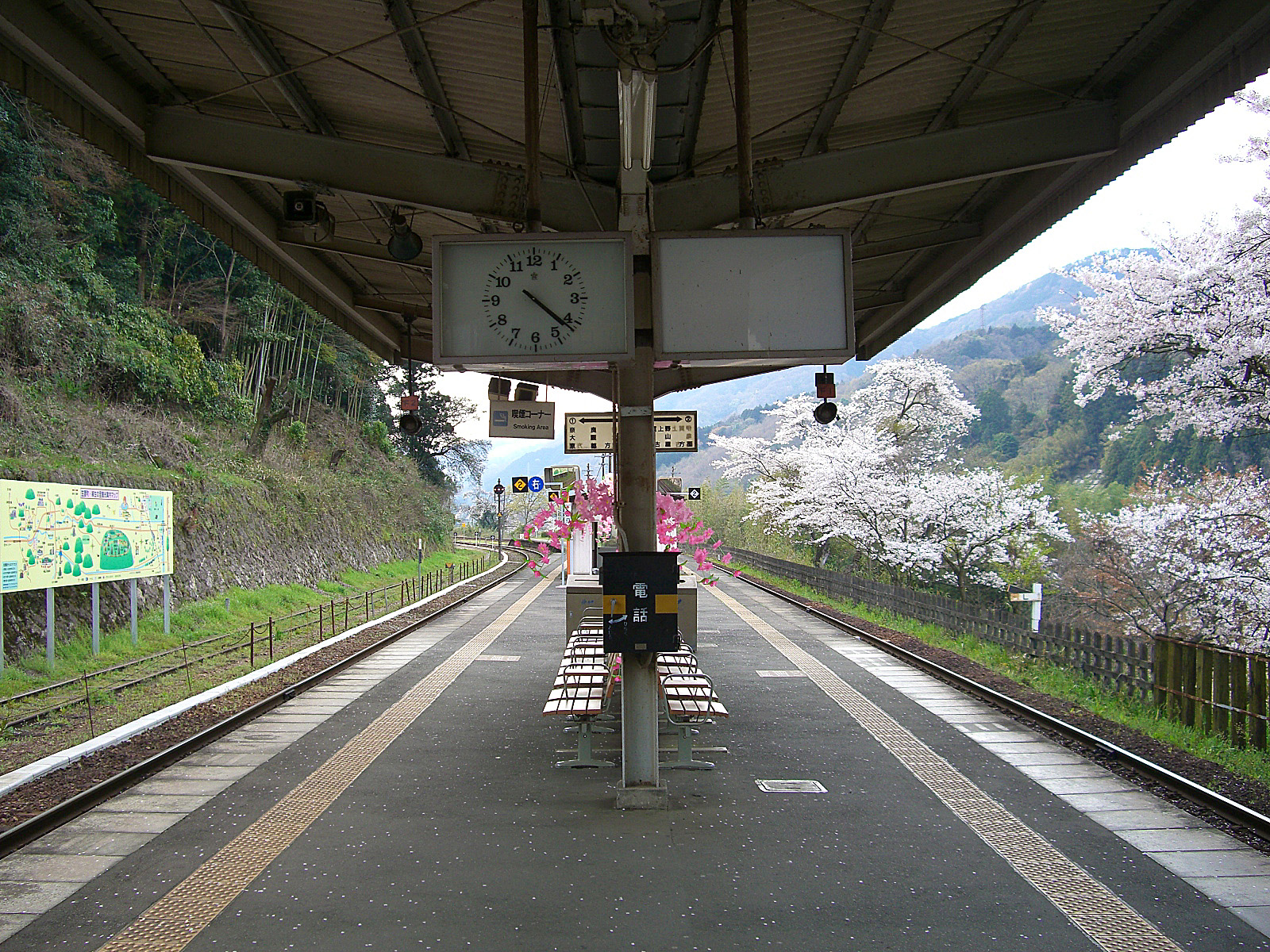
The platform in April 2007

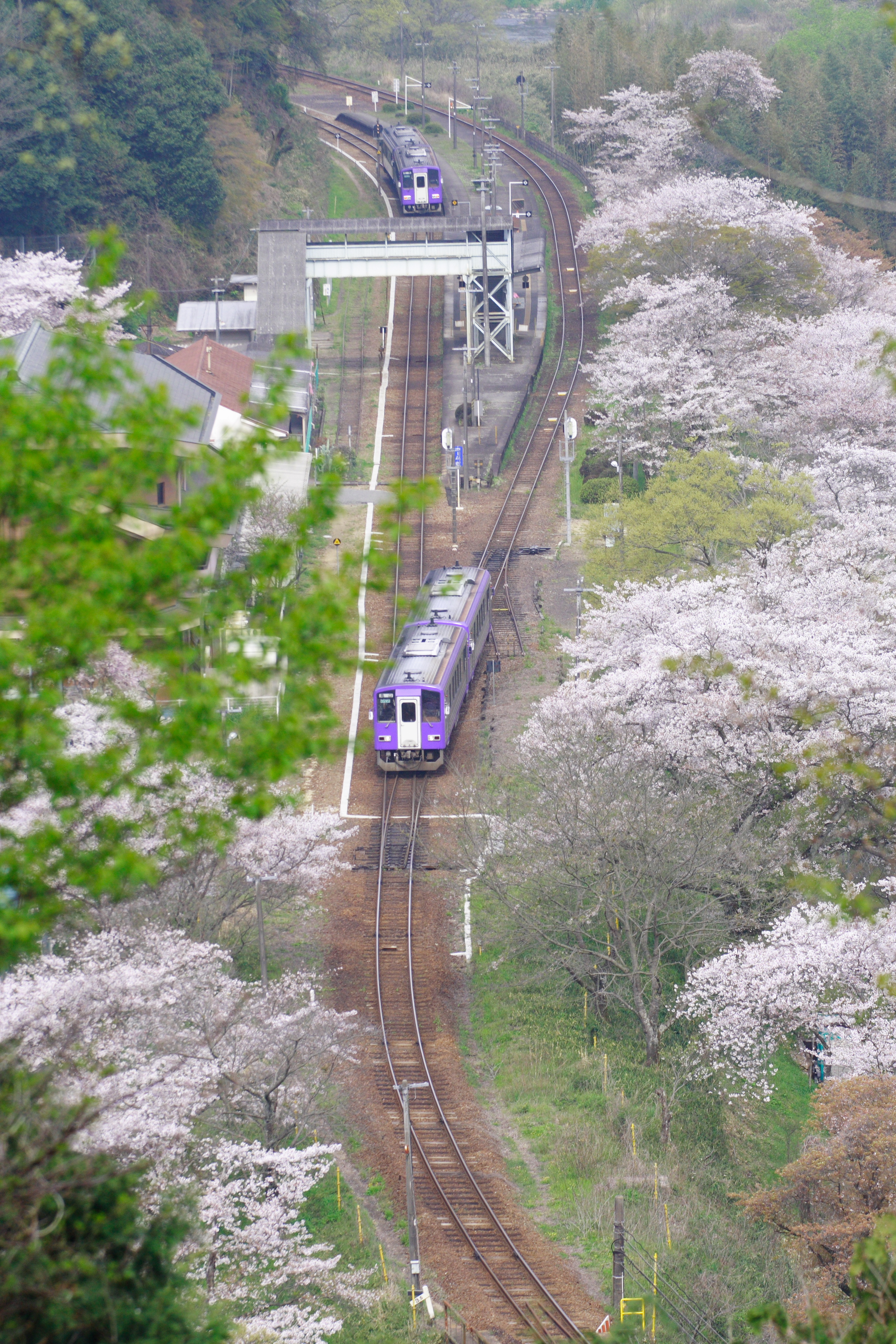
The station structure in April 2007

== History ==
Kasagi Station opened on 11 November 1897 as a station on the Kansai Railway. The Kansai Railway was nationalized in 1907 and the line renamed the Kansai Main Line in 1909. With the privatization of Japanese National Railways (JNR) on 1 April 1987, the station came under the control of JR West.

Year	Passengers
2008	326
2009	315
2010	310
2011	320
2012	296
2013	285
2014	268
2015	257
2016	233
2017	219
2018	200
2019	186

== Surrounding area ==
This station is located in an area where the Kansai Main Line runs parallel to the south bank of the Kizugawa River and National Route 163 runs parallel to the north bank, and is surrounded by mountains. Kasagi Ohashi Bridge is built on the east side of the station as a bridge connecting north and south. Kasagi once prospered as a hot spring town, and hot spring inns were built on both banks of the Kizugawa River

- Kasagi Town Hall
- Kasagiyama Prefectural Natural Park

== See also ==
- List of railway stations in Japan
