= Shimagahara Station =

Railway station in Iga, Mie Prefecture, Japan

Shimagahara Station 島ヶ原駅
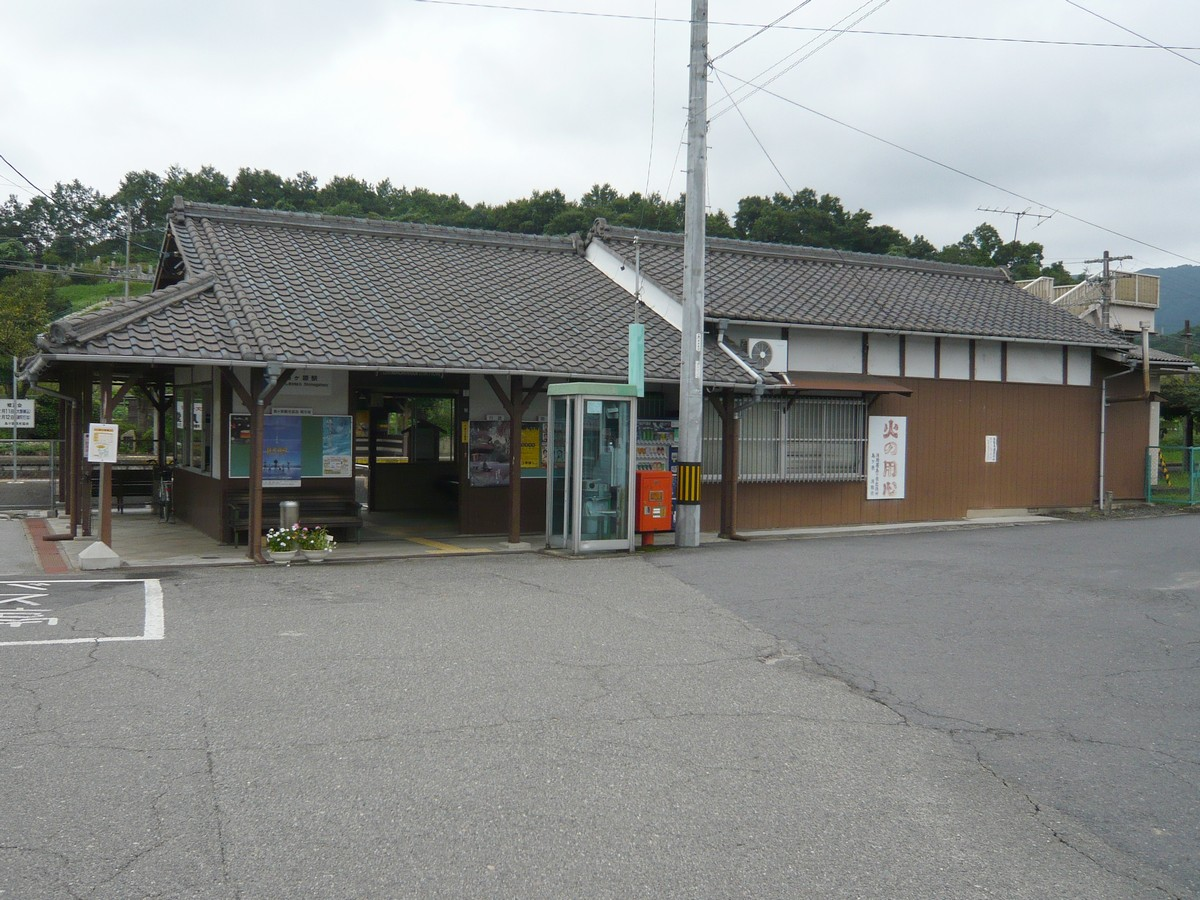
- Shimagahara Station

General information
- Location: 5770, Shimagahara, Iga-shi, Mie-ken 519-1704; Japan
- Coordinates: 34°46′3.67″N 136°3′15.06″E
- System: JR West regional rail station
- Owner: JR West
- Lines: Passenger train services: V Kansai Line; Railway track: Kansai Main Line
- Distance: 41.9 km (26.0 miles) from Kameyama
- Platforms: 2 side platforms
- Tracks: 2
- Train operators: JR West
- Bus stands: 1
- Connections: Mie Kotsu: 43 at Shimagahara-ekimae; Iga City Administrative Bus: Shimagahara Administrative Traveling Service Car at Shimagahara-ekimae

Construction
- Structure type: At grade
- Cycle facilities: Available
- Accessible: None

Other information
- Website: Official website

History
- Opened: 11 November 1897

Passengers
- FY 2023: 182 daily
Services
Preceding station	JRW	Following station
Tsukigaseguchi toward Kamo	Kansai Line	Iga-Ueno toward Kameyama and Tsuge
Location
- Location within Mie Prefecture Location within Japan

Shimagahara Station (島ヶ原駅, Shimagahara-eki) is a passenger railway station of the West Japan Railway Company (JR-West) located in the city of Iga, Mie, Japan.

== Lines ==
Shimagahara Station is served by the Kansai Main Line, and is located 101.8 rail kilometres from the terminus of the line at Nagoya Station and 41.9 rail kilometers from Kameyama Station.

== Layout ==
The station consists of two side platforms serving one track each, connected by a footbridge. Automatic ticket vending machines are not installed, as tickets are only issued by POS terminals.

=== Platforms ===
Westbound	■ Kansai Line	for Kamo
Eastbound	■ Kansai Line	for Kameyama, Tsuge, and Iga-Ueno

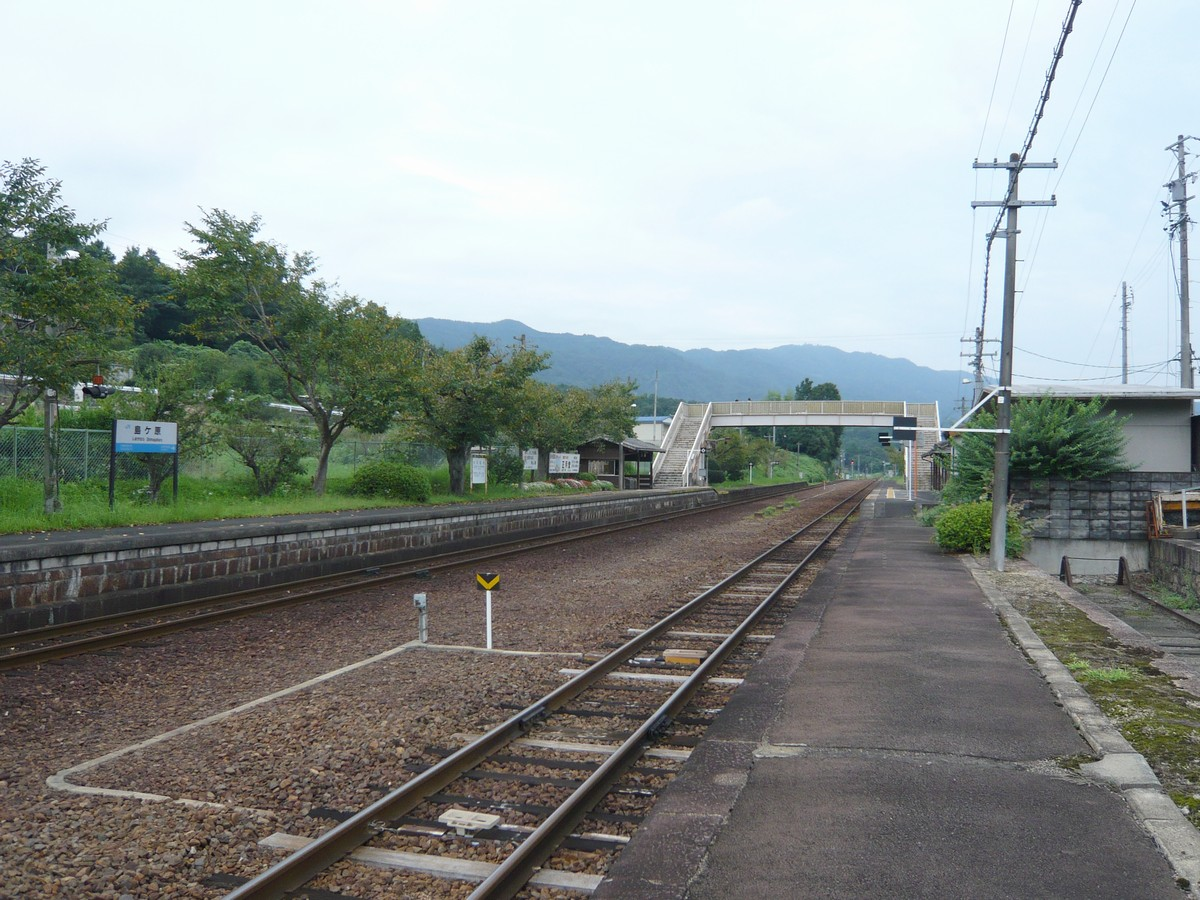
Shimagahara Station platforms

== History ==
Shimagahara Station was opened on November 11, 1897, with the extension of the Kansai Railway from Iga-Ueno Station to Kamo Station. The Kansai Railway was nationalized on October 1, 1907, becoming part of the Imperial Government Railways (IGR), which became Japan National Railways (JNR) after World War II. Freight operations were discontinued from August 1, 1970. With the privatization of JNR on April 1, 1987, the station came under the control of JR-West.

== Passenger statistics ==
In fiscal 2019, the station was used by an average of 113 passengers daily (boarding passengers only).

== Surrounding area ==
- Shimagahara Post Office
- Kizu River

== See also ==
- List of railway stations in Japan
