= Sangō Station (Nara) =

Railway station in Sangō, Nara Prefecture, Japan

Sangō Station 三郷駅
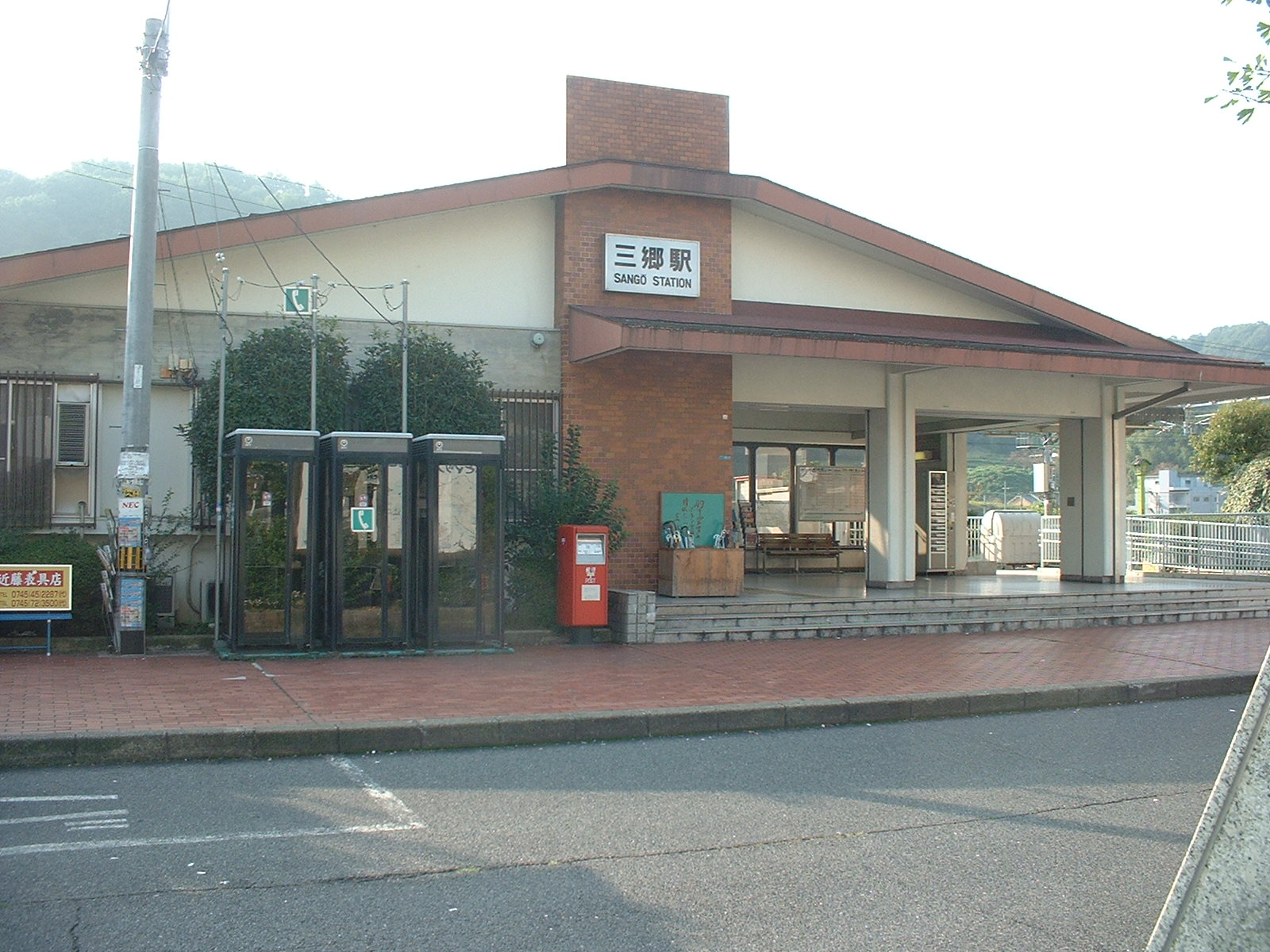
- Sangō Station

General information
- Location: 10-17, Tatsunominami 2-chome, Sangō-chō, Ikoma-gun, Nara-ken 636-0822; Japan
- Coordinates: 34°35′21″N 135°41′15″E
- Operator: JR West
- Line: Q Yamatoji Line
- Distance: 30.2 km from Kamo
- Platforms: 2 side platforms
- Connections: Bus stop

Construction
- Structure type: Ground level

Other information
- Station code: JR-Q30
- Website: Official website

History
- Opened: 3 March 1980; 46 years ago

Passengers
- 2020: 1630 daily

Services
Preceding station	JR West	Following station
Kawachi-Katakami towards JR Namba	Yamatoji Line Local	Ōji towards Kamo
Location
- Location within Nara Prefecture Location within Japan

Sangō Station (三郷駅, Sangō-eki) is a passenger railway station located in the town of Sangō, Nara, Japan. It is operated by West Japan Railway Company (JR West) and is administrated by Ōji Station.

== Lines ==
The station is served by the Kansai Main Line (Yamatoji Line) and is 30.2 kilometers from the starting point of the line at Kamo and 151.1 kilometers from Nagoya.

== Layout ==
Sangō Station is an above-ground station with two side platforms and two tracks. The effective length of the platform is for eight cars. The platform on the station building side is for Ōji-bound trains, and the platform on the opposite side across the pedestrian overpass is for Tennoji-bound trains.

=== Platforms ===
1	■ Yamatoji Line	for Nara and Kamo
2	■ Yamatoji Line	for Oji, Tennoji, JR Namba and Osaka

== History ==
Sangō station opened on 3 March 1980. With the privatization of the Japan National Railways (JNR) on April 1, 1987, the station came under the control of West Japan Railway Company (JR West).

Station numbering was introduced in March 2018 with Sangō being assigned station number JR-Q30.

== Passenger statistics ==
The average daily passenger traffic in fiscal 2020 was 1630 passengers.

== Surrounding area ==
- Tatsuta Taisha

== See also ==
- List of railway stations in Japan
