= Seki Station =

Seki Station (関駅) is the name of two train stations in Japan:

- Seki Station on the Etsumi-Nan Line in Gifu Prefecture
- Seki Station (Mie)
