= Kasado Station =

Railway station in Suzuka, Mie Prefecture, Japan

CJ15 Kasado Station 加佐登駅
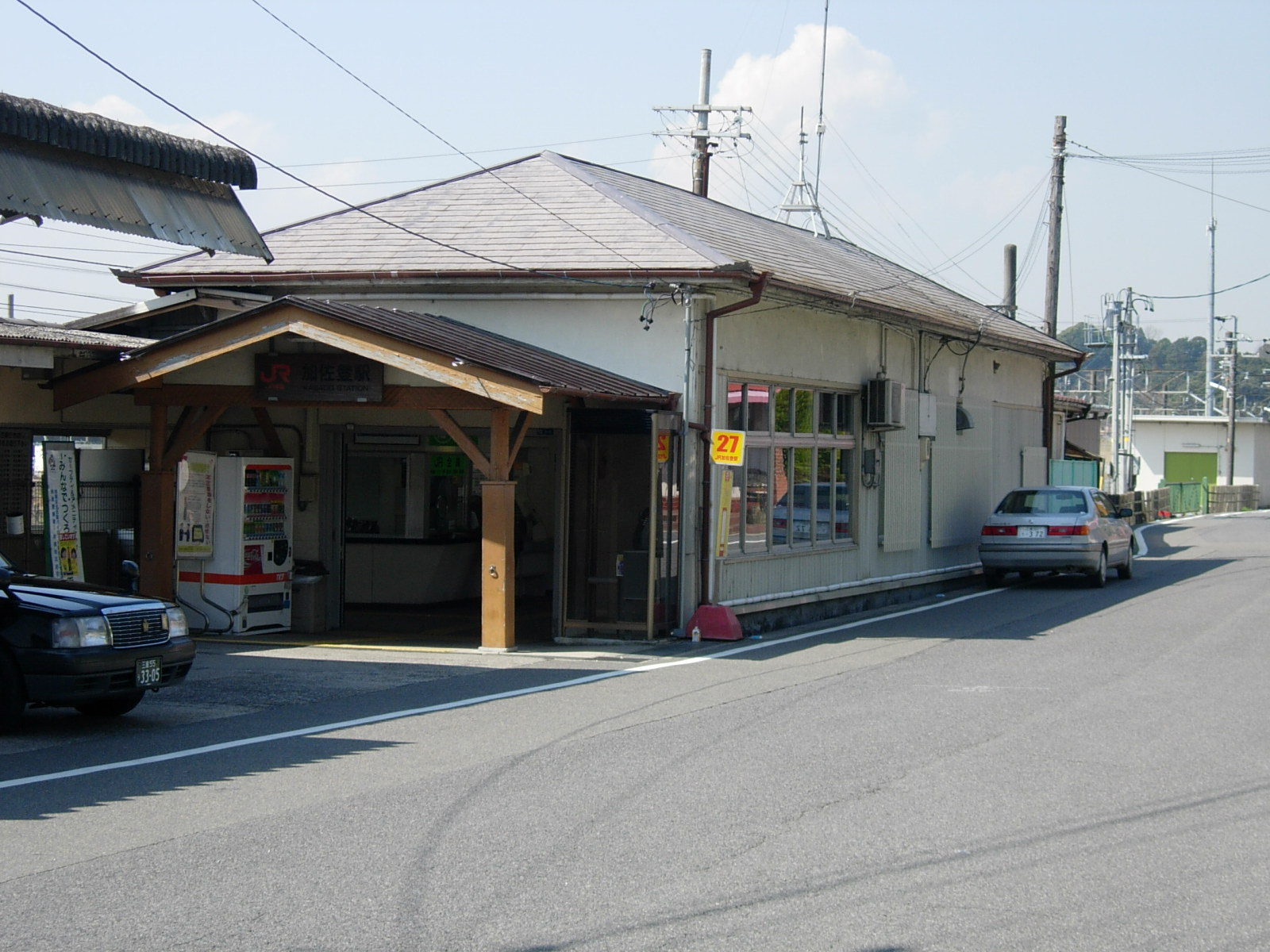
- Kasado Station in 2012

General information
- Location: 1-1-1 Kasado, Suzuka-shi, Mie-ken 513-0004; Japan
- Coordinates: 34°53′25.84″N 136°31′49.06″E
- Operator: JR Tōkai
- Line: Kansai Main Line
- Distance: 50.9 km from Nagoya
- Platforms: 2 side platforms
- Connections: Bus terminal

History
- Opened: February 6, 1892
- Former names: Takamiya (until 1902)

Passengers
- FY2019: 631 daily
Location
- Location within Mie Prefecture Location within Japan

Kasado Station (加佐登駅, Kasado-eki) is a passenger railway station in located in the city of Suzuka, Mie Prefecture, Japan, operated by Central Japan Railway Company (JR Tōkai).

== Lines ==
Kasado Station is served by the Kansai Main Line, and is 50.9 rail kilometers from the terminus of the line at Nagoya Station.

== Station layout ==
The station consists of one island platform and one side platform, connected by a footbridge.

=== Platforms ===
| 1, 2 | ■ Kansai Main Line | for Yokkaichi, Kuwana and Nagoya |
| 3 | ■ Kansai Main Line | for Kameyama |

== Adjacent stations ==
| « | Service | » |
Kansai Main Line
| Kawano | Rapid | Idagawa |
| Kawano | Semi Rapid | Idagawa |
| Kawano | Local | Idagawa |

== History ==
Kasado Station was opened on February 6, 1892, as Takamiya Station (高宮駅) on the Kansai Railway, when the section of the Kansai Main Line connecting Yokkaichi with Suzuka was completed. It was renamed Kasado Station on February 1, 1902. The Kansai Railway was nationalized on October 1, 1907, becoming part of the Japanese Government Railways (JGR). The JGR became the Japanese National Railways (JNR) after World War II. The station was absorbed into the JR Central network upon the privatization of the JNR on April 1, 1987. The station has been unattended since October 1, 2012.

Station numbering was introduced to the section of the Kansai Main Line operated JR Central in March 2018; Kasado Station was assigned station number CI15.

== Passenger statistics ==
In fiscal 2019, the station was used by an average of 631 passengers daily (boarding passengers only).

== Surrounding area ==
- Japan National Route 1
- Suzuka River
- Shōno-juku

== See also ==
- List of railway stations in Japan
