= Hōryūji Station =

Railway station in Ikaruga, Nara Prefecture, Japan

Hōryūji Station 法隆寺駅
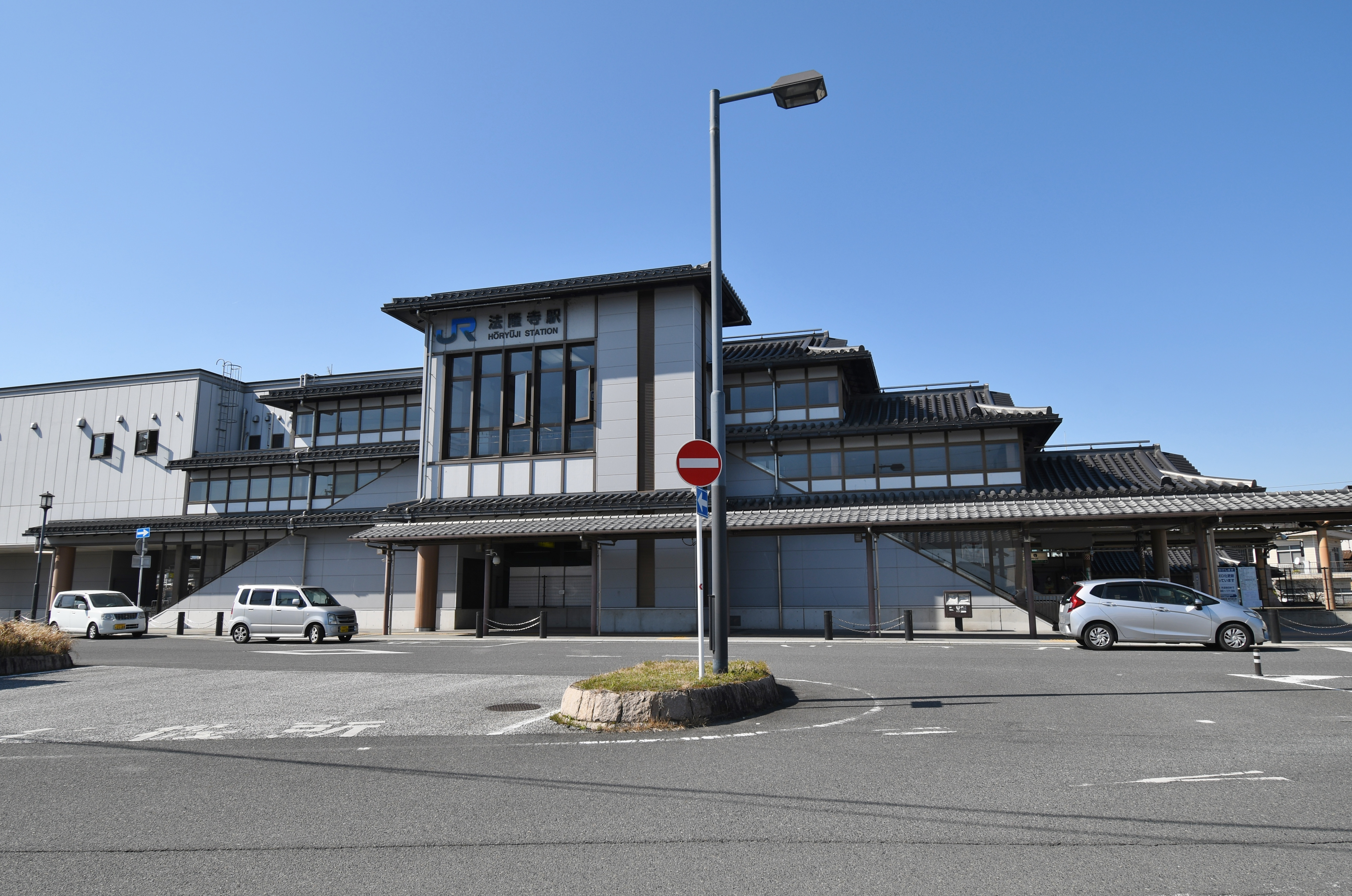
- Hōryūji Station, 2024

General information
- Location: 9-chōme-1 Okidome, Ikaruga-cho, Ikoma-gun, Nara-ken 636-0123; Japan
- Coordinates: 34°36′5.85″N 135°44′21.14″E
- System: 2
- Operator: JR West
- Line: Q Yamatoji Line
- Distance: 24.8 km from Kamo
- Platforms: 2 side platforms
- Connections: Bus terminal

Construction
- Structure type: Elevated

Other information
- Station code: JR-Q32
- Website: Official website

History
- Opened: 27 December 1890; 135 years ago

Passengers
- FY2020: 5558

Services
Preceding station	JR West	Following station
Ōji towards JR Namba	Yamatoji Line Rapid Local	Yamato-Koizumi towards Kamo
Location
- Location within Nara Prefecture Location within Japan

Hōryūji Station (法隆寺駅, Hōryūji-eki) is a passenger railway station located in the town of Ikaruga, Ikoma District, Nara Prefecture,. It is operated by West Japan Railway Company (JR West).

== Lines ==
The station is served by the Kansai Main Line (Yamatoji Line) and is 24.8 kilometers from the starting point of the line at Kamo and 145.7 kilometers from Nagoya.

== Layout ==
Hōryūji Station is an above-ground station with two opposed side platforms and two tracks, connected by an elevated station building. The station is staffed.

=== Platforms ===
1	■ Yamatoji Line	for Oji, Tennoji, JR Namba and Osaka
2	■ Yamatoji Line	for Nara and Kamo

== History ==
Hōryūji station opened on 27 December 1890 on the Osaka Railway. In 1900, the Kansai Railway took over operations of the Osaka Railway, and was subsequently nationalized in 1907. With the privatization of the Japan National Railways (JNR) on April 1, 1987, the station came under the control of West Japan Railway Company (JR West). The current station building was completed in 2007.

Station numbering was introduced in March 2018 with Hōryūji being assigned station number JR-Q33.

== Passenger statistics ==
The average daily passenger traffic in fiscal 2020 was 5558 passengers.

== Surrounding area ==
- Hōryū-ji
- Ikaruga Town Hall
- Tomio River
- Yamato River

== See also ==
- List of railway stations in Japan
