= Kōriyama Station (Nara) =

Railway station in Yamatokōriyama, Nara Prefecture, Japan

Kōriyama Station 郡山駅
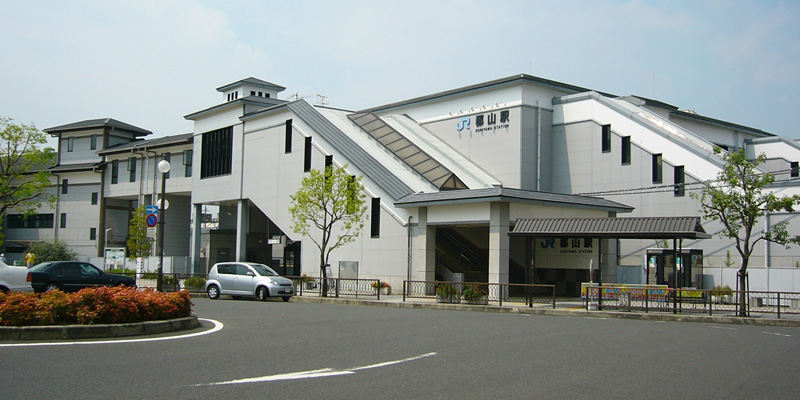
- Kōriyama Station

General information
- Location: 104-1, Takadaguchi-chō, Yamatokōriyama-shi, Nara-ken 639-1133
- Coordinates: 34°38′53.09″N 135°47′25.41″E
- Operator: JR West
- Line: Q Yamatoji Line
- Platforms: 2 side platforms
- Tracks: 2
- Connections: Bus stop

Construction
- Structure type: Elevated station building

Other information
- Station code: JR-Q34
- Website: Official website

History
- Opened: 27 December 1890; 135 years ago

Passengers
- FY2020: 4220 daily

Services
| Preceding station | JR West | Following station |
|---|---|---|
| Nara towards JR Namba | Yamatoji Line Local Rapid | Yamato-Koizumi towards Kamo |
Location
- Location within Nara Prefecture Location within Kansai region Location within Japan

Kōriyama Station (郡山駅, Kōriyama eki) is a passenger railway station located in the city of Yamatokōriyama, Nara, Japan. It is operated by West Japan Railway Company (JR West) and is administrated by Ōji Station.

== Lines ==
The station is served by the Kansai Main Line (Yamatoji Line) and is 17.8 kilometers from the starting point of the line at Kamo and 138.7 kilometers from Nagoya.

== Layout ==
Kōriyama Station is an above-ground station with two side platforms, connected by an elevated station building, the exterior of which is modeled after Kōriyama Castle. The station has a Midori no Madoguchi staffed ticket office.

=== Layout ===
| 1 | ■ Yamatoji Line | for Nara and Kamo |
| 2 | ■ Yamatoji Line | for Oji, Tennoji, JR Namba and Osaka |

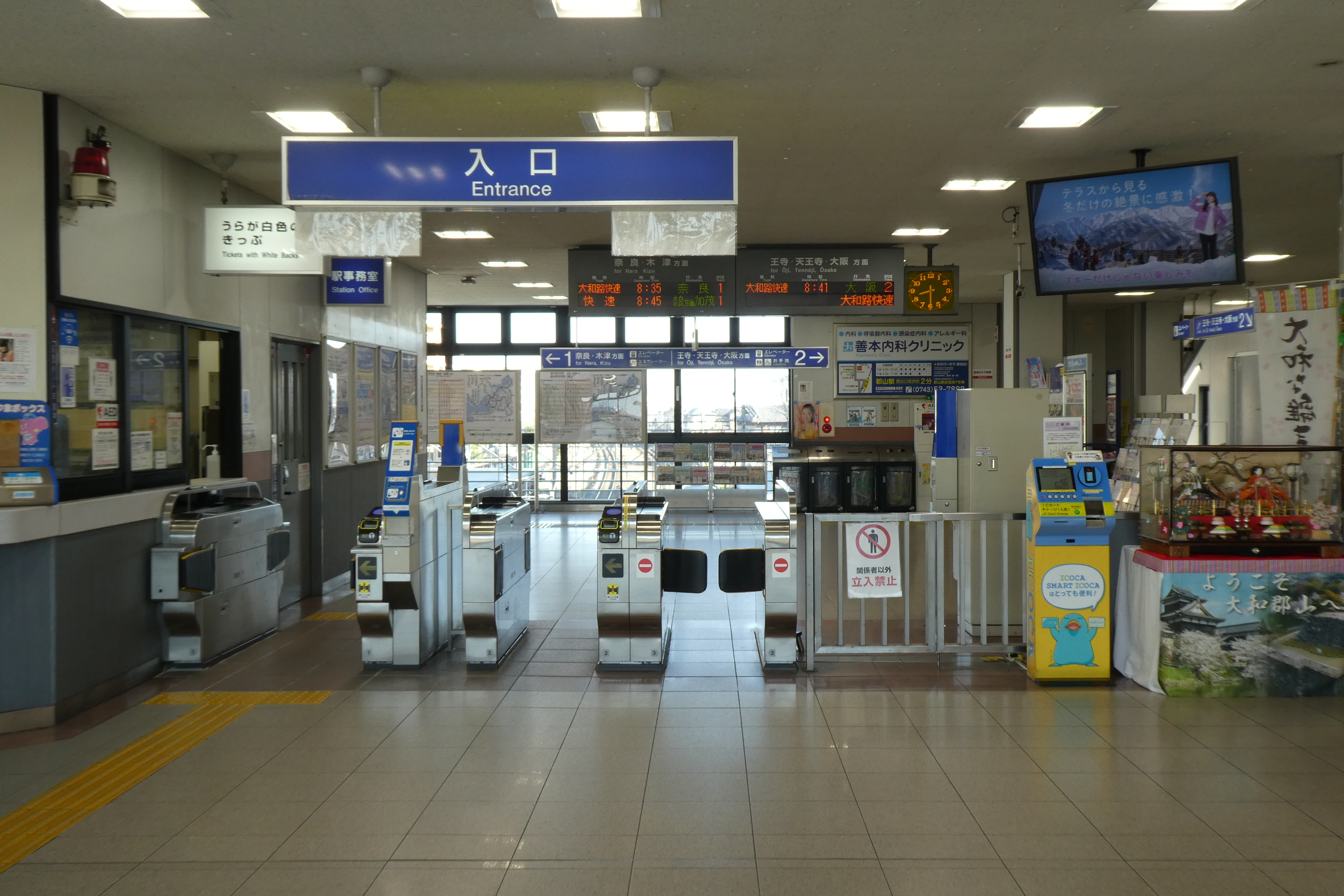
Ticket gate

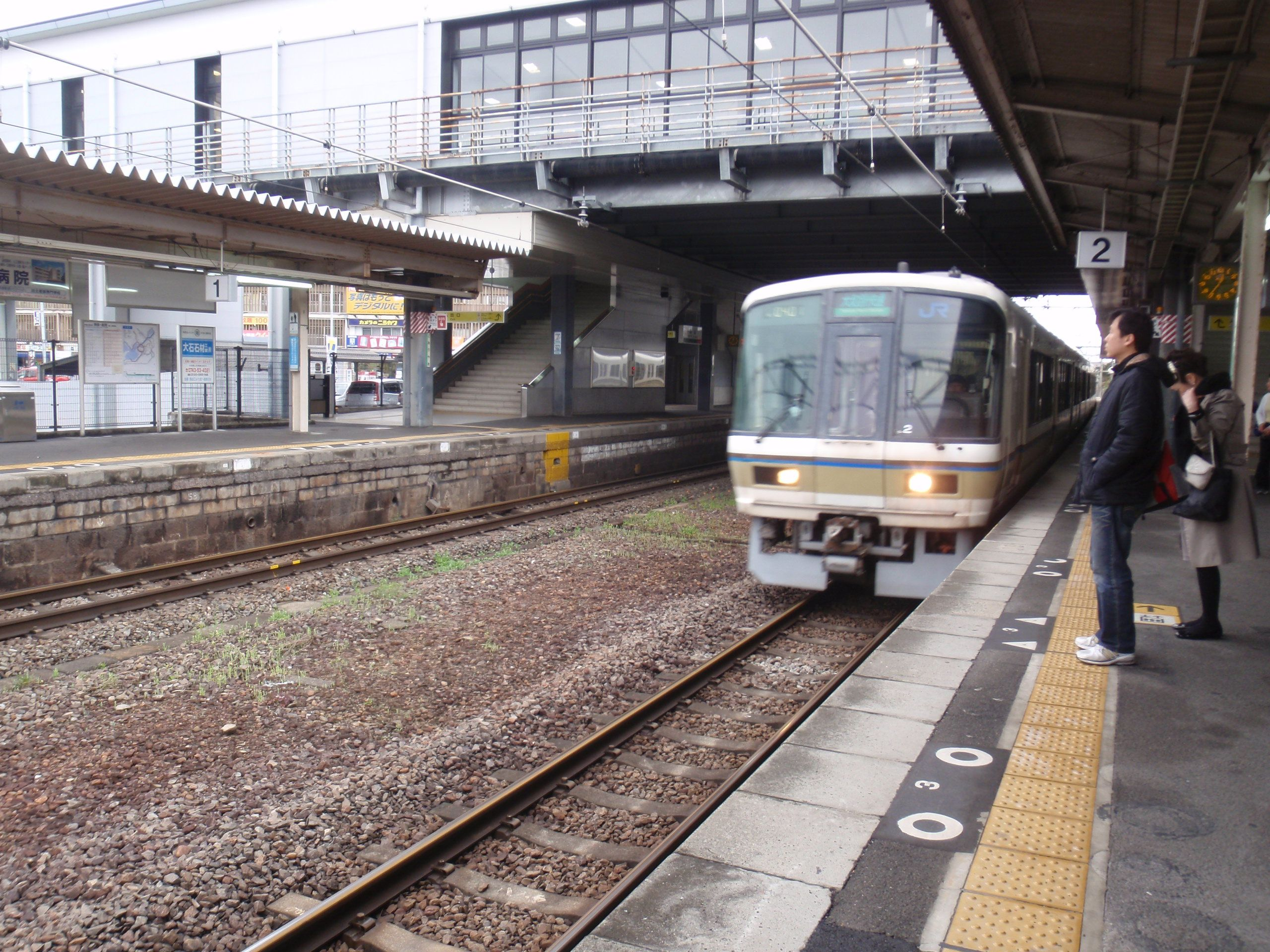
Platforms

== History ==
The station was opened on December 27, 1890 on the Osaka Railway between Nara and Ōji. The Osaka Railway was nationalized in 1907 and the line was renamed the Kansai Main Line in 1909. With the privatization of the Japan National Railways (JNR) on April 1, 1987, the station came under the control of West Japan Railway Company (JR West). Station numbering was introduced in March 2018 with Kōriyama being assigned station number JR-Q34.

== Passenger statistics ==
The average daily passenger traffic in fiscal 2020 was 4220 passengers.

== Surrounding area ==
The surrounding area is dominated by many apartment buildings and public housing. The traditional exit to the city center is on the west side of the station, but the east side has been redeveloped and a shopping mall is now open.

- Yamatokoriyama City Koriyama Minami Elementary School

== See also ==
- List of railway stations in Japan
