= Ōkawara =

Ōkawara, Okawara or Ookawara (written: 大河原) is a Japanese surname. Notable people with the surname include:

- Kunio Okawara (大河原 邦男, born 1947), Japanese mechanical designer in the anime industry
- Masako Okawara (大河原 雅子, born 1953), Japanese politician
- Takao Okawara (大河原 孝夫, born 1949), Japanese film director, writer and producer

== See also ==
- Ōkawara Station, a railway station in Minamiyamashiro, Soraku District, Kyoto Prefecture, Japan
