= Seki Station (Mie) =

Railway station in Kameyama, Mie Prefecture, Japan

Seki Station 関駅
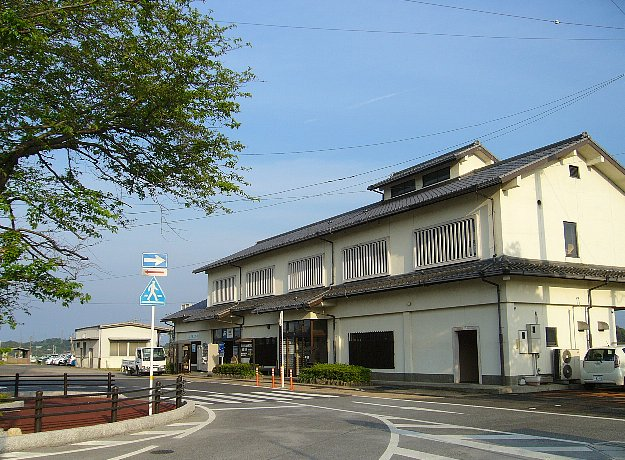
- Seki Station

General information
- Location: 664, Shinjo, Sekichō, Kameyama-shi, Mie-ken 519-1111; Japan
- Coordinates: 34°50′57″N 136°23′40″E
- System: JR-West regional rail station
- Owner: West Japan Railway Company (JR-West)
- Operator: Kameyama City Tourism Association
- Lines: Passenger train services: V Kansai Main Line; Railway track: Kansai Main Line
- Distance: 5.7 km (3.5 miles) from Kameyama
- Platforms: 2 side platforms
- Tracks: 2
- Train operators: JR-West
- Bus stands: 1
- Connections: Kameyama City Community Bus: Western A Route at Seki-eki-mae

Construction
- Structure type: At grade
- Cycle facilities: Available
- Accessible: None

Other information
- Website: Official website

History
- Opened: 25 December 1890

Passengers
- 2019: 434 daily
Services
Preceding station	JRW	Following station
Kabuto toward Kamo	Kansai Line	Kameyama; Terminus
Location
- Location within Mie Prefecture Location within Japan

Seki Station (関駅, Seki-eki) is a passenger railway station of West Japan Railway Company (JR-West) located in the city of Kameyama, Mie Prefecture, Japan.

== Lines ==
Seki Station is served by the Kansai Main Line and is located 65.6 rail kilometres from the terminus of the line at Nagoya Station and 5.7 rail kilometers from Kameyama Station.

== Layout ==
The station consists of two side platforms serving two tracks, connected by a footbridge.

=== Platforms ===
Westbound	■ Kansai Line	for Iga-Ueno and Kamo
Eastbound	■ Kansai Line	for Kameyama

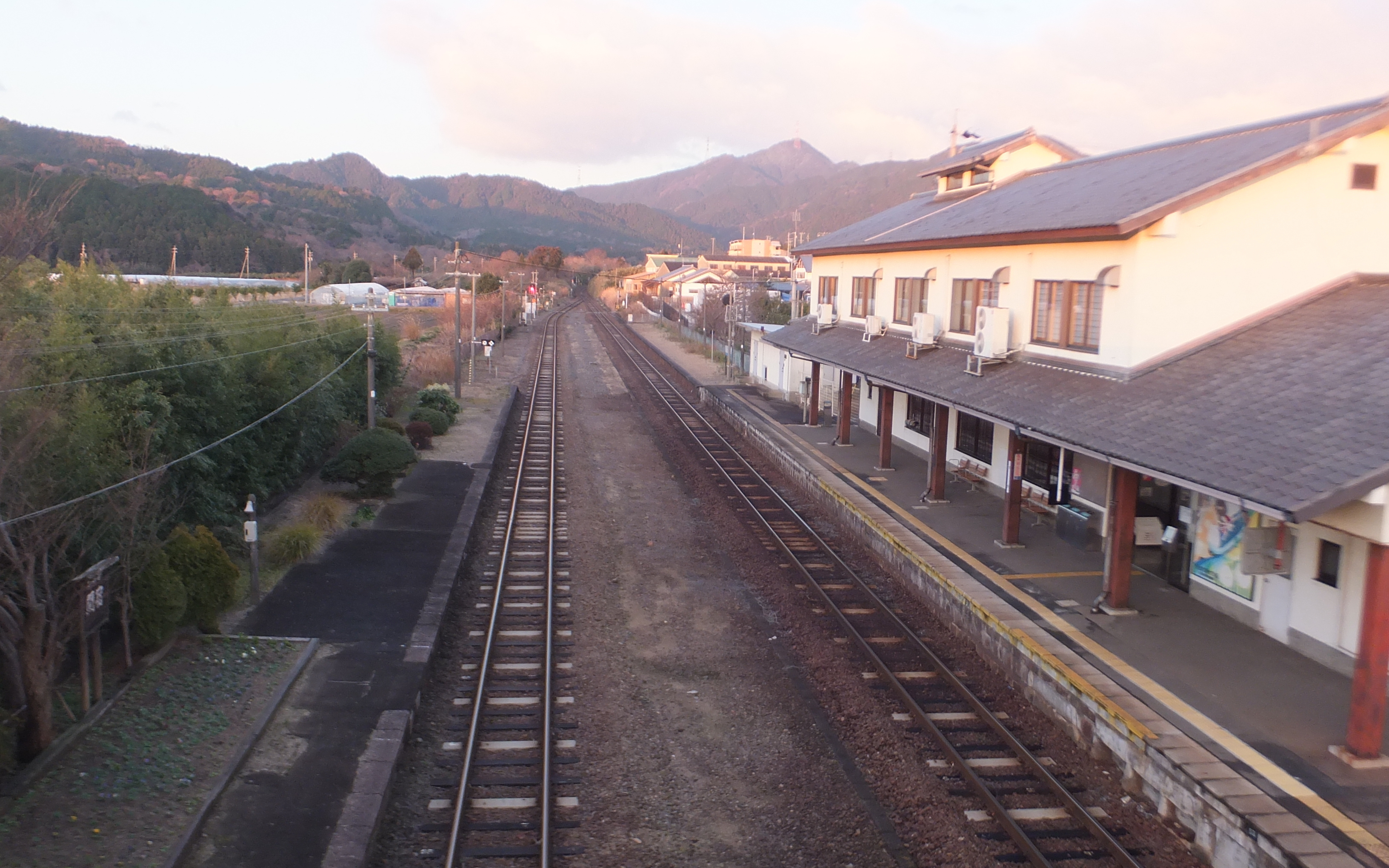
The platforms in January 2015

== History ==
Seki Station was opened on December 25, 1890 with the extension of the Kansai Railway from Yokkaichi Station to Tsuge Station. The Kansai Railway was nationalized on October 1, 1907, becoming part of the Imperial Government Railways (IGR), which became Japan National Railways (JNR) after World War II. Freight operations were discontinued from April 1, 1972. With the privatization of JNR on April 1, 1987, the station came under the control of JR-West.

== Passenger statistics ==
In fiscal 2019, the station was used by an average of 434 passengers daily (boarding passengers only).

== Surrounding area ==
- Seki-juku (Tōkaidō)
- former Seki Town Hall

== See also ==
- List of railway stations in Japan
