= Minamiyamashiro =

Minamiyamashiro 南山城村
- Village
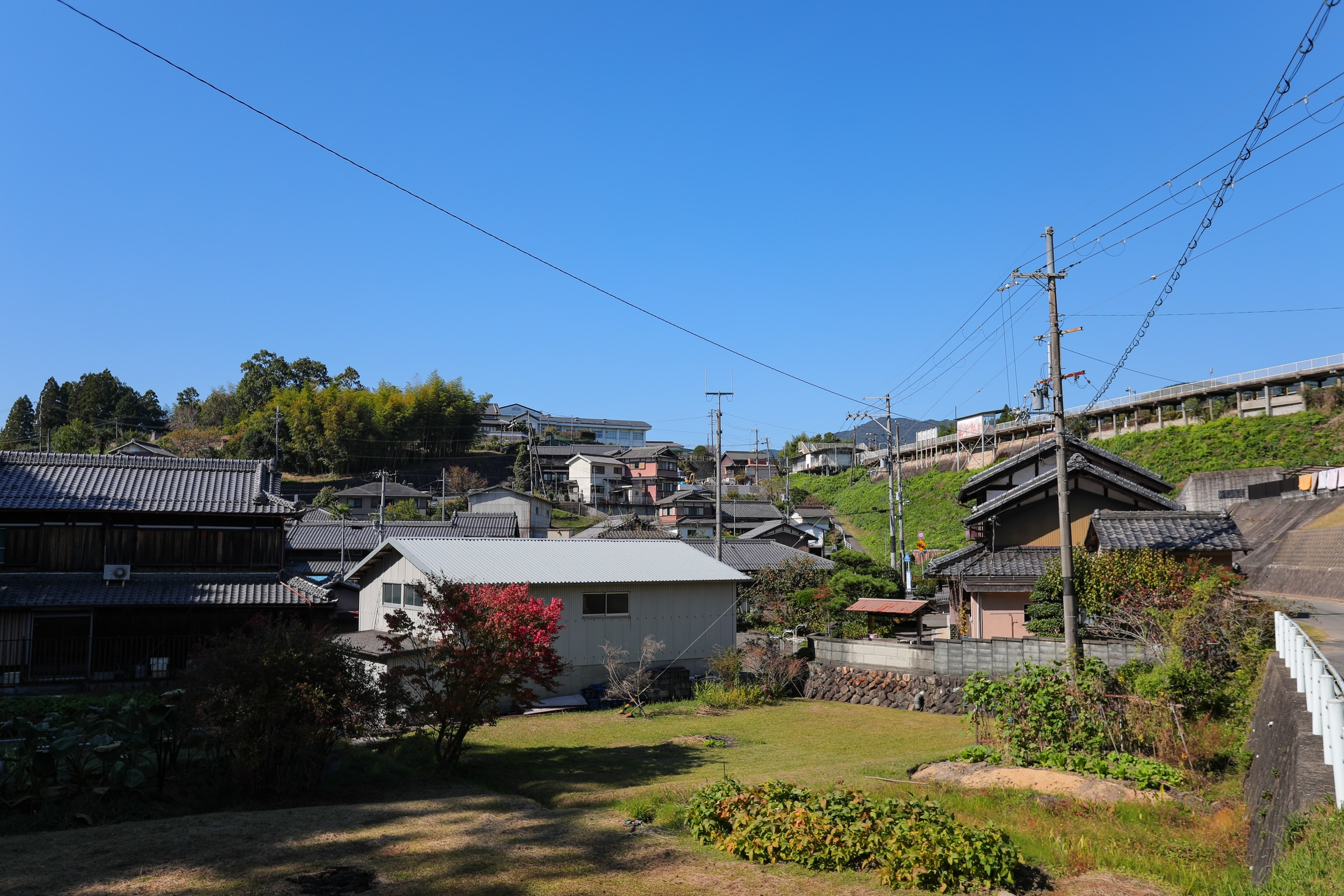
- Minamiyamashiro Village

- Flag Emblem
- Interactive map of Minamiyamashiro
- Location in Japan
- Coordinates: 34°46′22″N 135°59′37″E
- Country: Japan
- Region: Kansai
- Prefecture: Kyoto
- District: Sōraku

Area
  - Total: 64.11 km^{2} (24.75 sq mi)

Population (July 31, 2023)
  - Total: 2,472
  - Density: 38.56/km^{2} (99.87/sq mi)
- Time zone: UTC+09:00 (JST)
- City hall address: 14-1 Kubo, Kita-Ogawara, Minamiyamashiro-mura, Soraku-gun, Kyoto-fu 619-1411
- Website: Official website
- Symbols
- Flower: Prunus cerasus
- Tree: Rhododendron

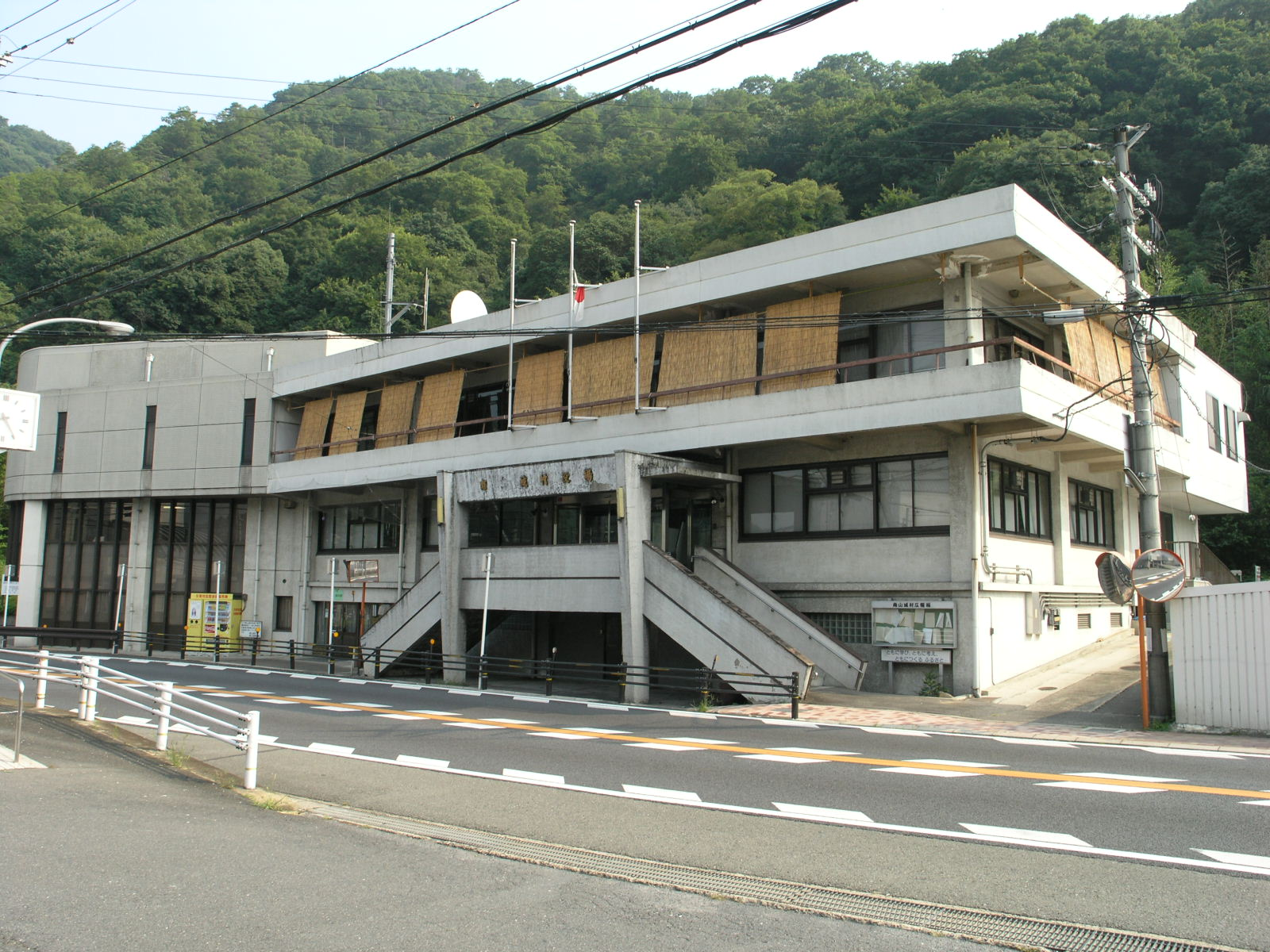
Minamiyamashiro Village Hall

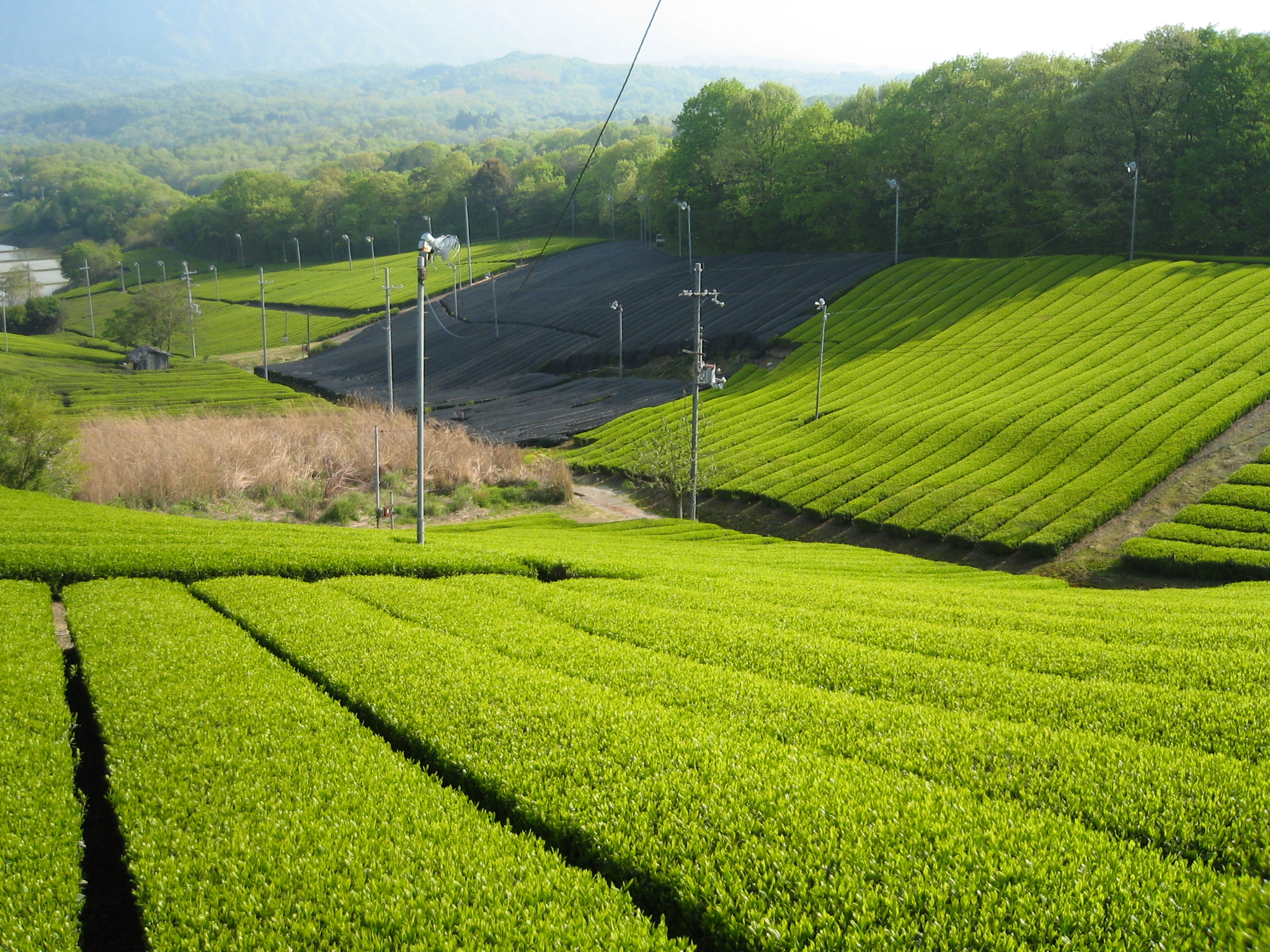
Tea plantations in Minamiyamashiro Village

Minamiyamashiro (南山城村, Minamiyamashiro-mura) is a village located in Sōraku District, Kyoto Prefecture, Japan. As of 1 July 2023 the village has an estimated population of 2,472 in 1219 households and a population density of 39 persons per km^{2}. The total area of the village is 64.11 square kilometres (24.75 sq mi).

== Geography ==
Minamiyamashiro is located in the far southeastern corner of Kyoto Prefecture. The Kizu River flows through the village.

=== Neighboring municipalities ===
Kyoto Prefecture

- Sōraku District (Kasagi・Wazuka)

Mie Prefecture

- Iga

Nara Prefecture

- Nara

Shiga Prefecture

- Kōka

=== Climate ===
Minamiyamashiro has a humid subtropical climate (Köppen Cfa) characterized by warm summers and cool winters with light to no snowfall. The average annual temperature in Minamiyamashiro is 13.5 °C. The average annual rainfall is 1439 mm with September as the wettest month. The temperatures are highest on average in August, at around 25.5 °C, and lowest in January, at around 1.9 °C.

== Demographics ==
Per Japanese census data, the population of Minamiyamashiro has declined in recent decades.

Historical population
Year	Pop.	±%
1940	3,599	—
1950	4,428	+23.0%
1960	4,050	−8.5%
1970	3,570	−11.9%
1980	3,396	−4.9%
1990	3,890	+14.5%
2000	3,784	−2.7%
2010	3,078	−18.7%
2020	2,391	−22.3%

== History ==
The area of Minamiyamashiro was part of ancient Yamashiro Province. During the Edo Period, the area was art of the holdings of Yagyū Domain. It was the starting point for water transportation along the Kizugawa River, and was a shipping point for Shigaraki ware and lumber, The villages of Takayama and Ōkawara were established on April 1, 1889 with the creation of the modern municipalities system. The two villages merged on April 1, 1955 to form the village of Minamiyamashiro.

== Government ==
Minamiyamashiro has a mayor-council form of government with a directly elected mayor and a unicameral village council of ten members. Minamiyamashiro, collectively with the other municipalities of Sōraku District and the city of Kizugawa, contributes two members to the Kyoto Prefectural Assembly. In terms of national politics, the village is part of the Kyoto 6th district of the lower house of the Diet of Japan.

== Economy ==
Minamiyamashiro is a rural area, with an economy based on agriculture, with the area noted for its production of green tea.

== Education ==
Minamiyamashiro has one public elementary school and one public junior high school operated by the Sōraku Tōbu kōiki rengō. The village does not have a high school

== Transportation ==
=== Railways ===
JR West - Kansai Main Line

- Tsukigaseguchi - Ōkawara

=== Highways ===
- National Route 163

== Local attractions ==
- Japanese Heritage Site No.1 “800 Years of Japanese Tea History Walk” - On April 24, 2015, Dosenbo, Takao, Tayama, and Imayama tea plantations were selected as cultural property elements
