= Idagawa Station =

Railway station in Kameyama, Mie Prefecture, Japan

CJ16 Idagawa Station 井田川駅
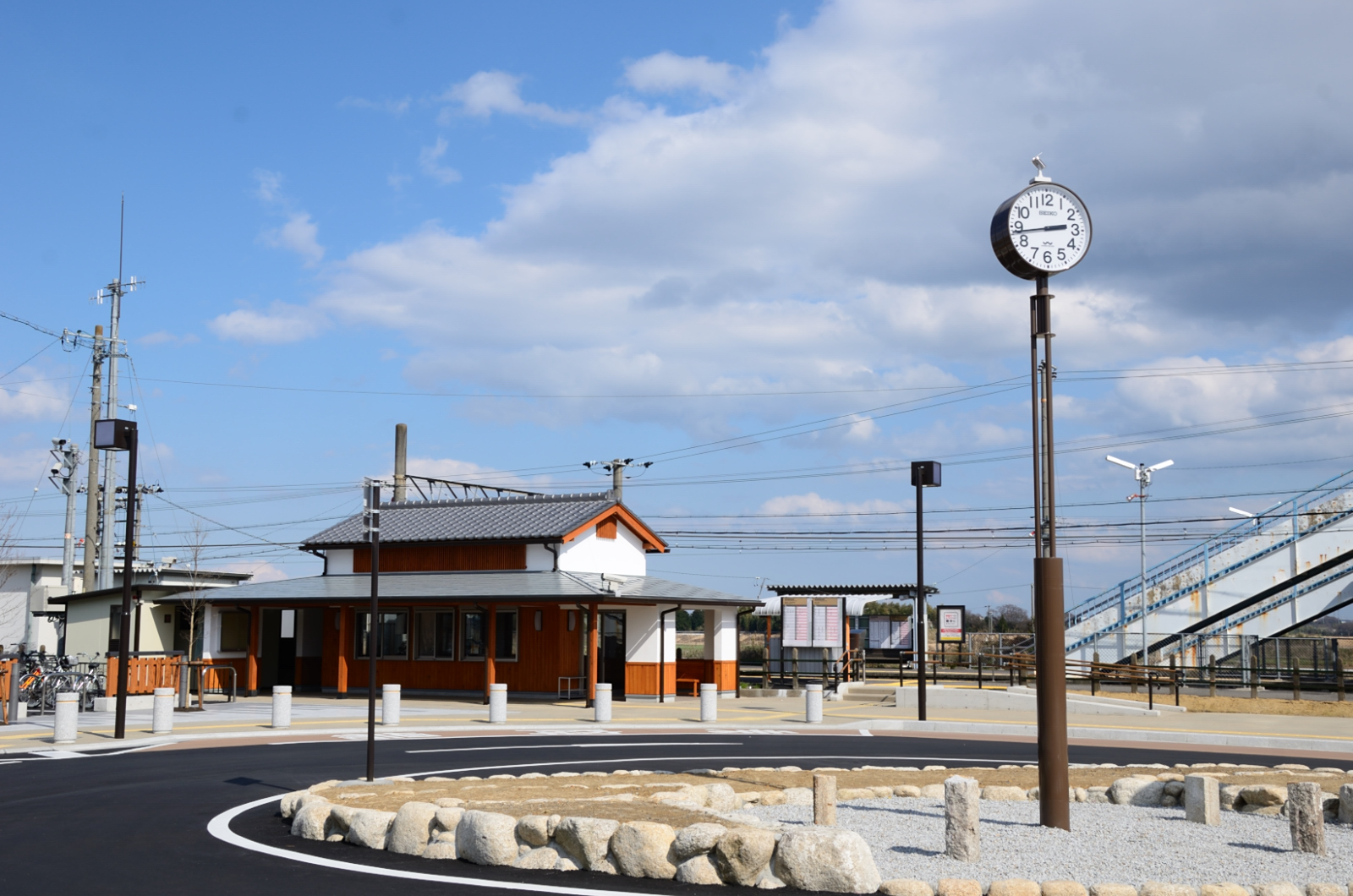
- JR Idagawa Station in 2012

General information
- Location: Idagawa-chō 364, Kameyama-shi, Mie-ken 519-0101; Japan
- Coordinates: 34°52′6.6″N 136°29′33.42″E
- Operator: JR Tōkai
- Line: Kansai Main Line
- Distance: 55.3 km from Nagoya
- Platforms: 2 side platforms
- Connections: Bus terminal

History
- Opened: May 20, 1929

Passengers
- FY2019: 688 daily
Location
- Location within Mie Prefecture Location within Japan

Idagawa Station (井田川駅, Idagawa-eki) is a passenger railway station in located in the city of Kameyama, Mie Prefecture, Japan, operated by Central Japan Railway Company (JR Tōkai).

== Lines ==
Idagawa Station is served by the Kansai Main Line, and is 55.3 rail kilometers from the terminus of the line at Nagoya Station.

== Station layout ==
The station consists of two opposed side platforms connected by a footbridge.

=== Platforms ===
1	■ Kansai Main Line	For Yokkaichi, Kuwana, Nagoya
2	■ Kansai Main Line	For Kameyama

== Adjacent stations ==
«	Service	»
Central Japan Railway Company (JR Central)
Kansai Main Line
Kasado	Local	Kameyama
Kasado	Semi Rapid	Kameyama
Kasado	Rapid	Kameyama

== Station history ==
Idagawa Station was opened on May 20, 1929 on the Japanese Government Railways, when the section of the Kansai Main Line connecting Suzuka with Kamayama was completed. The JGR became the Japan National Railways (JNR) after World War II. The station has been unattended since July 11, 1974. The station was absorbed into the JR Central network upon the privatization of the JNR on April 1, 1987. A new station building was completed in 2012.

Station numbering was introduced to the section of the Kansai Main Line operated JR Central in March 2018; Idagawa Station was assigned station number CI16.

== Passenger statistics ==
In fiscal 2019, the station was used by an average of 688 passengers daily (boarding passengers only).

== Surrounding area ==
- Japan National Route 1
- Suzuka River
- Nobonotsuka Kofun

Kameyama City Idagawa Elementary School

== See also ==
- List of railway stations in Japan
