= Kansai Main Line =

Railway line in Japan

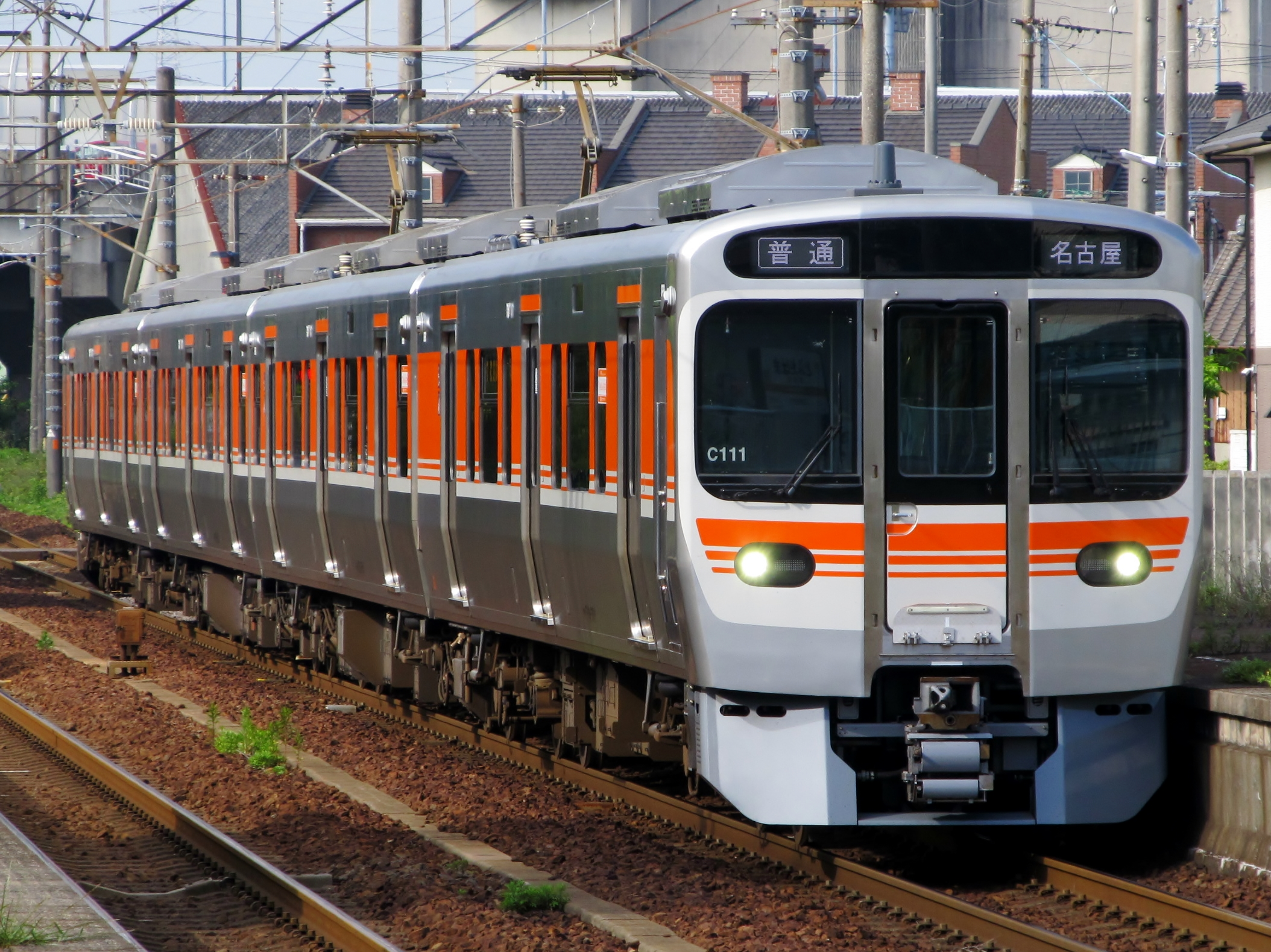
- 315 series EMU bound for Nagoya in May 2024

Overview
- Other name: Yamatoji Line (Kamo - JR Namba)
- Native name: 関西本線
- Status: In operation
- Owner: JR Central; JR West
- Locale: Aichi Prefecture; Mie Prefecture; Kyoto Prefecture; Nara Prefecture; Osaka Prefecture
- Termini: Nagoya; JR Namba
- Stations: 52

Service
- Type: Heavy rail
- Operator(s): JR Central; JR West; JR Freight

History
- Opened: 1889; 137 years ago

Technical
- Line length: 179.6 km (111.6 mi)
- Character: Both urban and rural
- Track gauge: 1,067 mm (3 ft 6 in)
- Electrification: 1,500 V DC, overhead line (Nagoya–Kameyama, Kamo–JR Namba)
- Operating speed: 120 km/h (75 mph) (Nagoya–Kawarada, Nara–Tennoji); 95 km/h (59 mph) (Kawarada–Nara, Tennoji–JR Namba)

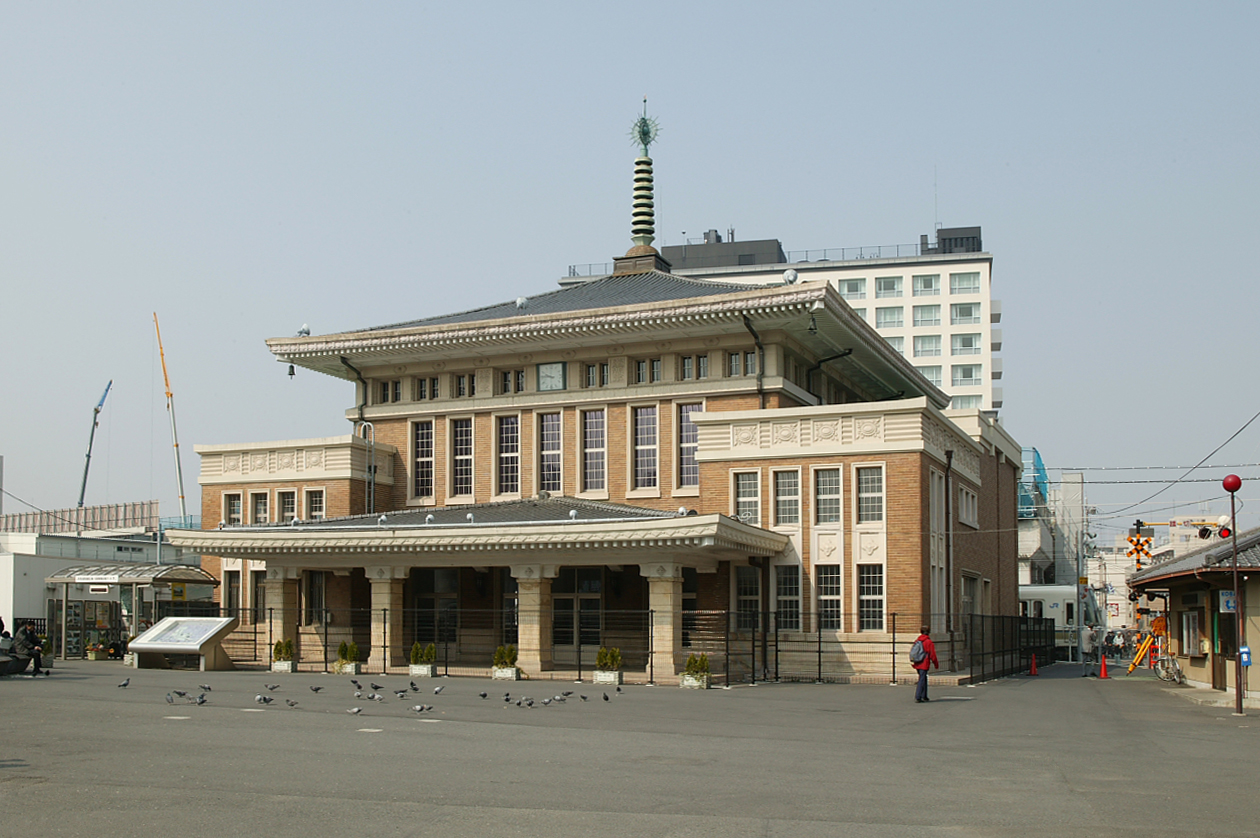
Old Nara Station building in March 2007

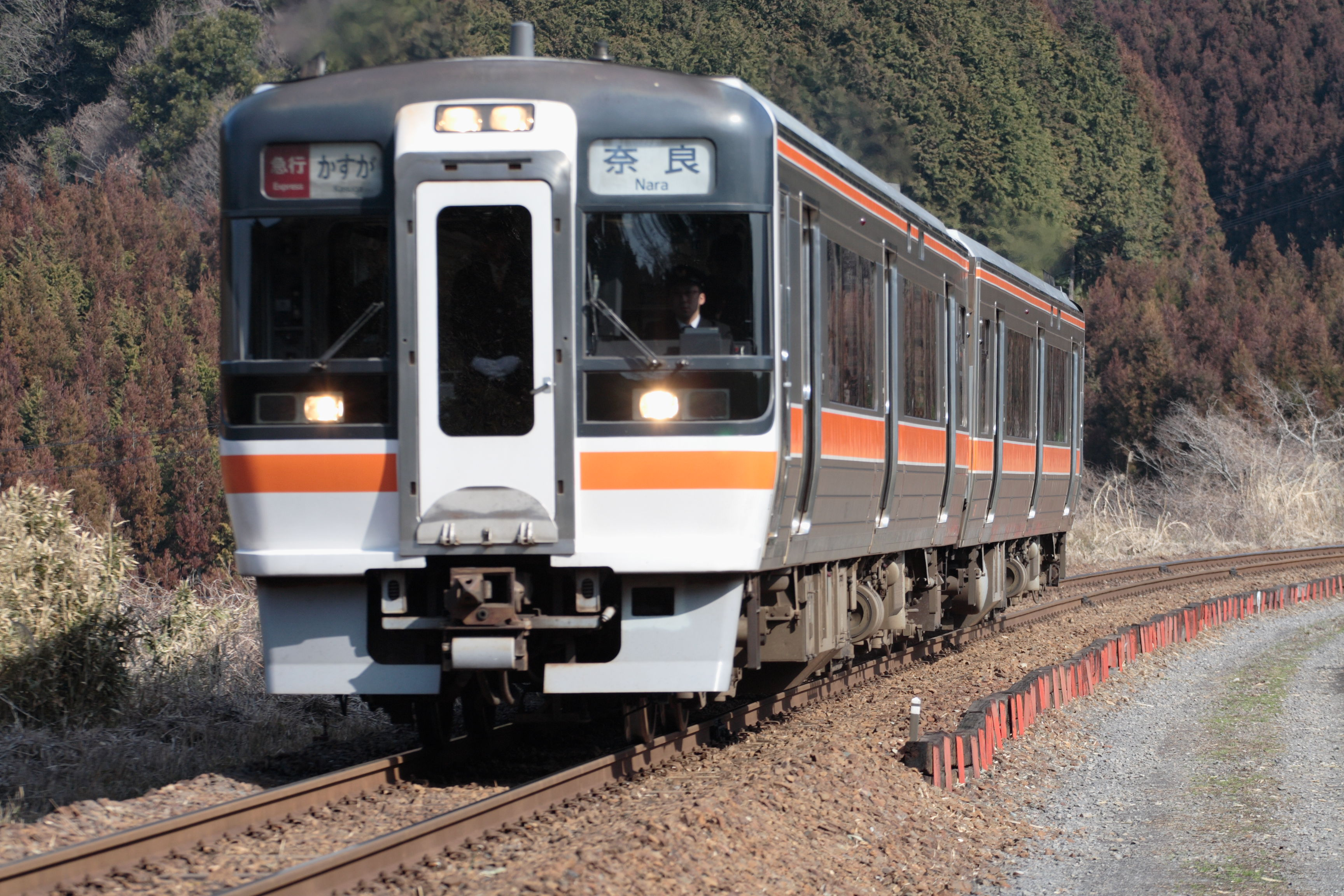
A Kasuga express train in a rural section. The photo was taken in March 2006, shortly before the service was discontinued.

The Kansai Main Line (関西本線, Kansai-honsen; also called the "Kansai Line") is a railway line in Japan, which connects Nagoya Station with JR Namba Station in Osaka. It is jointly run by the Central Japan Railway Company (JR Central) and West Japan Railway Company (JR West), with the boundary between both companies being located at Kameyama Station in Kameyama, Mie.

The section from Kamo Station west to JR Namba Station is electrified and a part of the JR West "Urban Network", and is nicknamed the Yamatoji Line. The JR Central section from Nagoya to Kameyama is also electrified.

Despite its name, for much of its length it is a very local line with mainly single track sections and no regular express services. The line was originally built in the 1890s by Kansai Railway (later under the Japanese Government Railways and Japanese National Railways) as an alternate route from south Osaka to Nara and Nagoya, but competition from the Kintetsu lines and declining ridership forced the line to operationally become two electric suburban lines for Osaka and Nagoya respectively, with a less-used unelectrified rural section in the middle.

Formerly a Kasuga express train ran from Nagoya to Nara, but this service was discontinued in March 2006.

== History ==
The Osaka Railway Co. opened the Minatomachi (now JR Namba) to Nara section between 1889 and 1892. The company merged with the Kansai Railway Co. in 1900.

The Nara Railway Co. opened the Nara to Kizu section in 1896. It merged with the Kansai Railway Co. in 1905.

The Kansai Railway Co. opened the Nagoya to Kizu section between 1890 and 1897, completing the line. The company was nationalised in 1907.

=== Duplication ===
The Minatomachi to Tennoji section was duplicated in 1903 and extended to Kashiwara in 1908. The Nara to Kizu section was duplicated in 1914, and the Kashiwara to Nara section between 1923 and 1926. In 1944 the Oji to Nara section was returned to single track and the materials recycled for the Japanese war effort. The section was re-duplicated in 1961.

The Tomita to Kuwana section (except for the bridge over the Inabe River) was duplicated in 1973, and the Kuwana to Yatomi section between 1977 and 1980. The Yokkaichi to Tomidahama section was duplicated in 1993.

=== Electrification ===
The Minatomachi to Nara section was electrified in 1973, extended to Kizu in 1984, and to Kamo in 1988.

The Nagoya - Hatta section was electrified in 1979, and extended to Kameyama in 1982.

=== Other matters of note ===
CTC signalling was commissioned between Kizu and Kameyama in 1983, and extended to Nagoya in 2001.

In 1994 Minatomachi Station was renamed JR Namba to coincide with the opening of the Kansai Airport Line to Kansai Airport. In 1996 Namba Station and the approach line were relocated underground to eliminate a number of level crossings. There are plans to extend the line from Namba to Osaka Station, with construction to begin within the next few years. (See Naniwasuji Line for information.)

=== Former connecting lines ===
- Kamo Station - In 1898 the Kansai Railway Co. opened an 8 km (5.0 mi) branch to a station beside the Daibutsu (Great Buddha), and in 1899 extended the line 2 km (1.2 mi) to Nara. Following the nationalisation of the Kansai Railway Co. in 1907, the 10 km (6.2 mi) line was closed.
- Horyuji Station - The 4 km (2.5 mi) 1,435 mm (4 ft 8 1/2 in) standard gauge Kintetsu line to Hirahata operated between 1915 and 1945.
- Kyuhoji Station - A branchline to serve the Taisho airfield opened in 1942, and was extended to Sugimotocho Station on the Hanwa Line in 1952 to provide an electrified (1500 V DC) freight bypass between Wakayama and Nagoya. Passenger services were introduced in 1965 but ceased two years later, and the line closed in 2009 after being out of service for five years.
- Tennoji Station - The 2.4 km (1.5 mi) Nankai line to Tengachaya, electrified at 1500 V DC, operated between 1901 and 1993.

== Stations ==
=== JR Central (Nagoya–Kameyama) ===
- S: Trains stop
- |: Trains pass
- Local trains stop at all stations.

No.	Station	Japanese	Semi Rapid	Rapid	Rapid Mie	Transfers	Location	
CJ00	Nagoya	名古屋	S	S	S	Tokaido Shinkansen, Tokaido Main Line, Chuo Main Line; Nagoya Subway Higashiyama Line (H08), Sakuradori Line (S02); Aonami Line (AN01); Meitetsu Nagoya Main Line (Meitetsu Nagoya Station); Kintetsu Nagoya Line (Kintetsu Nagoya Station)	Nakamura-ku, Nagoya	Aichi Prefecture
CJ01	Hatta	八田	|	|	|	Nagoya Subway Higashiyama Line (H02); Kintetsu Nagoya Line (Kintetsu Hatta Station)	Nakamura-ku, Nagoya	Aichi Prefecture
CJ02	Haruta	春田	|	|	|		Nakagawa-ku, Nagoya	Aichi Prefecture
CJ03	Kanie	蟹江	S	|	|		Kanie, Ama District	Aichi Prefecture
CJ04	Eiwa	永和	|	|	|		Aisai	Aichi Prefecture
CJ05	Yatomi	弥富	S	|	|	Meitetsu Bisai Line; Kintetsu Nagoya Line (Kintetsu Yatomi Station)	Yatomi	Aichi Prefecture
CJ06	Nagashima	長島	|	|	|	Kintetsu Nagoya Line (Kintetsu Nagashima Station)	Kuwana	Mie Prefecture
CJ07	Kuwana	桑名	S	S	S	Kintetsu Nagoya Line; Yōrō Railway Yōrō Line; Sangi Railway Hokusei Line (Nishi-Kuwana Station)	Kuwana	Mie Prefecture
CJ08	Asahi	朝日	S	|	|		Asahi, Mie District	Mie Prefecture
CJ09	Tomida	富田	S	|	|	Sangi Railway Sangi Line (Kintetsu Tomida Station); Kintetsu Nagoya Line (Kintetsu Tomida Station)	Yokkaichi	Mie Prefecture
CJ10	Tomidahama	富田浜	S	|	|		Yokkaichi	Mie Prefecture
CJ11	Yokkaichi	四日市	S	S	S	JR Freight Kansai Main Line (for Shiohama); Kintetsu Nagoya Line (Kintetsu Yokkaichi Station) connected by bus	Yokkaichi	Mie Prefecture
CJ12	Minami-Yokkaichi	南四日市	S	S	|		Yokkaichi	Mie Prefecture
CJ13	Kawarada	河原田	S	S	|	Ise Railway Ise Line	Yokkaichi	Mie Prefecture
CJ14	Kawano	河曲	S	S	Ise Railway Ise Line		Suzuka	Mie Prefecture
CJ15	Kasado	加佐登	S	S	Ise Railway Ise Line		Suzuka	Mie Prefecture
CJ16	Idagawa	井田川	S	S	Ise Railway Ise Line		Kameyama	Mie Prefecture
CJ17	Kameyama	亀山	S	S	Ise Railway Ise Line	Kisei Main Line; JR West Kansai Main Line (for Kamo and Nara)	Kameyama	Mie Prefecture

=== JR West (Kameyama–Kamo) ===
All stations between Kameyama and Kamo featured passing double tracks.

Station	Japanese	Transfers	Location	
Kameyama	亀山	JR Central: Kansai Main Line (for Nagoya); Kisei Main Line	Kameyama	Mie Prefecture
Seki	関		Kameyama	Mie Prefecture
Kabuto	加太		Kameyama	Mie Prefecture
Tsuge	柘植	Kusatsu Line	Iga	Mie Prefecture
Shindō	新堂		Iga	Mie Prefecture
Sanagu	佐那具		Iga	Mie Prefecture
Iga-Ueno	伊賀上野	Iga Railway Iga Line (Ninja Line)	Iga	Mie Prefecture
Shimagahara	島ヶ原		Iga	Mie Prefecture
Tsukigaseguchi	月ケ瀬口		Minamiyamashiro, Soraku District	Kyoto Prefecture
Ōkawara	大河原		Minamiyamashiro, Soraku District	Kyoto Prefecture
Kasagi	笠置		Kasagi, Soraku District	Kyoto Prefecture
Kamo	加茂	( Q39 Yamatoji Line)	Kizugawa	Kyoto Prefecture

=== JR West (Kamo–JR Namba) ===
See the Yamatoji Line article for the train types and stopping patterns on this section.
Stations on this section

- Kamo - Kizu - Narayama - Nara - Kōriyama - Yamato-Koizumi - Hōryūji - Ōji - Sangō - Kawachi-Katakami - Takaida - Kashiwara - Shiki - Yao - Kyūhōji - Kami - Hirano - Tōbu-shijō-mae - Tennōji - Shin-Imamiya - Imamiya - JR Namba

== Rolling stock ==
=== JR Central ===
==== EMU ====
- 211 series
- 313 series
- 315 series (since 1 June 2023)

==== DMU ====
- KiHa 75 series
- HC85 series
- Ise Railway Ise type III

=== JR West ===
==== DMU ====
- KiHa 120 series

=== Former ===
- 101 series
- 113 series
- 165 series
- 213-5000 series
- 201 series
- KiHa 17
- KiHa 35
- KiHa 50
- KiHa 51
- KiHa 55
- KiHa 58
- KiHa 65
- KiHa 81
- KiHa 82
- Ise Railway Ise I
- Ise Railway Ise II
- KiHa 85
