= Iga-Ueno Station =

Railway station in Iga, Mie Prefecture, Japan

Iga-Ueno Station 伊賀上野駅
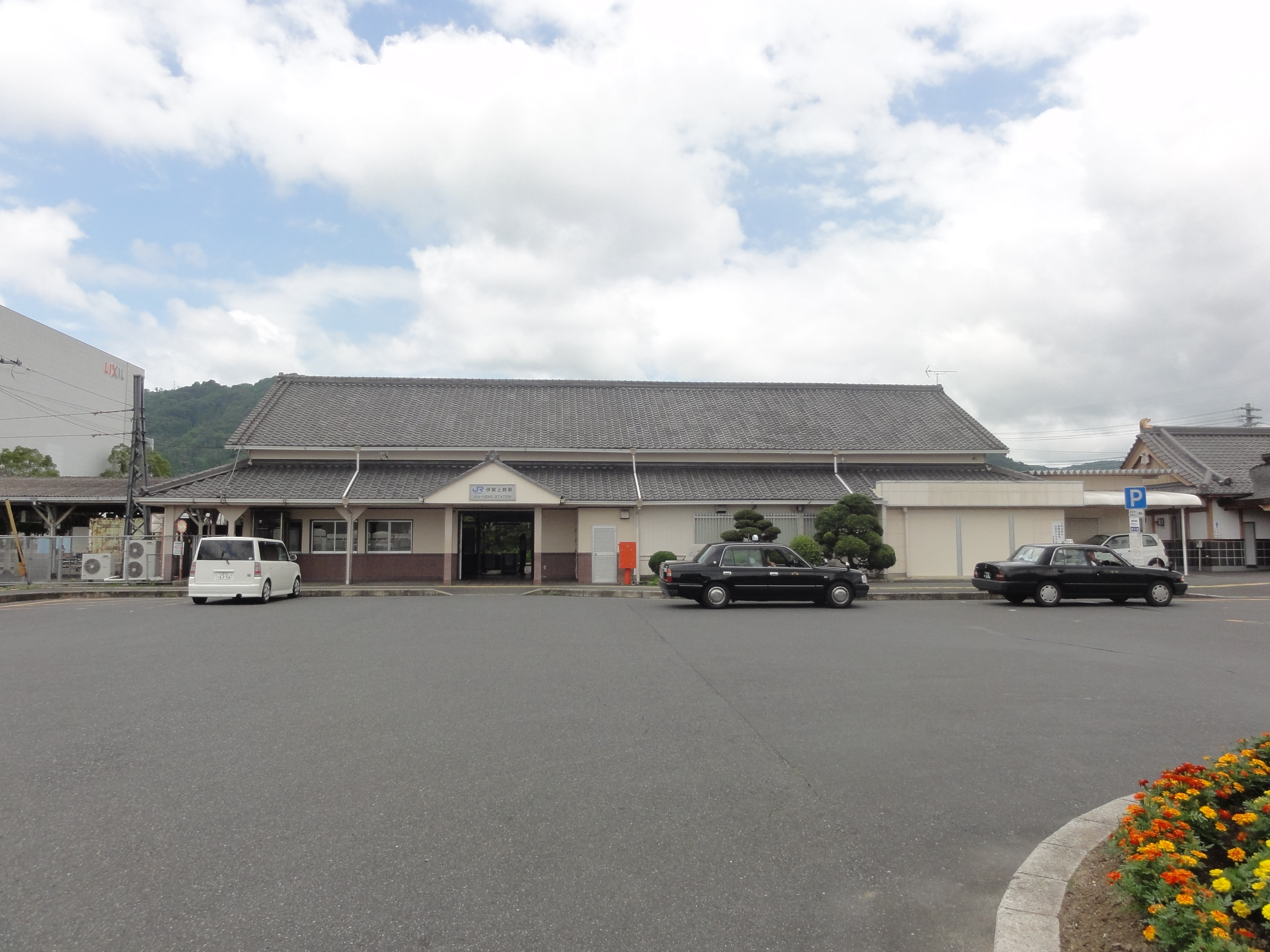
- Iga-Ueno Station in July 2012

General information
- Location: Mita, Iga-shi, Mie-ken 518-0022; Japan
- Coordinates: 34°47′21″N 136°07′25″E
- System: Regional rail station
- Operator: JR-West
- Lines: V Kansai Main Line; ■ Iga Line
- Distance: JR-West: 34.6 km (21.5 miles) from Kameyama; Iga Railway: 16.6 km (10.3 miles) from Iga-Kambe
- Platforms: JR-West: 1 side platform and 1 island platform; Iga Railway: 1 side platform (1 semi-bay platform)
- Tracks: JR-West: 3; Iga Railway: 1
- Train operators: JR-West; Iga Railway
- Bus stands: 1
- Connections: Mie Kotsu: 31 and 71 at Iga-Ueno-ekimae

Construction
- Structure type: At grade
- Cycle facilities: Available
- Accessible: Yes (2 accessible bathrooms)

Other information
- Website: Official website

History
- Opened: JR-West: 15 January 1897; Iga Railway: 8 August 1916
- Electrified: Iga Railway: 1926
- Former names: JR-West: Ueno (1897—1916); Iga Railway: Ueno Station Liaison Office (1916—1920)

Passengers
- FY 2023: JR-West: 956 daily; Iga Railway: 278 daily (2019)
Services
Preceding station	JRW	Following station
Shimagahara toward Kamo	Kansai Line	Sanagu toward Kameyama and Tsuge
Shimagahara toward Kamo	Kansai Line	Terminus
Preceding station	Iga Railway	Following station
Terminus	Iga Line	Nii toward Iga-Kambe
Location
- Location within Mie Prefecture Location within Japan

Iga-Ueno Station (伊賀上野駅, Iga-Ueno-eki) is an interchange passenger railway station located in the city of Iga, Mie Prefecture, Japan, operated by West Japan Railway Company (JR-West).

== Lines ==
Iga-Ueno Station is served by the JR Kansai Main Line and is located 94.5 rail kilometres from the terminus of the line at Nagoya Station and 34.6 rail kilometers from Kameyama Station. It is also a terminus of the Iga Railway Iga Line and is 16.6 rail kilometers from the opposing terminus of that line at Iga-Kambe Station.

== Layout ==
The station consists of a side platform which is cut away on one side to form a semi-bay platform, and in an island platform with four tracks on the ground level, connected by a footbridge. The Iga Line track is electrified but the Kansai Line tracks are not. The station has a Midori no Madoguchi staffed ticket office.

=== Platforms ===
1	■ Iga Line	for Uenoshi toward Iga-Kambe
2	■ Kansai Line	for Kamo
3	■ Kansai Line	for Kameyama and Tsuge
4	■ Kansai Line	for Kamo / for Kameyama and Tsuge

== Adjacent stations ==
«	Service	»
Kansai Line
Sanagu	Local	Shimagahara
Iga Line
Terminus	Local	Nii

== History ==
Iga-Ueno Station was opened on January 15, 1897 as Ueno Station (上野駅, Ueno-eki). The line was nationalized on October 1, 1907, becoming part of the Imperial Government Railways (IGR), which became Japan National Railways (JNR) after World War II. The station name was changed to its present name on September 11, 1916. Freight operations were discontinued from February 1, 1984. With the privatization of JNR on April 1, 1987, the station came under the control of West Japan Railway Company (JR-West).

The Iga Railway began operations on August 8, 1916. Through a series of mergers, the line became part of the Kintetsu group by June 1, 1944, but was spun-out as an independent company again on October 1, 2007.

== Passenger statistics ==
In fiscal 2019, the JR station was used by an average of 525 passengers daily and the Iga Railway portion by 278 passengers daily (boarding passengers only).

== Surrounding area ==
- Japan National Route 422
- Kizu River
- Tsuge River

== See also ==
- List of railway stations in Japan
