= Kameyama Station (Mie) =

Railway station in Kameyama, Mie Prefecture, Japan

CJ17 Kameyama Station 亀山駅
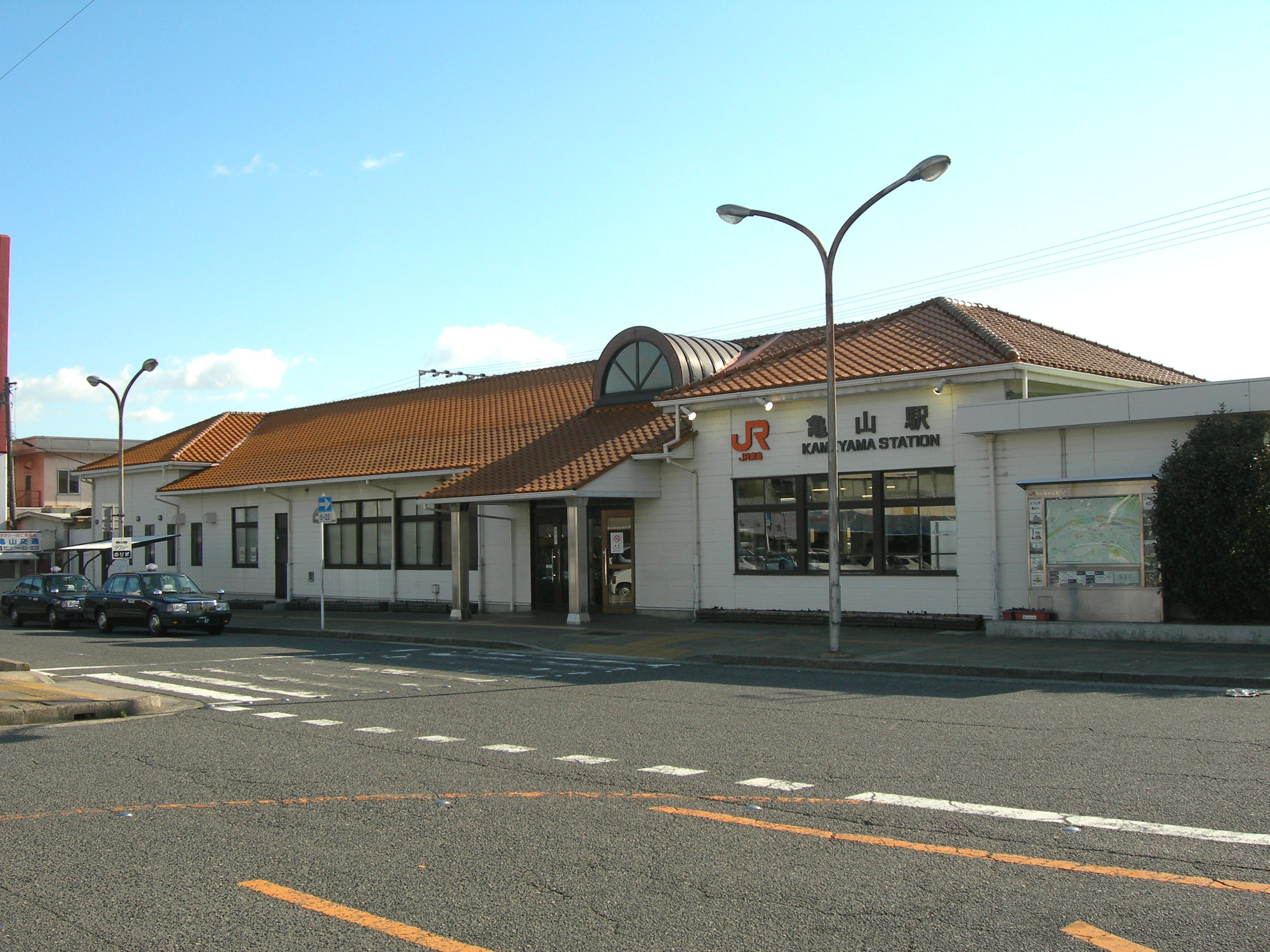
- Kameyama Station in January 2010

General information
- Location: 198, Miyuki-chō, Kameyama City, Mie Prefecture 519-0155; Japan
- Coordinates: 34°51′01″N 136°26′59″E
- Owner: JR Central
- Operator: JR Central; JR West (Kansai Main Line tracks to Nara)
- Lines: Passenger train services: Kansai Main Line (Nagoya—Kameyama); Kisei Main Line; V (Kameyama—Kamo); Railway tracks: Kansai Main Line; Kisei Main Line
- Distance: Kansai Line (Nagoya—Kameyama): 59.9 km (37.2 miles) from Nagoya; Kisei Line: 180.2 km (112.0 miles) from Shingū; Kansai Line (Kameyama—Kamo): 61.0 km (37.9 miles) from Kamo
- Platforms: 1 side platform + 2 island platforms
- Tracks: 5
- Train operators: JR Central; JR West
- Bus stands: 1
- Connections: Mie Kotsu: 30, 55, 71, and 91 at Kameyama-ekimae; Kameyama City Community Bus: Sawayaka-gō, Noto / Shirakawa Route, Eastern Route, and Southern Route at Kameyama-ekimae

Construction
- Structure type: At grade
- Cycle facilities: Available
- Accessible: Yes (1 elevator for the each platform and 1 accessible bathroom)

Other information
- Website: JR Central website JR West website

History
- Opened: 25 December 1890; 135 years ago

Passengers
- 2,156: 2,203 daily
Services
Preceding station	JR Central	Following station
	Kansai Line	
Terminus	Local	Idagawa toward Nagoya
Terminus	Semi Rapid	Idagawa toward Nagoya
Terminus	Rapid	Idagawa toward Nagoya
Shimonoshō toward Shingū, Toba, Iseshi, Misedani, and Taki	Kisei Line	Terminus
Preceding station	JRW	Following station
Seki toward Kamo and Iga-Ueno	Kansai Line	Terminus
Location
- Location within Mie Prefecture Location within Japan

Kameyama Station (亀山駅, Kameyama-eki) is a junction passenger railway station located in the city of Kameyama, Mie Prefecture, Japan, owned by Central Japan Railway Company (JR Central).

== Lines ==
Kameyama Station is served by the Kansai Main Line and is located 59.9 kilometers from Nagoya Station on the Kansai Main Line. It is also the northern terminal station of the Kisei Main Line and is located 180.2 kilometers from the opposing terminal of the JR Central portion of the line at Shingū Station and 384.2 kilometers from the ultimate terminal of the JR West portion of the line at Wakayamashi Station.

== Layout ==
The station consists of one side platform and two island platforms, serving five tracks, connected by an elevated concourse. The station has a Midori no Madoguchi staffed ticket office.

=== Platforms ===
1	■ Kansai Line	for Yokkaichi, Kuwana and Nagoya
2	■ Kansai Line	for Yokkaichi, Kuwana and Nagoya
3	■ Kansai Line	for Yokkaichi, Kuwana and Nagoya
3	■ Kansai Line	for Kamo and Iga-Ueno
4	■ Kisei Line	for Shingū, Toba, Iseshi, Misedani, and Taki (partly)
4	■ Kansai Line	for Kamo (2nd and 3rd trains only)
5	■ Kisei Line	for Shingū, Toba, Iseshi, Misedani, and Taki
5	■ Kansai Line	for Kamo (1st train only)

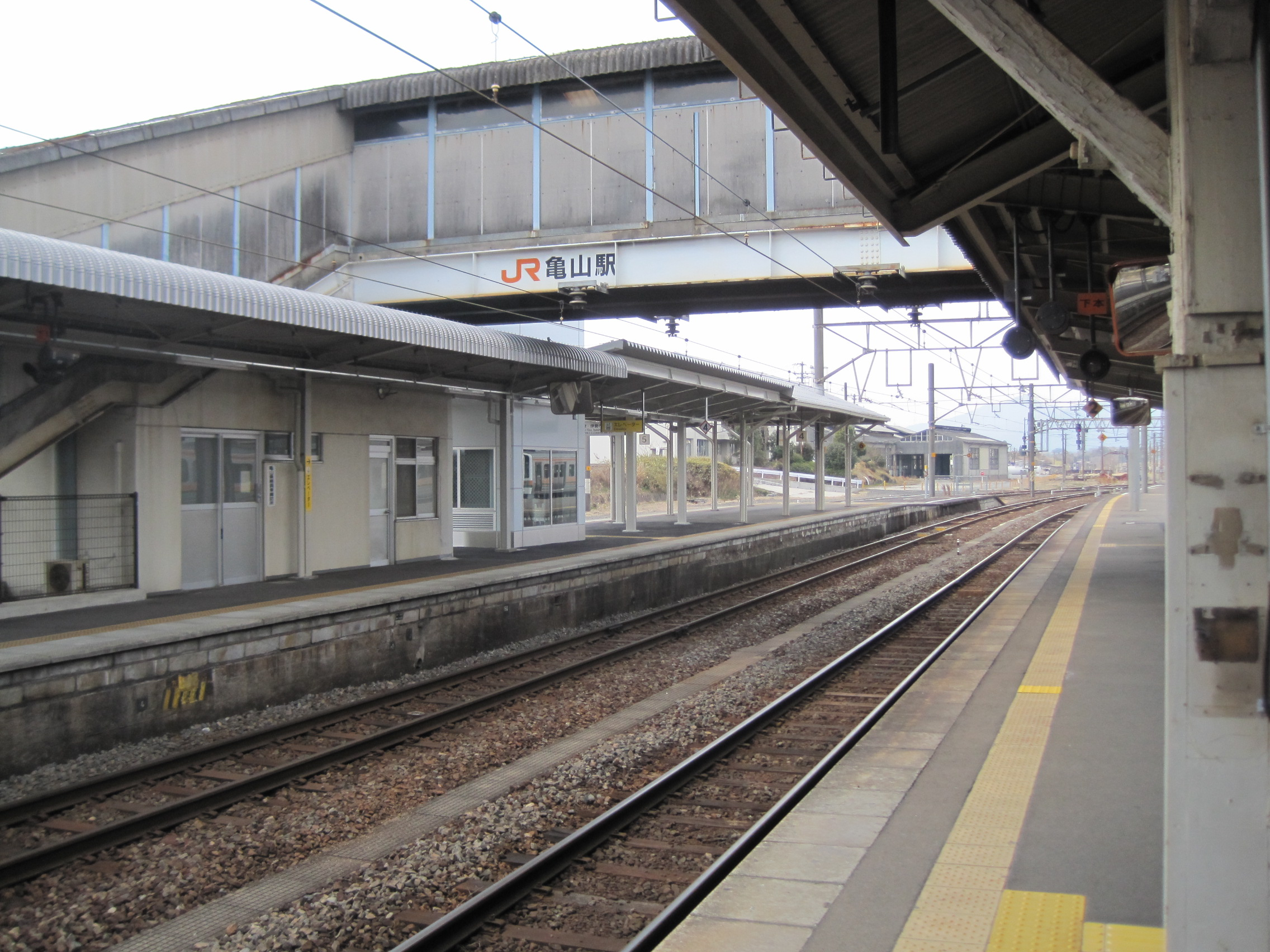
The platforms in March 2011

== History ==
Kameyama Station was opened on December 25, 1890, as a station on the Kansai Railway. The Kansai Railway was nationalized on October 1, 1907, and the station became part of the Imperial Government Railways (IGR) system. A new station building was completed on November 3, 1913. The IGR became Japan National Railways (JNR) after World War II. The station was absorbed into the JR Central network upon the privatization of JNR on April 1, 1987. A new station building was completed in 2012.

Station numbering was introduced to the section of the Kansai Main Line operated JR Central in March 2018; Kameyama Station was assigned station number CI17.

== Passenger statistics ==
In fiscal 2019, the station was used by an average of 2,156 passengers daily (boarding passengers only).

== Surrounding area ==
- Kameyama Shrine
- Kameyama Castle Ruins
- Kameyama City Hall
- Kameyama Museum of History
- Kameyama City Library

== See also ==
- List of railway stations in Japan
