= Kamo Station (Kyoto) =

Railway station in Kizugawa, Kyoto Prefecture, Japan

Kamo Station 加茂駅
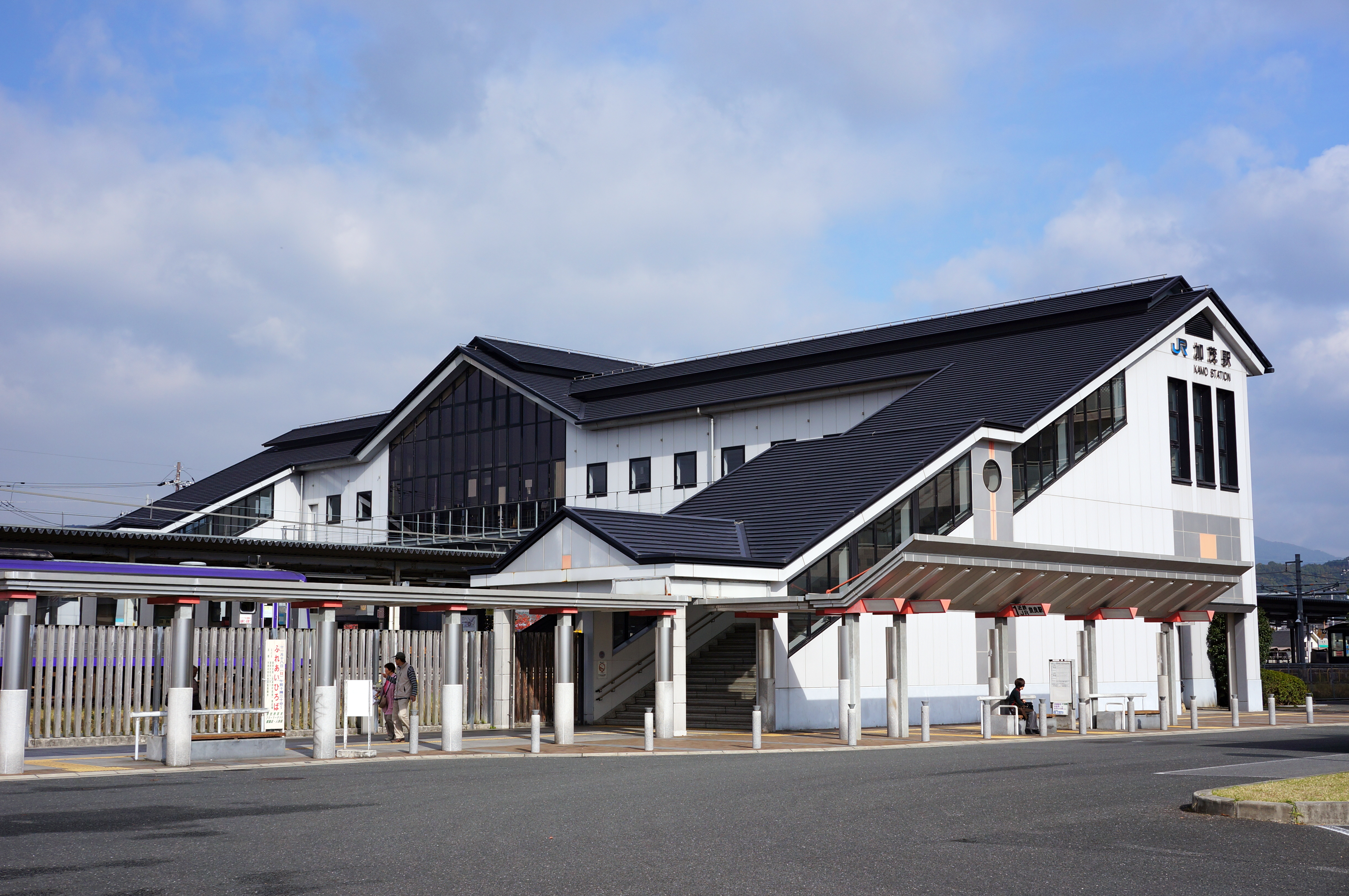
- Kamo Station (November 2012)

General information
- Location: 1-6-3, Kamochō-ekinishi, Kizugawa City, Kyoto Prefecture; Japan
- Coordinates: 34°45′10″N 135°52′11″E
- Owner: JR West
- Operator: JR West
- Lines: V Kansai Line (Kameyama—Kamo) (Kansai Main Line); Q Yamatoji Line (Kamo—JR Namba) (Kansai Main Line)
- Distance: Kansai Line: 61.0 km (37.9 miles) from Kameyama; Yamatoji Line: 54.0 km (33.6 miles) from JR Namba
- Platforms: 2 island platforms
- Tracks: 4 (1 storage)
- Bus stands: 2
- Connections: Nara Kotsu Bus Lines: 10, 107, 109, 109 Exp., and 209 at Kamo-eki (East Exit) 66 at Kamo-eki (West Exit); Kizugawa City Community Bus: Kamo Bus: Tōno Route at Kamo-eki (East Exit) Okuhata Route at Kamo-eki (West Exit)

Construction
- Structure type: At grade
- Cycle facilities: Available
- Accessible: Yes (2 elevators for the ticket gate, 1 elevator for each platform and 1 accessible bathroom)

Other information
- Station code: Q39
- Website: Official website

History
- Opened: 11 November 1897; 128 years ago

Passengers
- FY 2023: 3,662 daily

Services
Preceding station	JRW	Following station
V Kansai Line
Terminus	Kansai Line	Kasagi toward Kameyama, Tsuge, and Iga-Ueno
Q Yamatoji Line
Kizu toward Ōsaka, JR Namba, Ōji, and Nara	Local	Terminus
Kizu toward Ōsaka	Regional Rapid Service	Terminus
Kizu toward JR Namba	Rapid Service	Terminus
Kizu toward Ōsaka	Yamatoji Rapid Service	Terminus
Former services
Former services
Preceding station	Imperial Government Railways	Following station
Kizu toward Minatomachi	Nagoya to Minatomachi (1907—1910)	Kasagi toward Nagoya
Daibutsu	Kamo to Nara (Freight only) (1907—1908)	Kasagi
Preceding station	Kansai Railways	Following station
Kizu toward Minatomachi	Main Line (1907)	Kasagi toward Nagoya
Daibutsu	Daibutsu Line (Freigt only) (1907)	Kasagi
Daibutsu toward Minatomachi	Main Line (1900—1907)	Kasagi toward Nagoya
Daibutsu toward Nara	Kamo to Nara (1899—1900)	Kasagi toward Nagoya
Daibutsu; Terminus	Kamo to Nara (1898—1899)	Kasagi toward Nagoya
Shin-Kizu toward Sakuranomiya	Branch (1901—1907)	Kasagi toward Nagoya
Shin-Kizu toward Amijima	Branch (1900—1901); Tsuge to Amijima (1898—1900)	Kasagi toward Nagoya
Terminus	Tsuge to Kamo (1897—1898)	Kasagi toward Nagoya
Location
- Location within Kyoto Prefecture Location within Kansai region Location within Japan

Kamo Station (加茂駅, Kamo-eki) is a railway station of West Japan Railway Company (JR-West) in Kizugawa, Kyoto, Japan. Although the station is on the Kansai Main Line as rail infrastructure, it serves as terminal by both the Kansai Line and Yamatoji Line in terms of passenger train services.

== Lines ==
- JR West (Kansai Main Line)
  - V Kansai Line
  - Q Yamatoji Line

== Layout ==
The station has two island platforms with three tracks on the ground level.

=== Platforms ===
1	■ Yamatoji Line–Local	for Ōji, and Nara
1	■ Yamatoji Line—Regional Rapid Service	for Ōsaka
1	■ Yamatoji Line—Rapid Service	for JR Namba
1	■ Yamatoji Line—Yamatoji Rapid Service	for Ōsaka
2	■ Kansai Line	for Kameyama, Tsuge, and Iga-Ueno
3	■ Yamatoji Line—Local	for JR Namba and Nara (1st train and 4th to last train only)
3	■ Yamatoji Line—Rapid Service	for JR Namba (5th to last train only)
4	■ Yamatoji Line—Local	for Nara (9th train only)
4	■ Yamatoji Line—Regional Rapid Service	for Ōsaka (4th and 7th trains only)
4	■ Yamatoji Line—Rapid Service	for JR Namba (2nd and 6th trains only)
4	■ Yamatoji Line—Yamatoji Rapid Service	for Ōsaka (2nd, 4th, and 8th trains only)
4	■ Kansai Line	for Kameyama (1st train and 3rd to last train only)
	■ Kansai Line	Storage track

== History ==
The station opened in 1897 as a station on the Kansai Railway, which connected Osaka and Nagoya via Nara. The Kansai Railway was nationalized in 1907 and became the Kansai Main Line. With the privatization of Japanese National Railways (JNR) on 1 April 1987, the station came under the control of JR West.

== Passenger statistics ==
According to the Kyoto Prefecture statistical book, the average number of passengers per day is as follows.

Year	Passengers
1999	2,945
2000	3,008
2001	3,126
2002	3,077
2003	3,058
2004	3,093
2005	3,134
2006	3,079
2007	3,014
2008	2,967
2009	2,825
2010	2,740
2011	2,623
2012	2,581
2013	2,556
2014	2,430
2015	2,385
2016	2,359

== See also ==
- List of railway stations in Japan
