= List of mergers in Mie Prefecture =

Here is a list of mergers in Mie Prefecture, Japan since the Heisei era.

== Mergers from April 1, 1999 to Present ==
- On December 1, 2003 - The former town of Inabe absorbed the towns of Daian, Fujiwara and Hokusei (all from Inabe District) were merged to create new and establish into the city of Inabe.
- On October 1, 2004 - The former town of Shima absorbed the towns of Ago, Daiō, Hamajima and Isobe (all from Shima District) to create the city of Shima. Shima District was dissolved as a result of this merger.
- On November 1, 2004 - The city of Ueno was merged with the towns of Iga (former) and Ayama, the villages of Ōyamada and Shimagahara (all from Ayama District) and the town of Aoyama (from Naga District) to create the city of Iga. Ayama District and Naga District were both dissolved as a result of this merger.
- On December 6, 2004 - The old city of Kuwana absorbed the towns of Nagashima and Tado (both from Kuwana District) to create new and expanded city of Kuwana.
- On January 1, 2005 - The old city of Matsusaka absorbed the towns of Mikumo and Ureshino (both from Ichishi District), and the towns of Iinan and Iitaka (both from Iinan District) to create the new and expanded city of Matsusaka. Iinan District was dissolved as a result of this merger.
- On January 11, 2005 - The town of Seki (from Suzuka District) was merged into the expanded city of Kameyama. Suzuka District was dissolved as a result of this merger.
- On February 7, 2005 - The town of Kusu (from Mie District) was merged into the city of Yokkaichi.
- On February 14, 2005 - The towns of Kisei and Ōmiya, and the village of Ōuchiyama (all from Watarai District) were merged to create the town of Taiki.
- On October 1, 2005 - The towns of Nansei and Nantō (both from Watarai District) were merged to create the town of Minamiise.
- On October 1, 2005 - The towns of Kiinagashima and Miyama (both from Kitamuro District) were merged to create the town of Kihoku.
- On November 1, 2005 - The town of Kiwa (from Minamimuro District) was merged into the expanded city of Kumano.
- On November 1, 2005 - The old city of Ise absorbed the towns of Futami and Obata and the village of Misono (all from Watarai District) to create the new and expanded city of Ise.
- On January 1, 2006 - The old city of Tsu absorbed the city of Hisai, the towns of Anō, Geinō and Kawage, the village of Misato (all from Age), the towns of Hakusan, Ichishi and Karasu, and the village of Misugi (all from Ichishi Dustrict) to create the new and expanded city of Tsu. Age District and Ichishi District were both dissolved as a result of this merger.
- On January 1, 2006 - The village of Seiwa (from Taki District) was merged into the expanded town of Taki.
- On January 10, 2006 - The village of Miyagawa (from Taki District) was merged into the expanded town of Ōdai.
- On January 10, 2006 - The village of Udono (from Minamimuro District) was merged into the expanded town of Kihō. With this merger, all villages in Mie Prefecture have been dissolved.
