= Naga Hills District =

Naga Hills District may refer to:

- Hkamti District, a district in far northern Sagaing Division of Burma
- Naga Hills District, British India, that was later merged with Tuensang to form the Indian state of Nagaland

== See also ==
- Naga District, Mie, a district in Mie, Japan
- Naga District, Wakayama, a former district in Wakayama, Japan
- Naga (disambiguation)
