= ZTV =

ZTV may refer to:

- ZTV (Sweden), former Swedish television station (1991–2010)
- ZTV (Japan), Japanese cable television operator headquartered in Tsu, Mie Prefecture, Japan
- ZTV Norway, former Norwegian television channel (1995–1996, 2002–2007)
- Zee TV, Indian cable and satellite television channel
- Z Channel, United States pay cable service headquartered in Santa Monica, California
