= Mihakayama Kofun =

Kofun period burial mound in Iga, Japan

- 御墓山古墳 (Japanese)
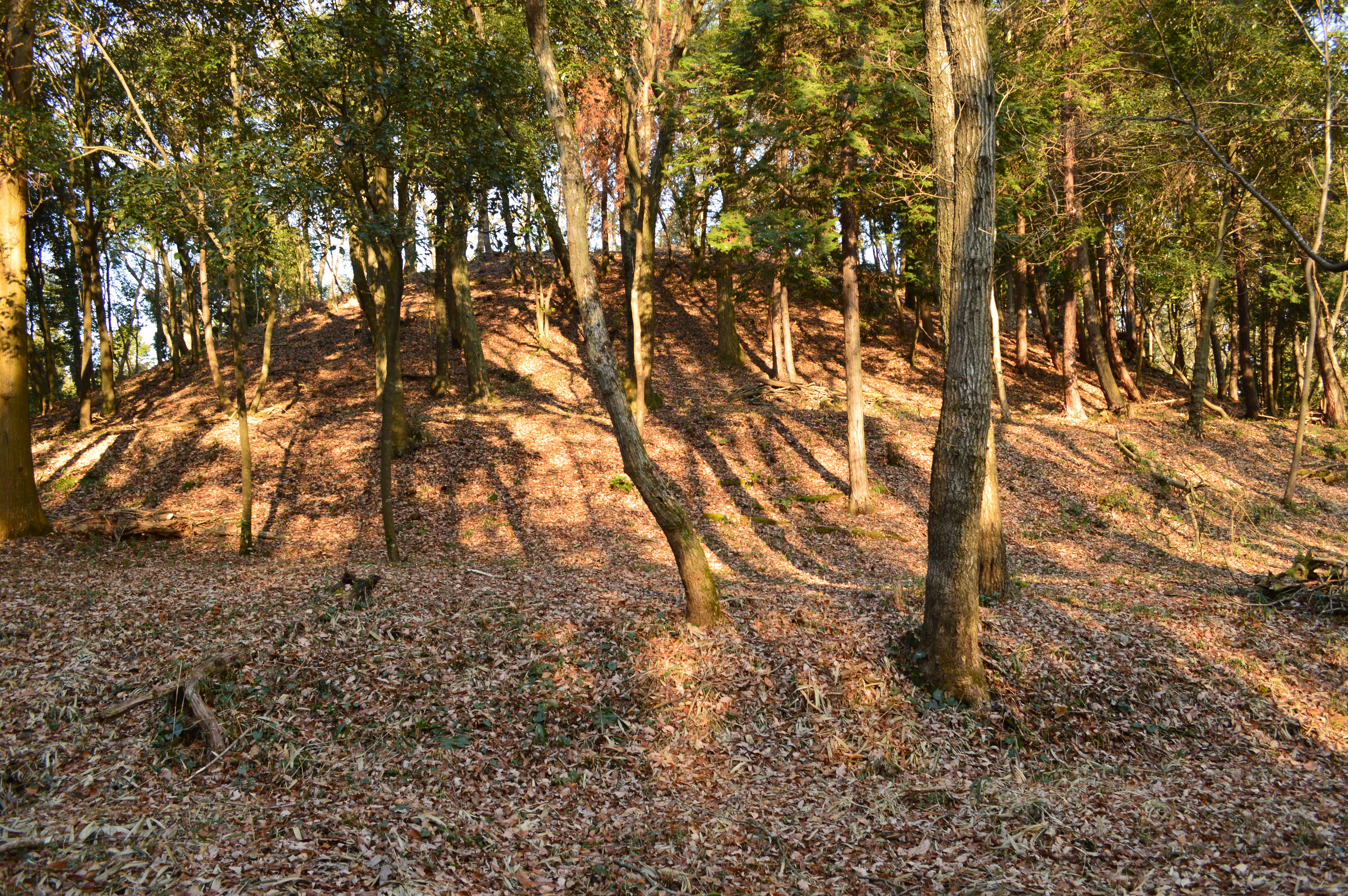
- Mihakayama Kofun

- Mihakayama Kofun Mihakayama Kofun (Japan)
- 34°48′07″N 136°10′24″E
- Type: Kofun
- Periods: Kofun period
- Location: Iga, Mie, Japan
- Region: Kansai region

History
- Built: 5th century AD

Site notes
- Public access: Yes (no public facilities)

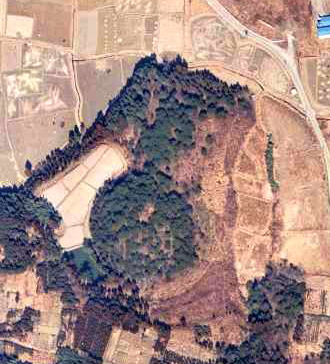
Aerial view of the kofun

The Mihakayama Kofun (御墓山古墳) is a Kofun period burial mound located between the Sanagu neighborhood of Iga, Mie in the Kansai region of Japan. The tumulus was designated a National Historic Site of Japan in 1921, with the area under protection expanded in 1970. With a total length of 188 meters, it is the largest kofun in Mie Prefecture. It is also known as the "Ohakayama Kofun", after an alternative pronunciation of the kanji in its name.

== Overview ==
The Mihakayama Kofun is located in the northeastern part of the Ueno Basin in western Mie Prefecture. It is a zenpō-kōen-fun (前方後円墳), which is shaped like a keyhole, having one square end and one circular end, when viewed from above, and is orientated to the northeast. It was originally covered in fukiishi and the shards of cylindrical, house-shaped and figurative haniwa have been found in the vicinity. The existence of a moat has been clarified only on the south side of the posterior circular portion. The location and construction of the burial chamber remains unknown as it has never been excavated; however, a depression in the surface of the posterior circular portion may indicate that the tumulus has been robbed in antiquity. The mound has a two-tier construction, but the anterior portion was made to look like a three-tier structure by using a stepped technique. From its construction technique and haniwa, the tumulus is estimated to have been built in the 5th century AD, or the middle of the Kofun period. The main tumulus Is accompanied on its eastern perimeter by two smaller square-type (hōfun (方墳)) measuring ten meters on each side. The surrounding area also has a number of other large tumuli from the early Kofun period, including the Higashiyama Kofun and the Yamagami Yoriken Kofun, indicating that this area was the center of the ancient Iga Kingdom but the scale of the Mihakayama Kofun is larger than its predecessors and much larger than subsequent tumuli which were constructed on the opposite bank of the Tsuge River.

There is a long tradition connecting this kofun to the son of the semi-legendary Emperor Kōgen, Prince Ōhiko (大彦命) who is worshipped at the nearby Aekuni Shrine, the ichinomiya of Iga Province and the ancestor of the Abe clan.

The tumulus is located about a 20-minute walk from Sanagu Station on the JR West Kansai Main Line.

Overall length
188 meters
Posterior circular portion
110 meter diameter x 14 meter high x 2-tier
Anterior rectangular portion
80 meters wide x 10 meters high x 3-tier

== See also ==
- List of Historic Sites of Japan (Mie)
