= Hido Station =

Railway station in Iga, Mie Prefecture, Japan

Hido Station 比土駅
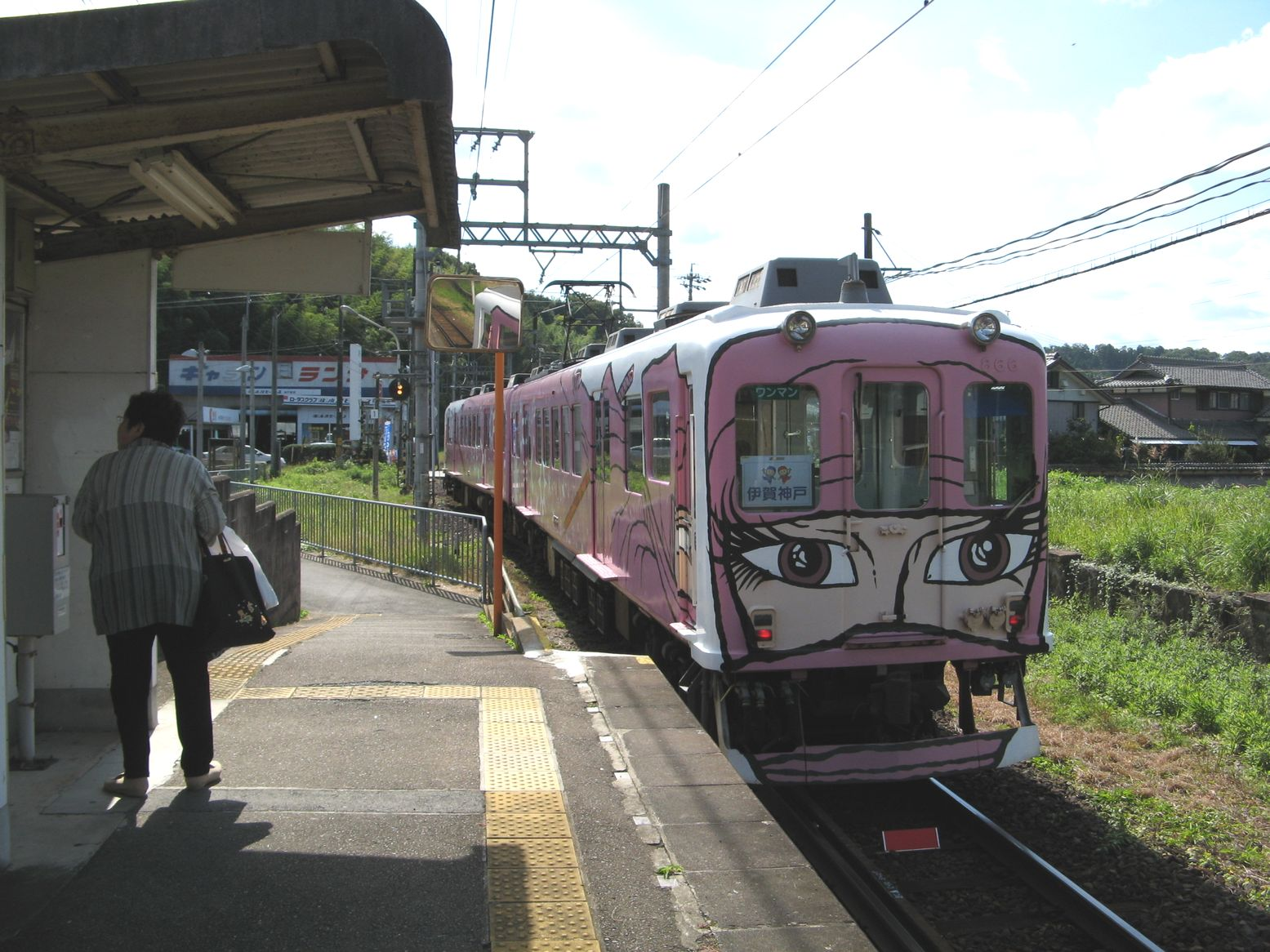
- Hido Station in October 2007

General information
- Location: 130 Hido, Iga-shi, Mie-ken 518-0115; Mie Prefecture; Japan
- Coordinates: 34.6757°N 136.1604°E
- Operator: Iga Railway
- Line: ■ Iga Line
- Distance: 15.6 km from Iga-Ueno
- Platforms: 1 side platforms

Other information
- Website: Official website

History
- Opened: July 18, 1922

Passengers
- FY2019: 9 daily
Location
- Location within Mie Prefecture Location within Japan

Hido Station (比土駅, Hido-eki) is a passenger railway station in located in the city of Iga, Mie Prefecture, Japan, operated by the private railway operator Iga Railway.

== Lines ==
Hido Station is served by the Iga Line, and is located 15.6 rail kilometers from the starting point of the line at Iga-Ueno Station.

== Station layout ==
The station consists of a single side platform serving bidirectional traffic. The station is unattended and has no station building. The platform is short and can only handle trains of two cars in length.

== Platform ==
| 1 | ■ Iga Line | For Iga-Ueno; For Iga-Kambe |

== Adjacent stations ==
| « | Service | » |
Iga Line
| Uebayashi | - | Iga-Kambe |

== History ==
Hido Station was opened on July 18, 1922. Through a series of mergers, the Iga Line became part of the Kintetsu network by June 1, 1944, but was spun out as an independent company in October 2007. All freight operations were discontinued on October 1, 1973 and the station building was removed on November 16, 1999.

== Passenger statistics ==
In fiscal 2019, the station was used by an average of 9 passengers daily (boarding passengers only).

== Surrounding area ==
- Jonoetsu Archaeological Park
- Japan National Route 422
- Kizu River

== See also ==
- List of railway stations in Japan
