= Ichishi Station =

Railway station in Tsu, Mie Prefecture, Japan

Ichishi Station 一志駅
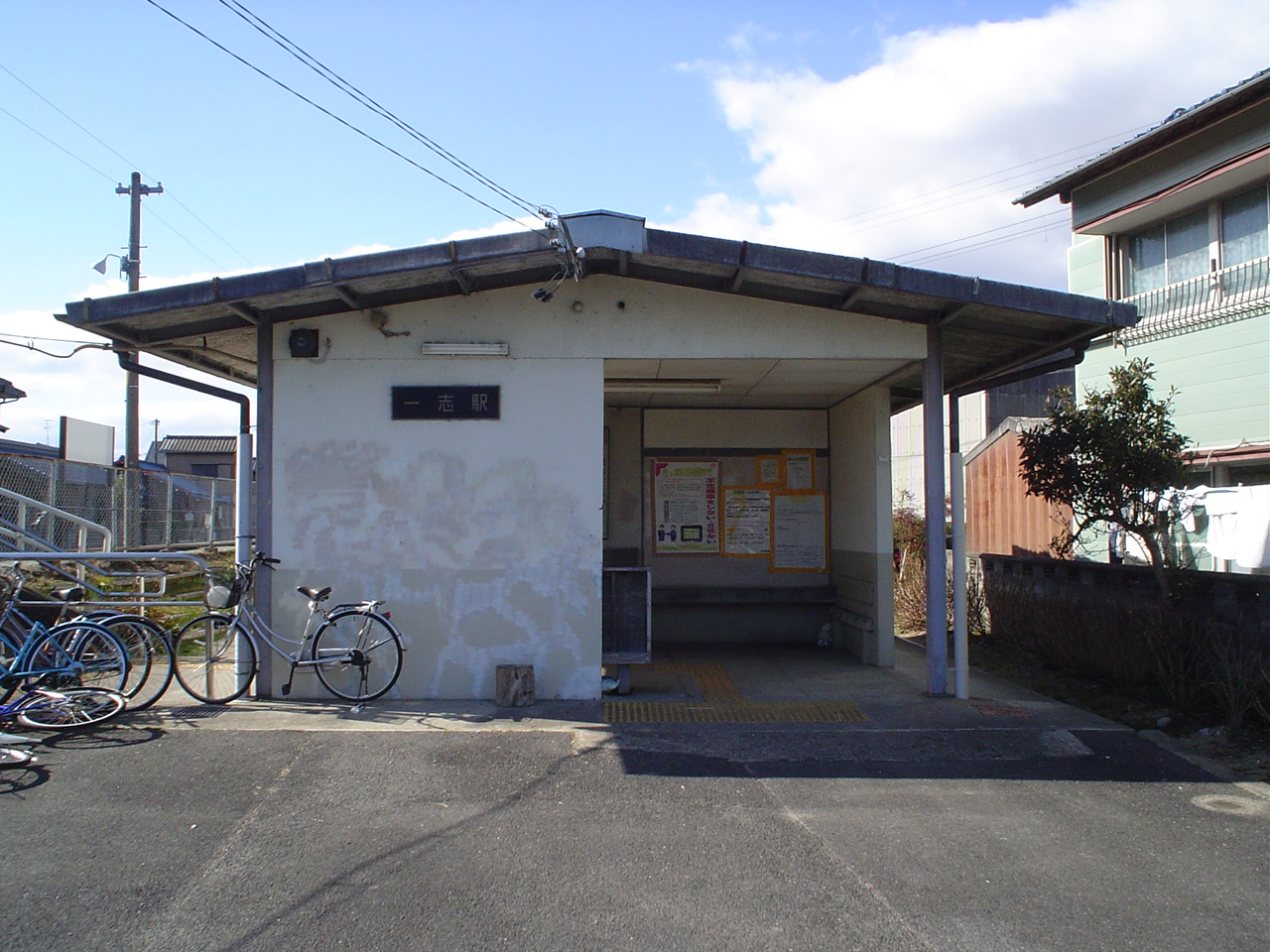
- Ichishi Station

General information
- Location: Ichishi-cho Hata 1548, Tsu-shi, Mie-ken 515-2515; Japan
- Coordinates: 34.6553°N 136.4362°E
- Operator: JR Tōkai
- Line: ■ Meishō Line
- Distance: 13.0 km from Matsusaka
- Platforms: 1 side platform
- Connections: Bus terminal

History
- Opened: January 20, 1930
- Former names: Ise-Tajiri Station (until 1968)

Passengers
- FY2019: 109 daily
Location
- Location within Mie Prefecture Location within Japan

Ichishi Station (一志駅, Ichishi-eki) is a passenger railway station in located in the city of Tsu, Mie Prefecture, Japan, operated by Central Japan Railway Company (JR Tōkai).

== Lines ==
Ichishi Station is served by the Meishō Line, and is 13.0 rail kilometers from the terminus of the line at Matsusaka Station.

== Station layout ==
The station consists of a single side platform serving one bi-directional track. The station is unattended.

=== Platforms ===
1	■ Meishō Line	For Matsusaka; For Ise-Okitsu

== Adjacent stations ==
«	Service	»
Meishō Line
Ise-Hata	Local	Isegi

== History ==
Ichishi Station was opened on January 20, 1930, as Ise-Tajiri Station (伊勢田尻駅, Ise-Tajiri-eki) on the Japanese Government Railways (JGR), which became the Japan National Railways (JNR) after World War II. On October 1, 1968, the station was rebuilt 300 meters closer to Matsusaka Station, and renamed to its present name. Freight operations were discontinued in February 1984. Along with its division and privatization of JNR on April 1, 1987, the station came under the control and operation of the Central Japan Railway Company.

== Passenger statistics ==
In fiscal 2019, the station was used by an average of 109 passengers daily (boarding passengers only).

== Surrounding area ==
- Tsu City Hall Ichishi General Branch

== See also ==
- List of railway stations in Japan
