= Ise-Ōi Station =

Railway station in Tsu, Mie Prefecture, Japan

Ise-Ōi Station 伊勢大井駅
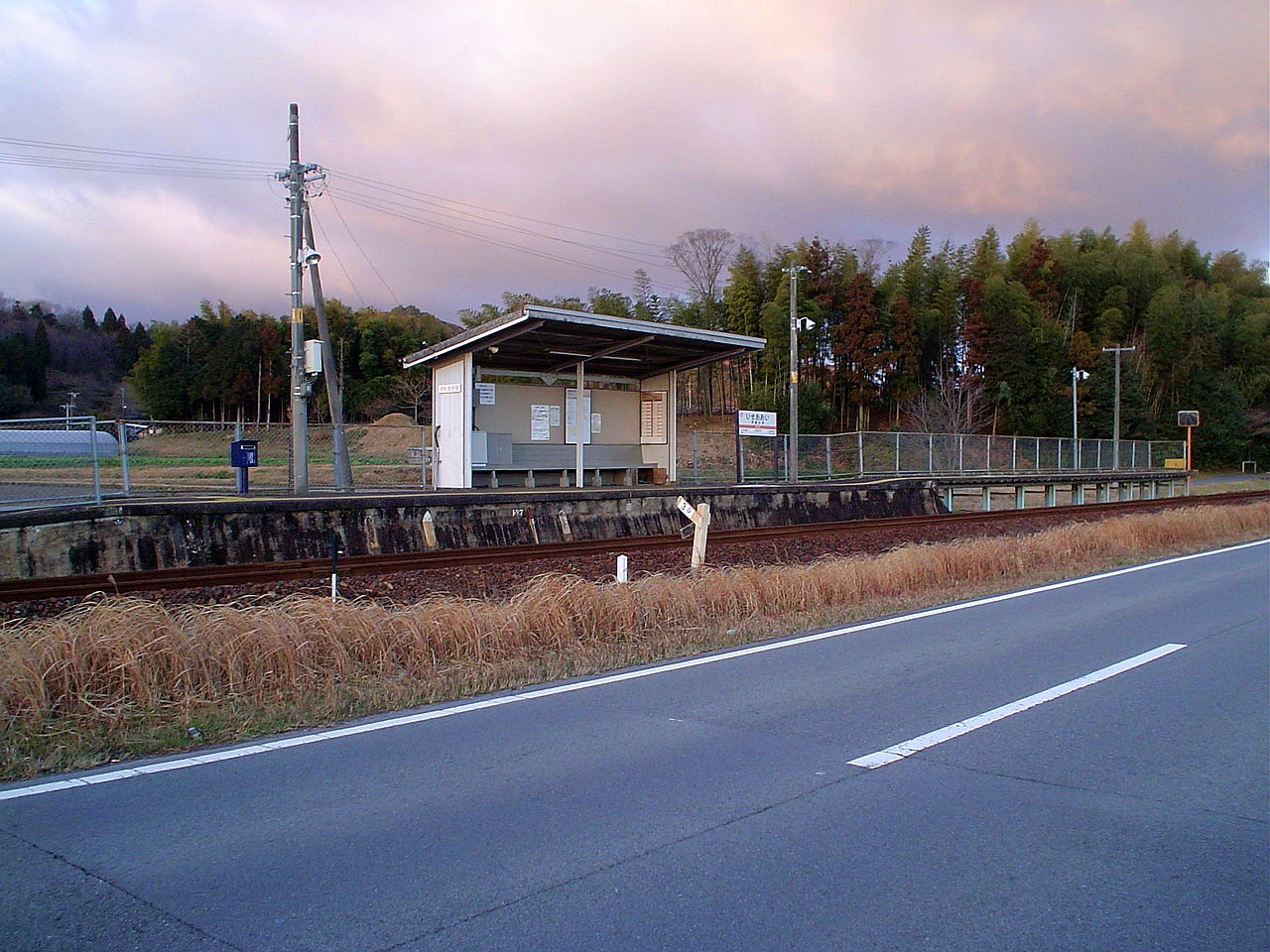
- Ise-Ōi Station

General information
- Location: Ichishi-cho Isegi 638, Tsu-shi, Mie-ken 515-2523; Japan
- Coordinates: 34.6498°N 136.3853°E
- Operator: JR Tōkai
- Line: ■ Meishō Line
- Distance: 18.5 km from Matsusaka
- Platforms: 1 side platform
- Connections: Bus terminal

History
- Opened: January 20, 1938

Passengers
- FY2019: 8 daily
Location
- Location within Mie Prefecture Location within Japan

Ise-Ōi Station (伊勢大井駅, Ise-Ōi-eki) is a passenger railway station in located in the city of Tsu, Mie Prefecture, Japan, operated by Central Japan Railway Company (JR Tōkai).

== Lines ==
Ise-Ōi Station is served by the Meishō Line, and is 18.5 rail kilometers from the terminus of the line at Matsusaka Station.

== Station layout ==
The station consists of a single side platform serving bi-directional traffic. There is no station building, but a small structure located on the platform. The station is unattended.

=== Platforms ===
1	■ Meishō Line	For Matsusaka; For Ise-Okitsu

== Adjacent stations ==
«	Service	»
Meishō Line
Isegi	Local	Ise-Kawaguchi

== History ==
Ise-Ōi Station was opened on January 20, 1938 as a station on the Japanese Government Railways (JGR), which became the Japan National Railways (JNR) after World War II. Freight operations were discontinued in October 1965. Along with its division and privatization of JNR on April 1, 1987, the station came under the control and operation of the Central Japan Railway Company.

== Passenger statistics ==
In fiscal 2019, the station was used by an average of 8 passengers daily (boarding passengers only).

== Surrounding area ==
- Ise-Nakagawa Country Club

== See also ==
- List of railway stations in Japan
