= Aoyama, Mie =

Dissolved municipality in Mie prefecture, Japan

Aoyama (青山町, Aoyama-chō) was a town located in Naga District, Mie Prefecture, Japan.

As of 2003, the town had an estimated population of 11,590 and a density of 106.33 persons per km^{2}. The total area was 109.00 km^{2}.

On November 1, 2004, Aoyama, along with the city of Ueno, the towns of Iga (former) and Ayama, and the villages of Ōyamada and Shimagahara (all from Ayama District), was merged to create the city of Iga.
