= Tsu-shimmachi Station =

Railway station in Tsu, Mie Prefecture, Japan

Tsu-Shimmachi Station 津新町駅
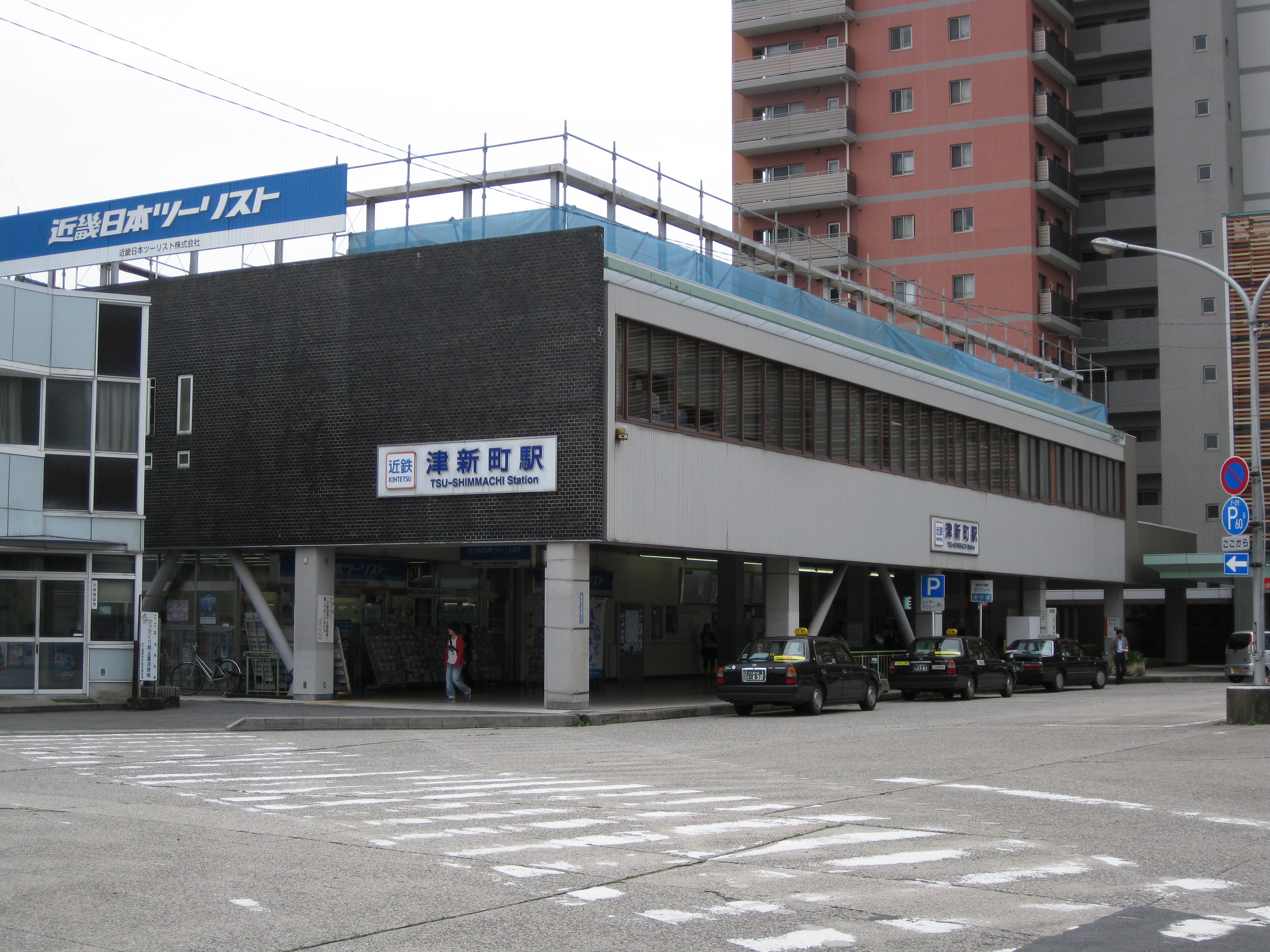
- Tsu-Shimmachi Station

General information
- Location: 1-5-35 Shimmachi-cho, Tsu-shi, Mie-ken 514-0042; Japan
- Coordinates: 34.7158°N 136.5002°E
- Operator: Kintetsu Railway
- Line: Nagoya Line
- Distance: 86.6 km from Kintetsu Nagoya
- Platforms: 1 side + 1 island platforms

Other information
- Station code: E40
- Website: Official website

History
- Opened: July 4, 1931

Passengers
- FY2019: 6966 daily
Location
- Location within Mie Prefecture Location within Japan

Tsu-Shimmachi Station (津新町駅, Tsu-shimmachi-eki) is a passenger railway station in located in the city of Tsu, Mie Prefecture, Japan, operated by the private railway operator Kintetsu Railway.

== Lines ==
Tsu-Shimmachi Station is served by the Nagoya Line, and is located 86.6 rail kilometers from the starting point of the line at Kintetsu Nagoya Station.

== Station layout ==
The station was consists of one side platform and one island platform serving three tracks. Platform 3 is used for trains which terminate at this station.

=== Platforms ===
1	■ Nagoya Line	for Toba, Osaka Namba, Kashikojima
2, 3	■ Nagoya Line	for Tsu, Kintetsu Yokkaichi, Nagoya

== Adjacent stations ==
«	Service	»
Nagoya Line
Tsu	Express (急行)	Minamigaoka
Tsu	Local (普通)	Minamigaoka

== History ==
Tsu-Shimmachi Station opened on July 4, 1931, as a station on the Sangu Express Electric Railway's Tsu Line. The Tsu Line was renamed the Nagoya Line on December 7, 1938. On March 15, 1941, the Sangu Express Electric Railway merged with Osaka Electric Railway to become a station on Kansai Express Railway's Nagoya Line. This line in turn was merged with the Nankai Electric Railway on June 1, 1944, to form Kintetsu. The station building was rebuilt in 1970, with underpasses connecting the platforms.

== Passenger statistics ==
In fiscal 2019, the station was used by an average of 6966 passengers daily (boarding passengers only).

== Surrounding area ==
- Tsu City Office
- Tsu Chuo Post Office
- Mie Prefectural Tsu High School
- Mie Prefectural Tsu Technical High School
- Tsu City Nishikyonai Junior High School

== See also ==
- List of railway stations in Japan
