= Mie Prefectural College of Nursing =

Public university in Tsu, Mie, Japan

Coordinates: 34°45′36.53″N 136°29′17.69″E

Mie Prefectural College Of Nursing (三重県立看護大学, Mie kenritsu kango daigaku) is a public university in Tsu, Mie, Japan.

Website
