= Hisai Station =

Railway station in Tsu, Mie Prefecture, Japan

Hisai Station 久居駅
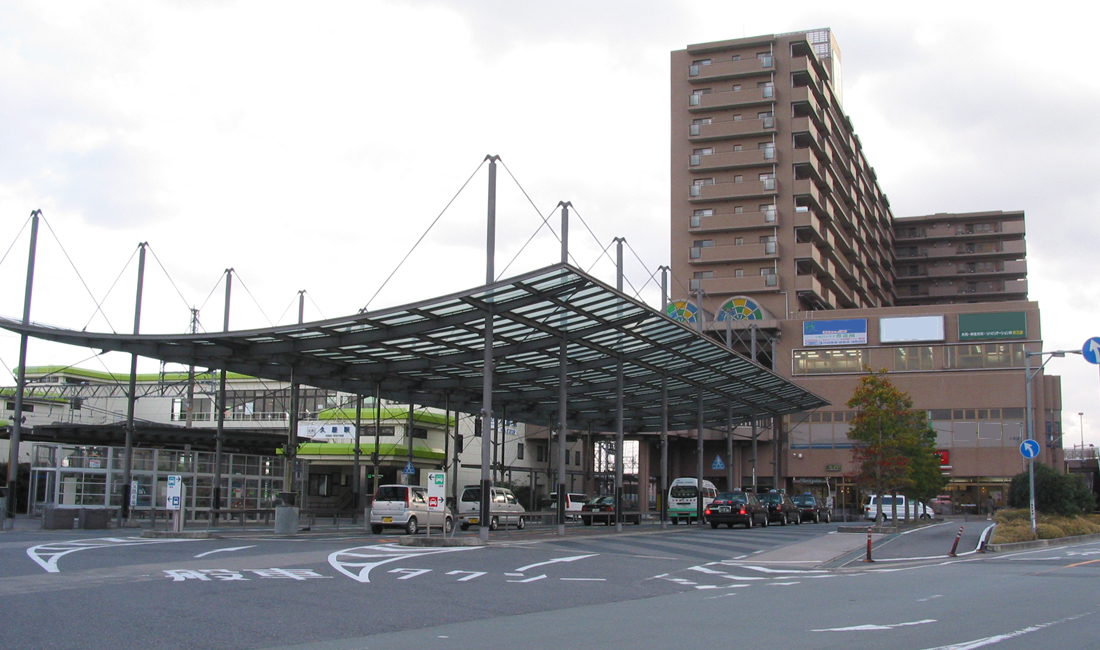
- Hisai Station

General information
- Location: 994-6 Hisai Shinmachi, Tsu-shi, Mie-ken 514-1118; Japan
- Coordinates: 34.6757°N 136.4779°E
- Operator: Kintetsu Railway
- Line: Nagoya Line
- Distance: 74.0 km from Kintetsu Nagoya
- Platforms: 2 side platforms

Other information
- Station code: E42
- Website: Official website

History
- Opened: November 10, 1908

Passengers
- FY2019: 5598 daily
Location
- Location within Mie Prefecture Location within Japan

Hisai Station (久居駅, Hisai-eki) is a passenger railway station in located in the city of Tsu, Mie Prefecture, Japan, operated by the private railway operator Kintetsu Railway.

== Lines ==
Hisai Station is served by the Nagoya Line, and is located 74.0 rail kilometers from the starting point of the line at Kintetsu Nagoya Station.

== Station layout ==
The station was consists of two opposed side platforms, connected by a footbridge.

=== Platforms ===
1	■ Nagoya Line	for Ise-Nakagawa, Osaka, Kobe and Kashikojima
2	■ Nagoya Line	for Tsu, Yokkaichi and Nagoya

== Adjacent stations ==
Passengers to Osaka must change trains at Ise-Nakagawa Station (also at Tsuruhashi for Kobe) as no through trains to and from Osaka stop at this station.Local and express stop, and some Limited express stop in the morning and at night. The train connecting the Nagoya and Ise departing from 6 o'clock to 9:00. And the train connecting Nagoya and Ise departing from Kintetsu Nagoya Station stops after 6pm.

«	Service	»
Kintetsu Nagoya Line
Minamigaoka	Local	Momozono
Minamigaoka	Express	Momozono
Tsu	part of Limited express (Nagoya—Ise) (Nagoya-bound in the morning) (Ise-bound in the evening)	Ise-Nakagawa

== History ==
Hisai Station opened on November 10, 1908 as a station on the Dai Nippon Kido's Ise Line, which was renamed the Chusei Railway in 1920. The Sangu Express Electric Railway's Tsu Line connected to the station on May 18, 1930. The Tsu Line was renamed the Nagoya Line on December 7, 1938. On March 15, 1941, the Sangu Express Electric Railway merged with Osaka Electric Railway to become a station on Kansai Express Railway's Nagoya Line. This line in turn was merged with the Nankai Electric Railway on June 1, 1944 to form Kintetsu. The Chusei Railway went out of business on December 1, 1942. The station was rebuilt in November 1997.

== Passenger statistics ==
In fiscal 2019, the station was used by an average of 5598 passengers daily (boarding passengers only).

== Surrounding area ==
- JGSDF Hisai Base
- Hisaishinmachi Post Office
- Mie Prefectural Hisai High School
- Mie Prefectural Hisai Norin High School

== See also ==
- List of railway stations in Japan
