= Minamigaoka Station =

Railway station in Tsu, Mie Prefecture, Japan

Minamigaoka Station 南が丘駅
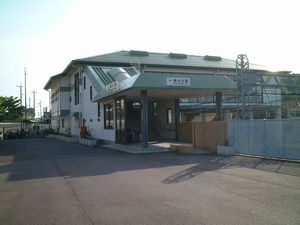
- Minamigaoka Station East Gate

General information
- Location: 994-6 Hisai Shinmachi, Tsu-shi, Mie-ken 514-0821; Japan
- Coordinates: 34.6924°N 136.4966°E
- Operator: Kintetsu Railway
- Line: Nagoya Line
- Distance: 71.5 km from Kintetsu Nagoya
- Platforms: 2 side platforms

Other information
- Station code: E41
- Website: Official website

History
- Opened: April 28, 1989

Passengers
- FY2019: 1931 daily
Location
- Location within Mie Prefecture Location within Japan

Minamigaoka Station (南が丘駅, Minamigaoka-eki) is a passenger railway station in located in the city of Tsu, Mie Prefecture, Japan, operated by the private railway operator Kintetsu Railway.

== Lines ==
Minamigaoka Station is served by the Nagoya Line, and is located 71.5 rail kilometers from the starting point of the line at Kintetsu Nagoya Station.

== Station layout ==
The station was consists of two opposed side platforms, connected by a footbridge.

=== Platforms ===
1	■ Nagoya Line	for Ise-Nakagawa, Osaka Namba, Kashikojima
2	■ Nagoya Line	for Tsu, Kintetsu Yokkaichi, Nagoya

== Adjacent stations ==
Only a small number of express trains stop at this station, and only during morning/evening commuting hours.

«	Service	»
Nagoya Line
Tsu-shimmachi	Express (急行)	Hisai
Tsu-shimmachi	Local (普通)	Hisai

== History ==
Minamigaoka Station was opened on April 28, 1989.

== Passenger statistics ==
In fiscal 2019, the station was used by an average of 1931 passengers daily (boarding passengers only).

== Surrounding area ==
- Minamigaoka residential area
- Tsu Minamigaoka Post Office
- Tsu City Minamigaoka Elementary School

== See also ==
- List of railway stations in Japan
