= Takada Junior College =

Coordinates: 34°46′12.9″N 136°30′34.7″E

- 高田短期大学
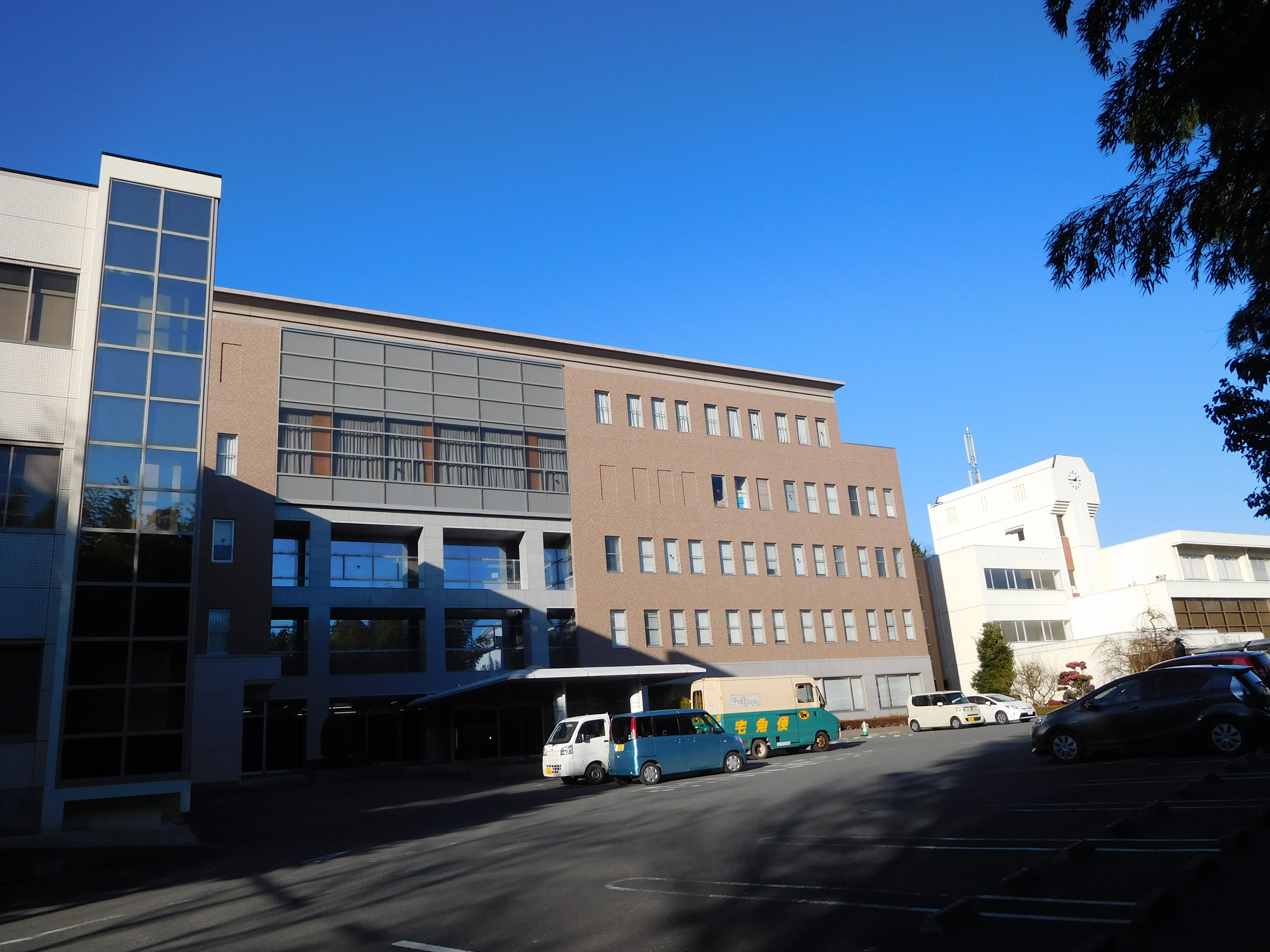
- Type: private
- Established: 1966
- Location: Tsu, Mie, Japan
- Website: www.takada-jc.ac.jp

Takada Junior College (高田短期大学, Takada Tanki Daigaku) is a private junior college in Tsu, Mie, Japan. It was established as a junior college in 1966. It became coeducational in April 1997.
