= Imuraya Confectionery =

Japanese food company

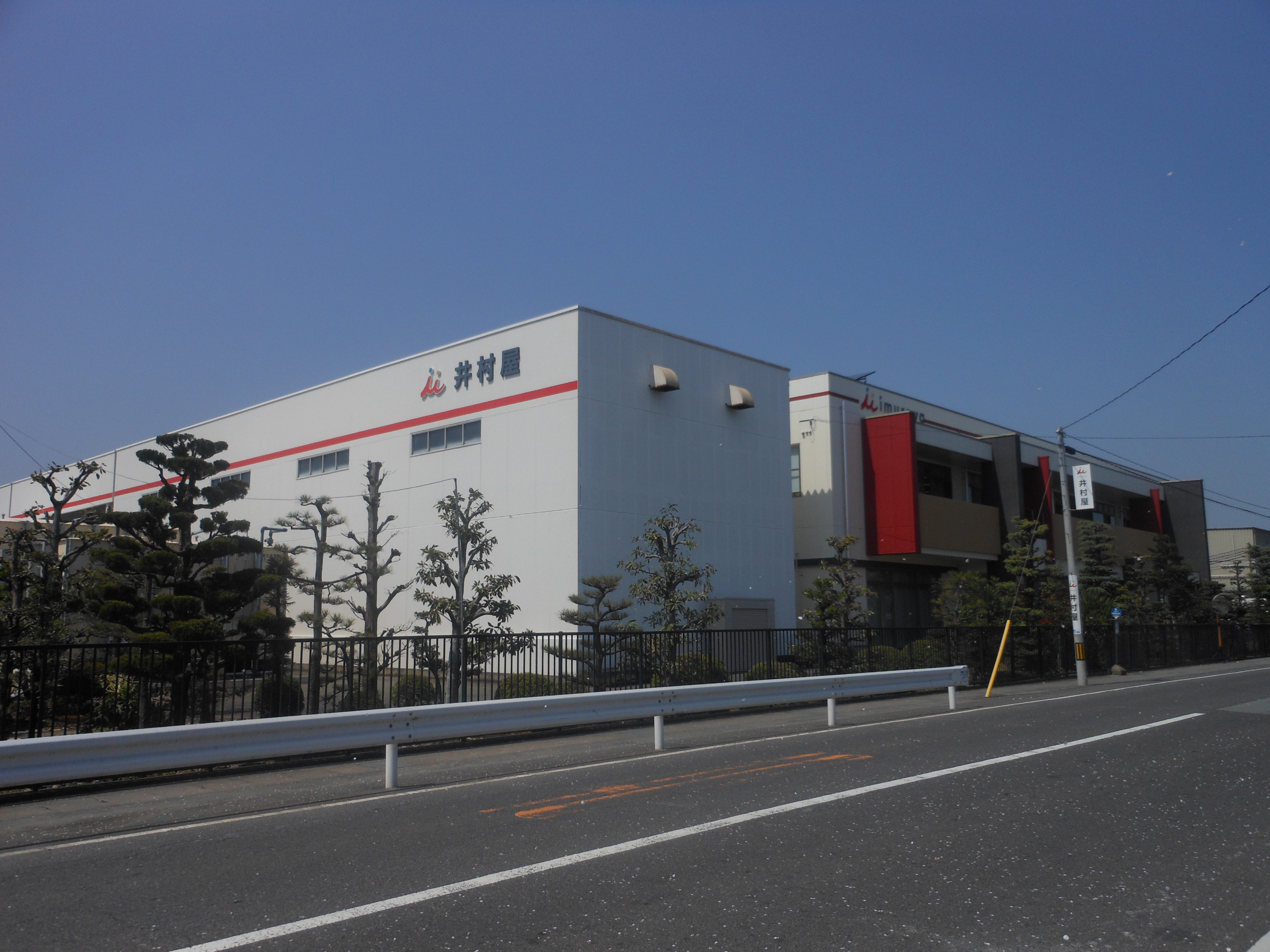
The head office of Imuraya Group in Tsu, Mie, Japan

Imuraya Confectionery Co., Ltd. (井村屋製菓株式会社, Imuraya Seika Kabushiki-Kaisha) (TYO: 2209) is a Japanese confectionery company selling azuki bean products. Its headquarters are in Tsu, Mie Prefecture. In March 2009 Imuraya announced that it would buy an 83.3% stake in LA/I.C and rename it Imuraya USA.

== Marketing ==
The brand has a product placement deal for the Yakuza games and its products have been available to buy in convenience stores on recent titles.
