= Karasu, Mie =

Dissolved municipality in Mie Prefecture, Japan

Karasu (香良洲町, Karasu-chō) was a town located in Ichishi District, Mie Prefecture, Japan.

As of 2003, the town had an estimated population of 5,281 and a density of 1,354.10 persons per km^{2}. The total area was 3.90 km^{2}.

On January 1, 2006, Karasu, along with the city of Hisai, the towns of Anō, Geinō and Kawage, the village of Misato (all from Age District), the towns of Hakusan and Ichishi, and the village of Misugi (all from Ichishi District), was merged into the expanded city of Tsu and thus no longer exists as an independent municipality.
