= Shimagahara, Mie =

Dissolved municipality in Mie prefecture, Japan

Shimagahara (島ヶ原村, Shimagahara-mura) was a village located in Ayama District, Mie Prefecture, Japan.

== Population ==
As of 2003, the village had an estimated population of 2,710 and a density of 118.08 persons per km^{2}. The total area was 22.95 km^{2}.

== History ==
On November 1, 2004, Shimagahara, along with the city of Ueno, the towns of Iga (former) and Ayama, the village of Ōyamada (all from Ayama District), and the town of Aoyama (from Naga District), was merged to create the city of Iga.
