= Hakusan, Mie =

Town in Mie Prefecture, Japan

Hakusan (白山町, Hakusan-chō) was a town located in Ichishi District, Mie Prefecture, Japan.

As of 2003, the town had an estimated population of 13,291 and a density of 118.82 persons per km^{2}. The total area was 111.86 km^{2}.

On January 1, 2006, Hakusan, along with the city of Hisai, the towns of Anō, Geinō and Kawage, the village of Misato (all from Age District), the towns of Ichishi and Karasu, and the village of Misugi (all from Ichishi District), was merged into the expanded city of Tsu and thus no longer exists as an independent municipality.
