= Ichishi District, Mie =

Former district in Mie prefecture, Japan

Ichishi (一志郡, Ichishi-gun) was a district located in Mie Prefecture, Japan.

As of 2003, the district had an estimated population of 70,117 and a density of 150.14 persons per km^{2}. The total area was 467.00 km^{2}.

Until the day before the dissolution on December 31, 2005, the district had 3 towns and a village.

- Hakusan (白山町)
- Ichishi (一志町)
- Karasu (香良洲町)
- Misugi (美杉村)

On January 1, 2006, the towns of Hakusan, Ichishi and Karasu, and the village of Misugi, along with the towns of Anō, Geinō and Kawage, and the village of Misato (all from Age District), and the city of Hisai, were merged into the expanded city of Tsu. Ichishi District was dissolved as a result of this merger.

== District Timeline ==
- June 1, 1891 - The village of Sada changed its name to Yamato.
- July 1, 1929 - The village of Yano was elevated to town status and changed its name to Karasu.
- April 1, 1931 - The village of Hon was merged into the town of Hisai.
- July 1, 1939 - The village of Takachaya was merged into the city of Tsu.
- November 3, 1940 - The villages of Ieki and Sakai were merged to create the town of Ieki.
- June 15, 1952 - The village of Unde was merged into the city of Tsu.
- October 15, 1954 - The villages of Asaka and Matsugasaki was merged into the city of Matsusaka.
- January 15, 1955 - The villages of Oi, Hase, Kawai and Takaoka were merged to create the town of Ichishi.
- March 1, 1955 - The municipalities of Hisai, Monou, Togi, Shikiri, Inaba and Sakakibara were merged to create the new town of Hisai.
- March 15, 1955:
  - The municipalities of Ieki, Omitsu, Kawaguchi, Yamato and Yatsuyama were merged to create the town of Hakusan.
  - The villages of Nakago, Toyochi, Nakagawa, Toyoda, Nakahara, and parts of Ukigo were merged to create the town of Ureshino. The remaining parts of Ukigo was merged into the city of Matsusaka.
  - The villages of Takahara, Yachi, Taronama, Iseji, Yawata, Taki and Shimonokawa were merged to create the village of Misugi.
- March 21, 1955 - The villages of Komenosho, Tenpaku, Tsuru and Onoe were merged to create the village of Mikumo.
- August 1, 1970 - The town of Hisai was elevated to city status.
- April 1, 1986 - The village of Mikumo was elevated to town status.
- January 1, 2005 - The towns of Ureshino and Mikumo, along with the towns of Iinan and Iitaka (both from Iinan District), were merged into the expanded city of Matsusaka.
- January 1, 2006 - The towns of Hakusan, Ichishi and Karasu, and the village of Misugi, along with the towns of Anō, Geinō and Kawage, and the village of Misato (all from Age District), and the city of Hisai, were merged into the expanded city of Tsu. Ichishi District was dissolved as a result of this merger.

== See also ==
- List of dissolved districts of Japan
