= Iga, Mie (town) =

Dissolved municipality in Mie prefecture, Japan

Iga (伊賀町, Iga-chō) was a town located in Ayama District, Mie Prefecture, Japan.

On November 1, 2004, Iga absorbed the city of Ueno, the town of Ayama, the villages of Ōyamada and Shimagahara (all from Ayama District), and the town of Aoyama (from Naga District) to create the city of Iga.

== Geography ==
Located on the northwestern Iga Valley. Tsuge River, the branch line of Kizu River, runs west.

== History ==
=== Timeline ===
- April 1, 1889 - Due to the municipal status enforcement, the villages of Higashitsuge, Nishitsuge, and Mibuno were born.
- July 1, 1942 - The village of Higashitsuge was elevated to town status to become the town of town of Tsuge.
- January 1, 1955 - The villages of Nishitsuge and Mibuno were merged to create the village of Kasuga.
- March 20, 1959 - The town of Tsuge, and the village of Kasuga were merged to create the town of Iga.
- November 1, 2004 - Iga absorbed the old city of Ueno, the town of Ayama, the villages of Ōyamada and Shimagahara (all from Ayama District), and the town of Aoyama (from Naga District) to create the city of Iga.

== Traffic ==
=== Railroad ===
- West Japan Railway Company (JR West) Kansai Main Line Tsuge Station, Shindō Station

=== Roads ===
- Meihan National Highway Iga IC, Kamitsuge IC, Shimotsuge IC, Midai IC, Mibuno IC
- Japan National Route 25
