= Geinō, Mie =

Dissolved municipality in Mie prefecture, Japan

Geinō (芸濃町, Geinō-chō) was a town located in Age District, Mie Prefecture, Japan.

== Population ==
As of 2003, the town had an estimated population of 8,644 and a density of 133.87 persons per km^{2}. The total area wa 64.57 km^{2}.

== History ==
On January 1, 2006, Geinō, along with the city of Hisai, the towns of Anō and Kawage, the village of Misato (all from Age District), the towns of Hakusan, Ichishi and Karasu, and the village of Misugi (all from Ichishi District), was merged into the expanded city of Tsu and thus no longer exists as an independent municipality.
