= Misato, Mie =

Dissolved municipality in Mie prefecture, Japan

Misato (美里村, Misato-mura) was a village located in Age District, Mie Prefecture, Japan.

As of 2003, the village had an estimated population of 4,164 and a density of 82.77 persons per km^{2}. The total area was 50.31 km^{2}.

On January 1, 2006, Misato, along with the city of Hisai, the towns of Anō, Geinō and Kawage (all from Age District), the towns of Hakusan, Ichishi and Karasu, and the village of Misugi (all from Ichishi District), was merged into the expanded city of Tsu and thus no longer exists as an independent municipality.
