= Kawage, Mie =

Dissolved municipality in Age district, Mie prefecture, Japan

Kawage (河芸町, Kawage-chō) was a town located in Age District, Mie Prefecture, Japan.

As of 2003, the town had an estimated population of 17,948 and a density of 955.19 persons per km^{2}. The total area was 18.79 km^{2}.

On January 1, 2006, Kawage, along with the city of Hisai, the towns of Anō and Geinō, the village of Misato (all from Age District), the towns of Hakusan, Ichishi and Karasu, and the village of Misugi (all from Ichishi District), was merged into the expanded city of Tsu and thus no longer exists as an independent municipality.
