= Tsu, Mie =

Tsu 津市
- Prefecture capital and City
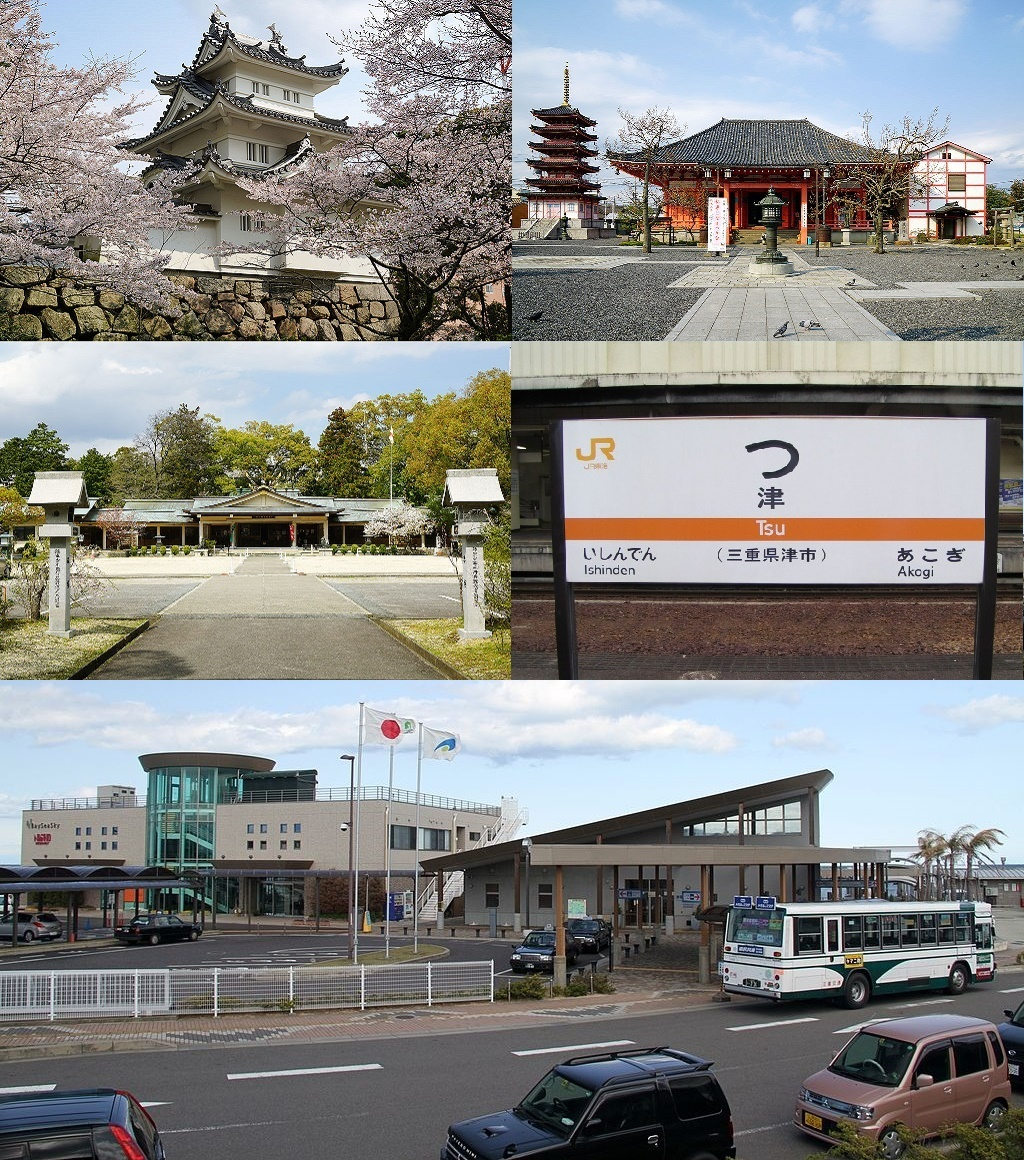
Tsu Castle	Tsu Kannon
Mie Gokoku Jinja	Tsu Station sign
Tsu Nagisamachi
- Flag Seal
- Location of Tsu in Mie Prefecture

- Coordinates: 34°43′59″N 136°30′48″E
- Country: Japan
- Region: Kansai (Tōkai)
- Prefecture: Mie

Government
  - Mayor: Yasuyuki Maeba (since 2011)

Area
  - Total: 711.11 km^{2} (274.56 sq mi)

Population (October 1, 2025 census (preliminary))
  - Total: 263,923
  - Density: 371.14/km^{2} (961.25/sq mi)
- Time zone: UTC+9 (Japan Standard Time)
- Symbols
  - Tree: Zelkova serrata
  - Flower: Azalea
  - Bird: Japanese bush warbler
- Phone number: 059-229-3110
- Address: 23-1 Nishi-Marunouchi, Tsu-shi, Mie-ken 514-8611
- Website: Official website

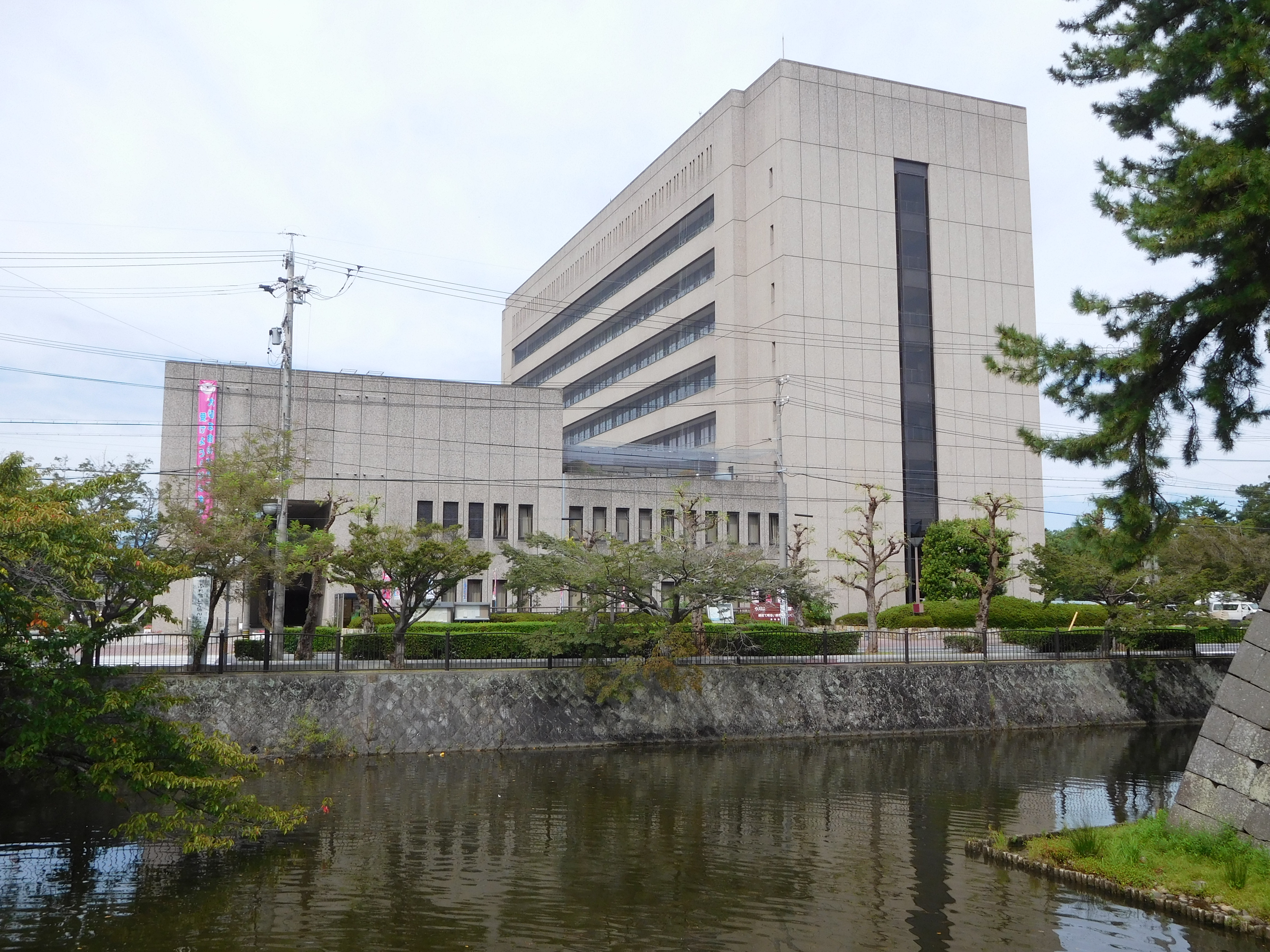
Tsu City Hall

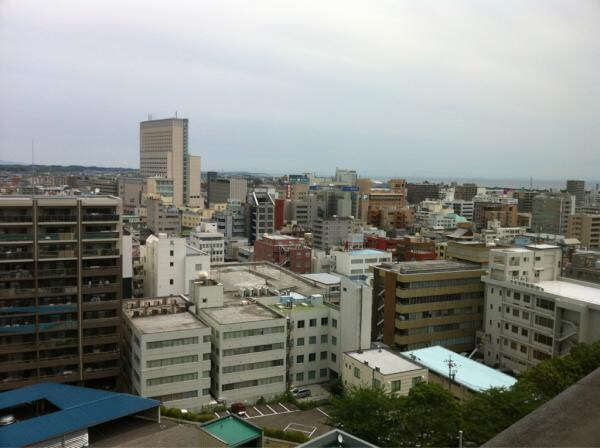
Skyline of Tsu City

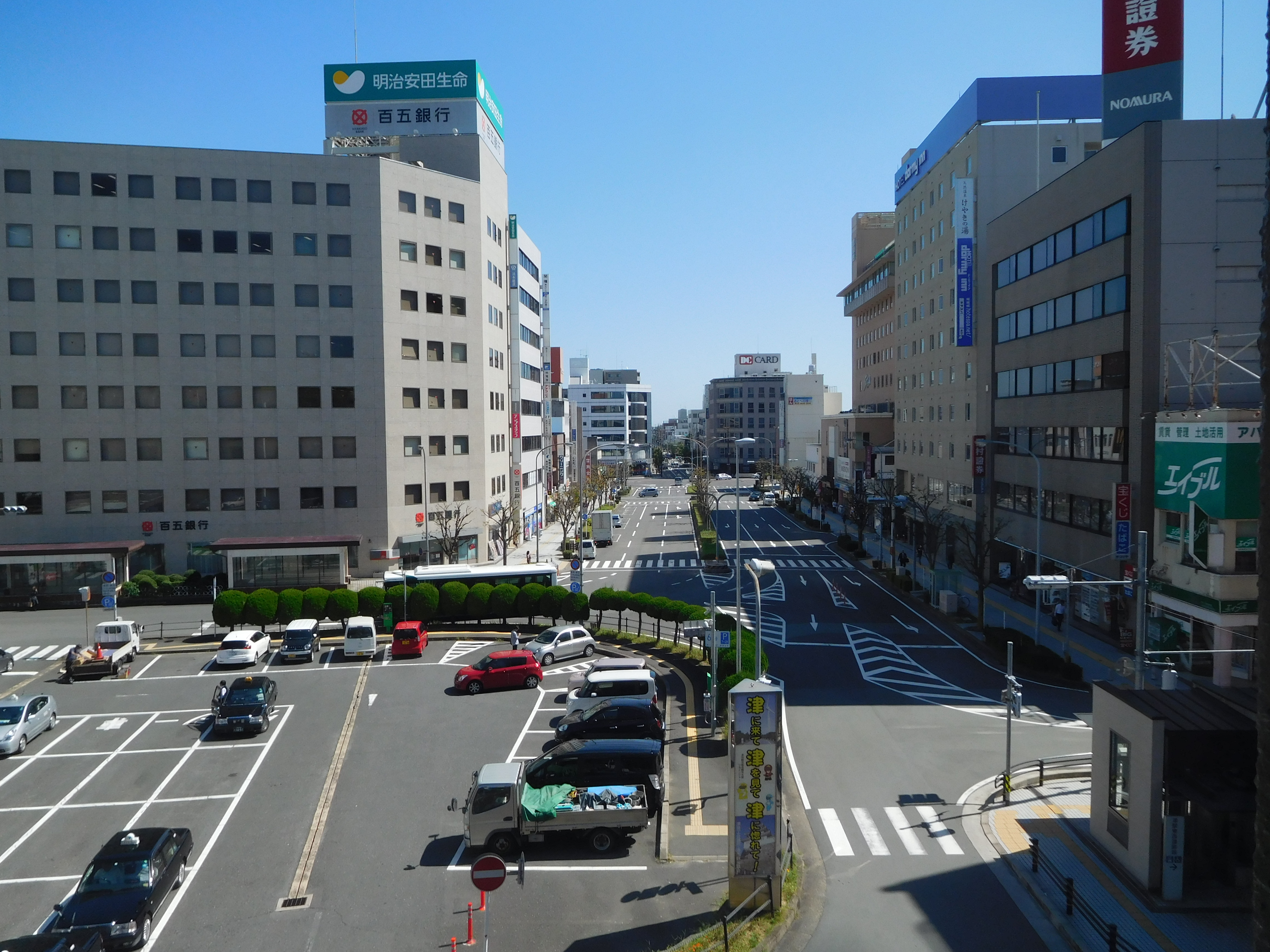
Downtown of Tsu City

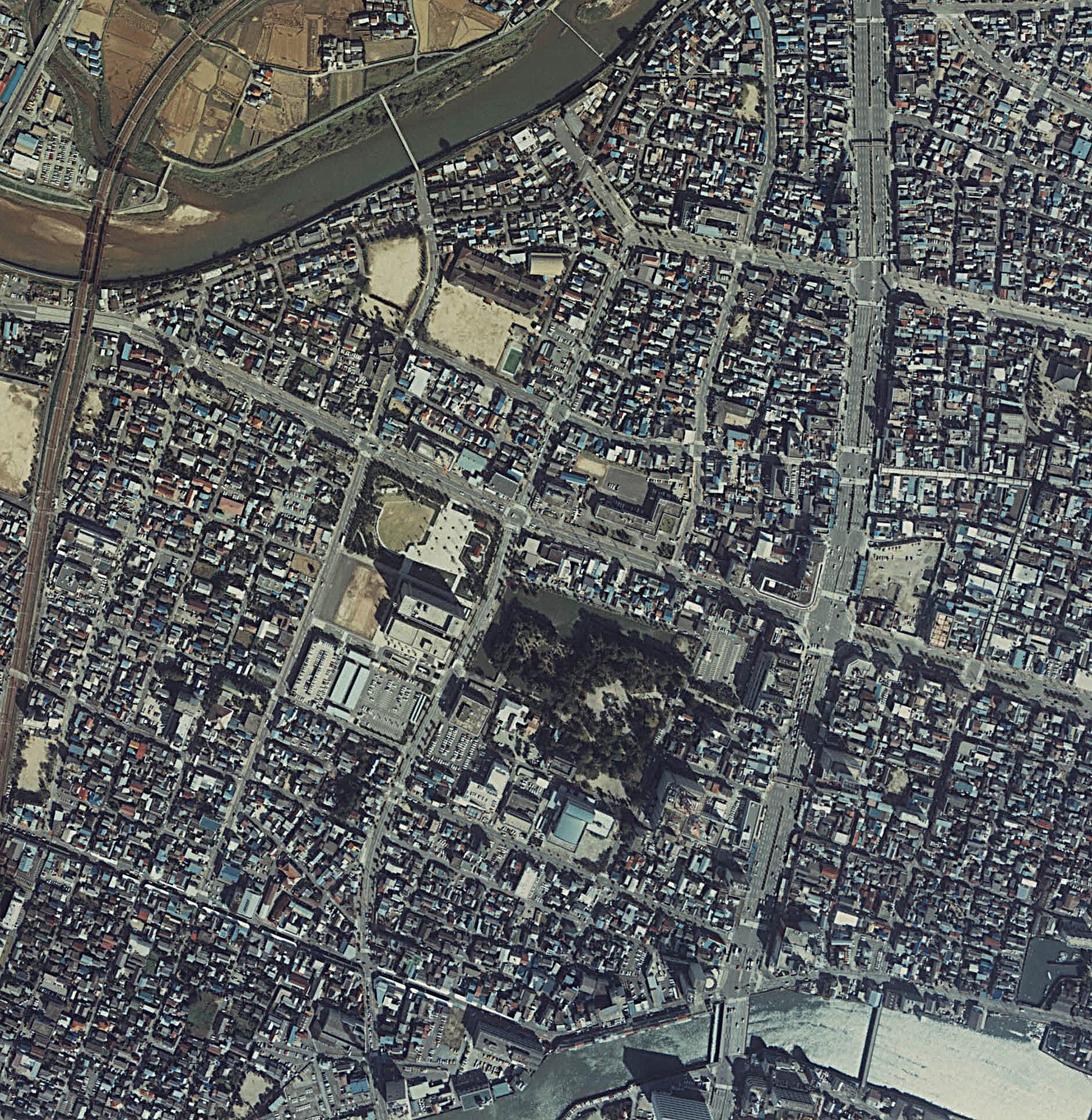
Tsu Castle from the air

Tsu (津市, Tsu-shi; Japanese pronunciation: [t͡sɨ́(.ɕì)]) is the capital city of Mie Prefecture, Japan. According to preliminary results of the 2025 census, the city had a population of 263,923 in 118,506 households. The total area of the city is 711.11 square kilometres (274.56 sq mi). Although it is the second-largest city in the prefecture by population, behind Yokkaichi, it is the administrative and educational center of Mie Prefecture. That role comes from its status as the prefectural capital and its concentration of national government offices and educational institutions.

== Geography ==
Tsu is in the east-central Kii Peninsula, in central Mie Prefecture. It is the largest city in Mie Prefecture by area and stretches across the width of the prefecture, from Ise Bay on the Pacific Ocean in the east to Nara Prefecture in the west. Parts of the city are within the Murō-Akame-Aoyama Quasi-National Park.

=== Neighboring municipalities ===
- Iga, to the west
- Kameyama, to the north
- Matsusaka, to the south
- Nabari, to the west
- Mitsue, Nara, to the west
- Soni, Nara, to the west
- Suzuka, to the north

== Climate ==
Tsu has a humid subtropical climate (Köppen Cfa) with hot summers and cool winters with little or no snowfall. Based on the 1991–2020 normals, the average annual temperature is 16.3 °C (61.3 °F) and the average annual precipitation is 1,612.9 mm (63.50 in), with September the wettest month. August is the warmest month, averaging 27.9 °C (82.2 °F), and January is the coldest, averaging 5.7 °C (42.3 °F).

Climate data for Tsu (1991−2020 normals, extremes 1889−present)
Month	Jan	Feb	Mar	Apr	May	Jun	Jul	Aug	Sep	Oct	Nov	Dec	Year
Record high °C (°F)	19.0 (66.2)	22.8 (73.0)	25.9 (78.6)	31.0 (87.8)	33.9 (93.0)	36.7 (98.1)	39.4 (102.9)	39.5 (103.1)	37.7 (99.9)	32.2 (90.0)	27.2 (81.0)	23.7 (74.7)	39.5 (103.1)
Mean maximum °C (°F)	14.4 (57.9)	16.3 (61.3)	20.2 (68.4)	25.8 (78.4)	29.9 (85.8)	32.7 (90.9)	36.0 (96.8)	36.5 (97.7)	33.1 (91.6)	28.2 (82.8)	22.4 (72.3)	17.5 (63.5)	37.1 (98.8)
Mean daily maximum °C (°F)	9.5 (49.1)	10.0 (50.0)	13.4 (56.1)	18.6 (65.5)	23.1 (73.6)	26.2 (79.2)	30.4 (86.7)	31.6 (88.9)	28.0 (82.4)	22.6 (72.7)	17.1 (62.8)	12.0 (53.6)	20.2 (68.4)
Daily mean °C (°F)	5.7 (42.3)	5.9 (42.6)	9.0 (48.2)	14.2 (57.6)	19.0 (66.2)	22.7 (72.9)	26.8 (80.2)	27.9 (82.2)	24.4 (75.9)	18.8 (65.8)	13.2 (55.8)	8.1 (46.6)	16.3 (61.3)
Mean daily minimum °C (°F)	2.4 (36.3)	2.4 (36.3)	5.2 (41.4)	10.2 (50.4)	15.4 (59.7)	19.7 (67.5)	24.0 (75.2)	25.0 (77.0)	21.4 (70.5)	15.5 (59.9)	9.5 (49.1)	4.6 (40.3)	12.9 (55.2)
Mean minimum °C (°F)	−1.4 (29.5)	−1.2 (29.8)	0.5 (32.9)	3.9 (39.0)	10.5 (50.9)	15.6 (60.1)	20.3 (68.5)	21.3 (70.3)	16.5 (61.7)	10.0 (50.0)	4.2 (39.6)	0.3 (32.5)	−1.8 (28.8)
Record low °C (°F)	−7.8 (18.0)	−7.0 (19.4)	−5.6 (21.9)	−3.0 (26.6)	3.0 (37.4)	9.0 (48.2)	14.6 (58.3)	14.6 (58.3)	8.7 (47.7)	2.3 (36.1)	−1.4 (29.5)	−6.4 (20.5)	−7.8 (18.0)
Average precipitation mm (inches)	48.5 (1.91)	57.1 (2.25)	104.5 (4.11)	129.0 (5.08)	167.3 (6.59)	201.8 (7.94)	173.9 (6.85)	144.5 (5.69)	276.6 (10.89)	186.1 (7.33)	76.4 (3.01)	47.2 (1.86)	1,612.9 (63.50)
Average snowfall cm (inches)	2 (0.8)	3 (1.2)	0 (0)	0 (0)	0 (0)	0 (0)	0 (0)	0 (0)	0 (0)	0 (0)	0 (0)	1 (0.4)	6 (2.4)
Average precipitation days (≥ 0.5 mm)	6.4	7.5	10.5	9.8	10.9	12.8	12.3	9.8	12.3	10.1	6.8	6.5	115.7
Average relative humidity (%)	61	61	62	64	68	74	75	73	72	69	65	63	67
Mean monthly sunshine hours	162.9	156.2	186.1	192.7	197.8	146.9	180.2	220.7	165.3	164.5	163.7	171.5	2,108.6
Source: Japan Meteorological Agency

== Demographics ==
Per Japanese census data, the population of Tsu has been relatively stable over the past several decades.

Historical population
Year	Pop.	±%
1960	226,065	—
1970	242,000	+7.0%
1980	265,443	+9.7%
1990	280,384	+5.6%
2000	286,521	+2.2%
2010	285,728	−0.3%

== History ==
=== Origin ===
Tsu originally developed as a port town known as Anotsu (安濃津) in the Nara and Heian periods. In 1498 the port was devastated by the earthquakes and tsunami of the Meiō era, including the 1498 Meiō Nankaidō earthquake, and its residents were forced to relocate.

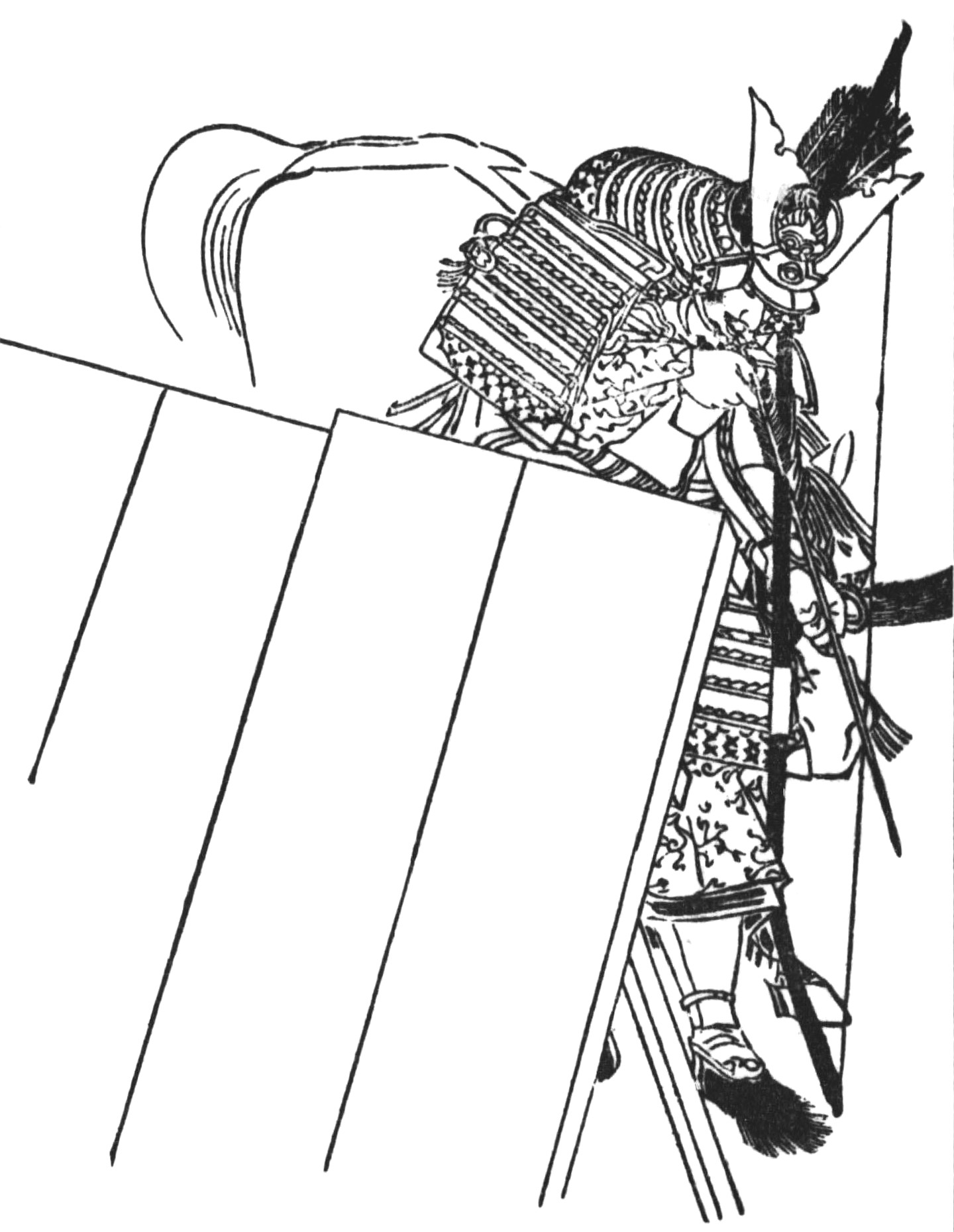
Kitabatake Akiyoshi

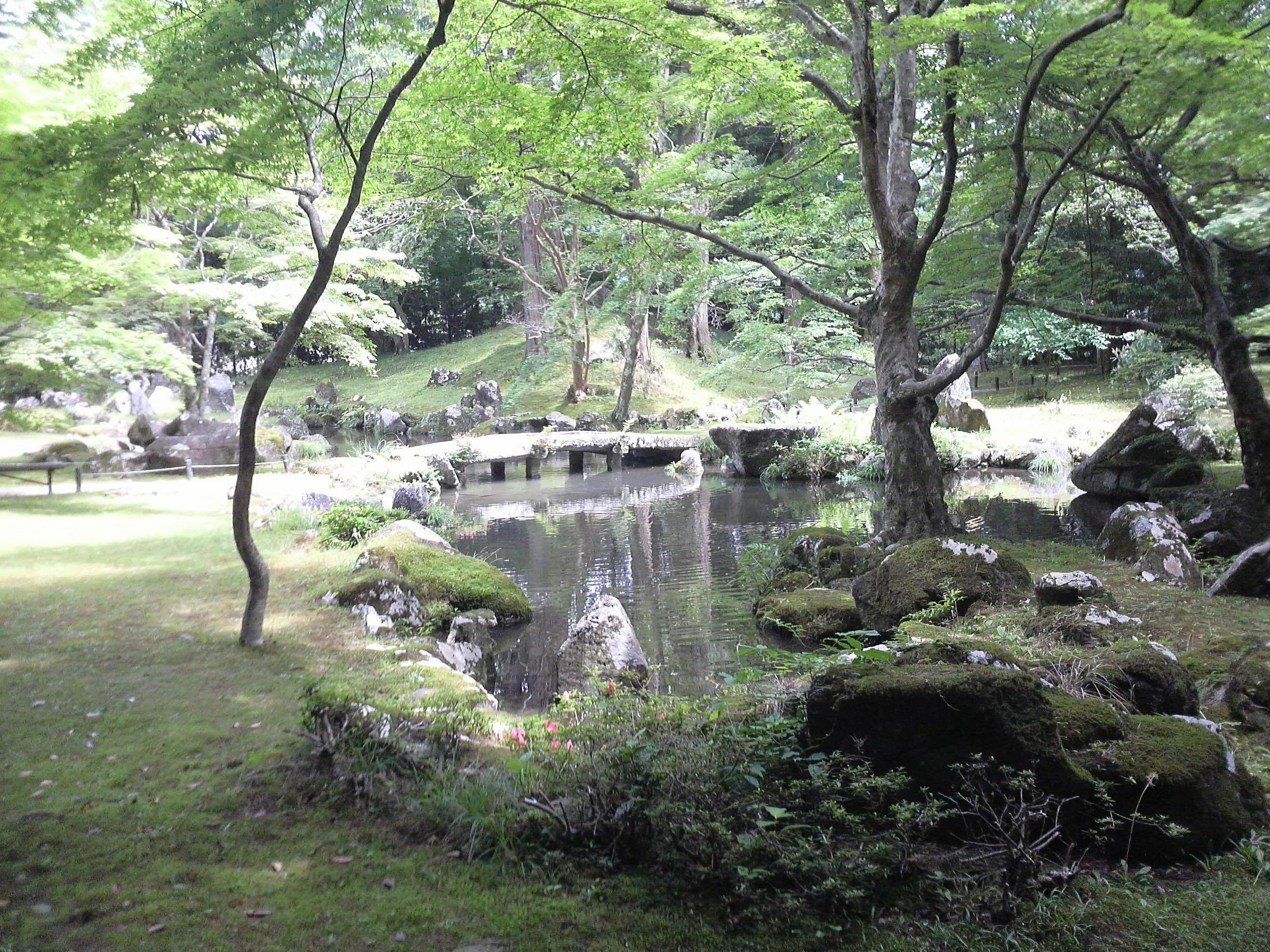
Kitabatake Family Residence Gardens (Kitabatake Shrine)

=== Edo period ===
The town was rebuilt as a castle town and a post station by the Tōdō clan, daimyō of Tsu Domain under the Tokugawa shogunate. During the Edo period, it became a popular stopping point for travelers to Ise Grand Shrine, about 40 km to the southeast.

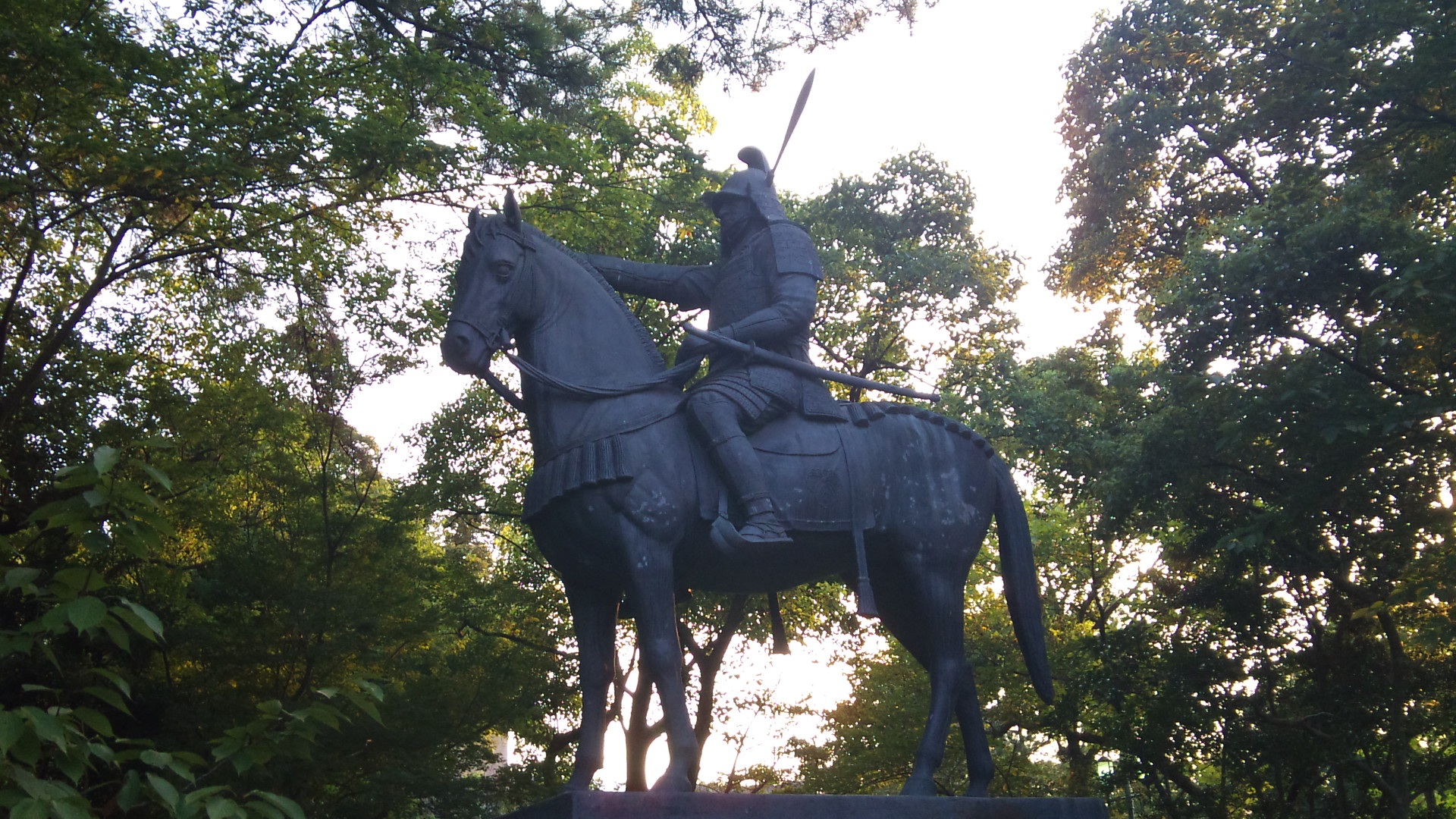
Tōdō Takatora

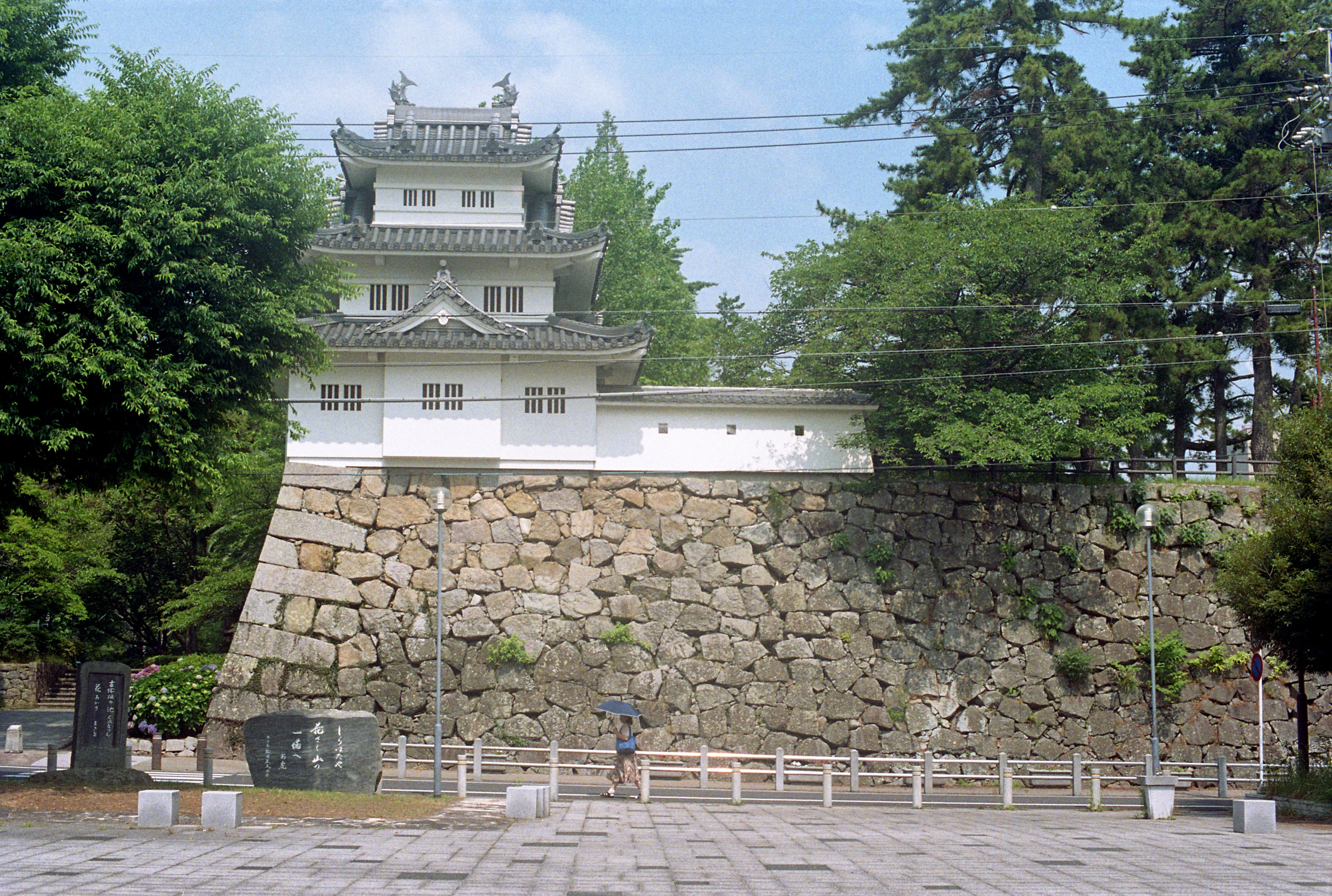
Tsu Castle

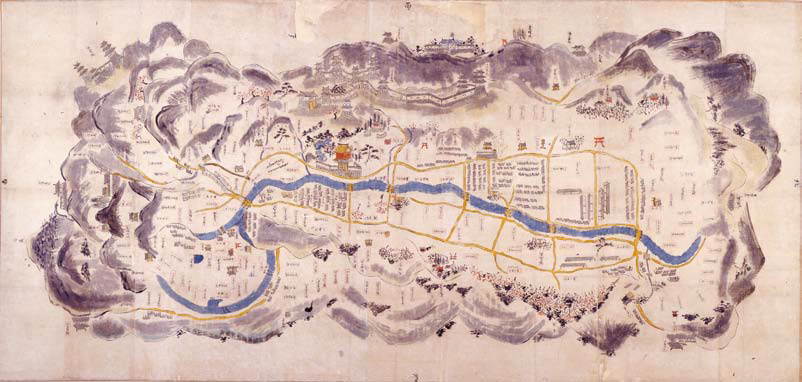
Map of Tage Castle (Kiriyama Castle) in the Edo period

=== Modern Tsu ===
Following the Meiji Restoration, Tsu became the capital of Mie Prefecture. When the modern municipal system was established on April 1, 1889, Tsu was one of the original 31 cities proclaimed in Japan, and the only one in Mie Prefecture. The city gradually expanded by annexing neighboring villages: Tatebe and Tōse in 1909, Shinmachi in 1934, Fujimi in 1936, Takachaya in 1939, and Kanbe, Anto and Kushigata in 1943.

The first bombs fell on Tsu on March 12, 1945. Between June and July 1945, central Tsu was hit by three heavy air raids, and about 73 percent of the city center was destroyed by incendiary bombs. The worst raid, by about 70 B-29 bombers on July 24, 1945, killed an estimated 1,200 to 1,300 people.

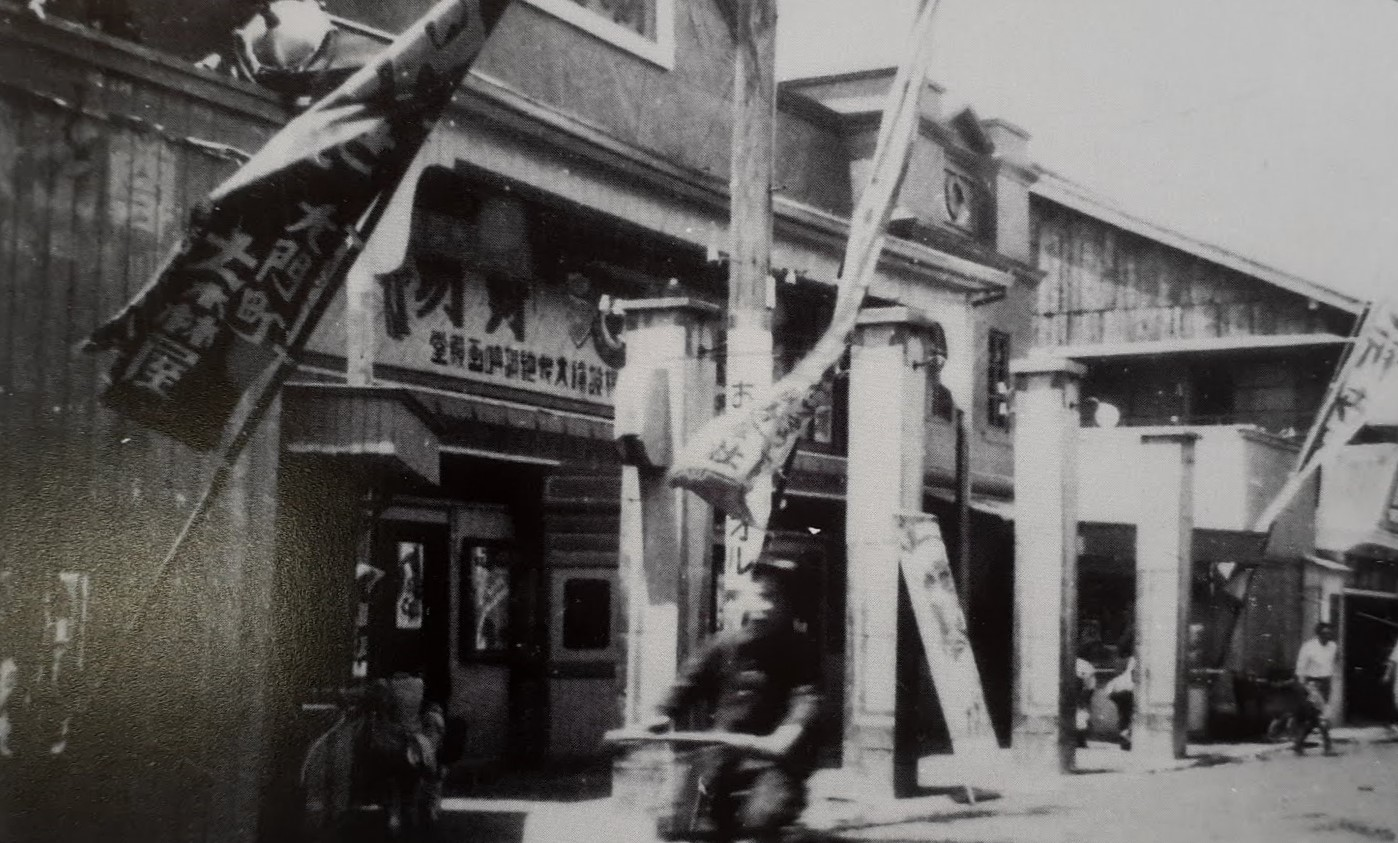
Tsu Shinsekai before 1945

On January 1, 2006, Tsu merged with the neighboring city of Hisai, the towns of Anō, Geinō and Kawage, and the village of Misato (all in Age District), and the towns of Hakusan, Ichishi and Karasu, and the village of Misugi (all in Ichishi District), forming the new city of Tsu. As a result, it became the largest city in Mie by area, ahead of Matsusaka.

== Government ==
Tsu has a mayor-council form of government with a directly elected mayor and a unicameral city council. As of 2026, the mayor is Yasuyuki Maeba, who was first elected in 2011 and is serving his fourth term. In national politics, the city is part of the Mie 1st district of the House of Representatives of the National Diet.

== Economy ==
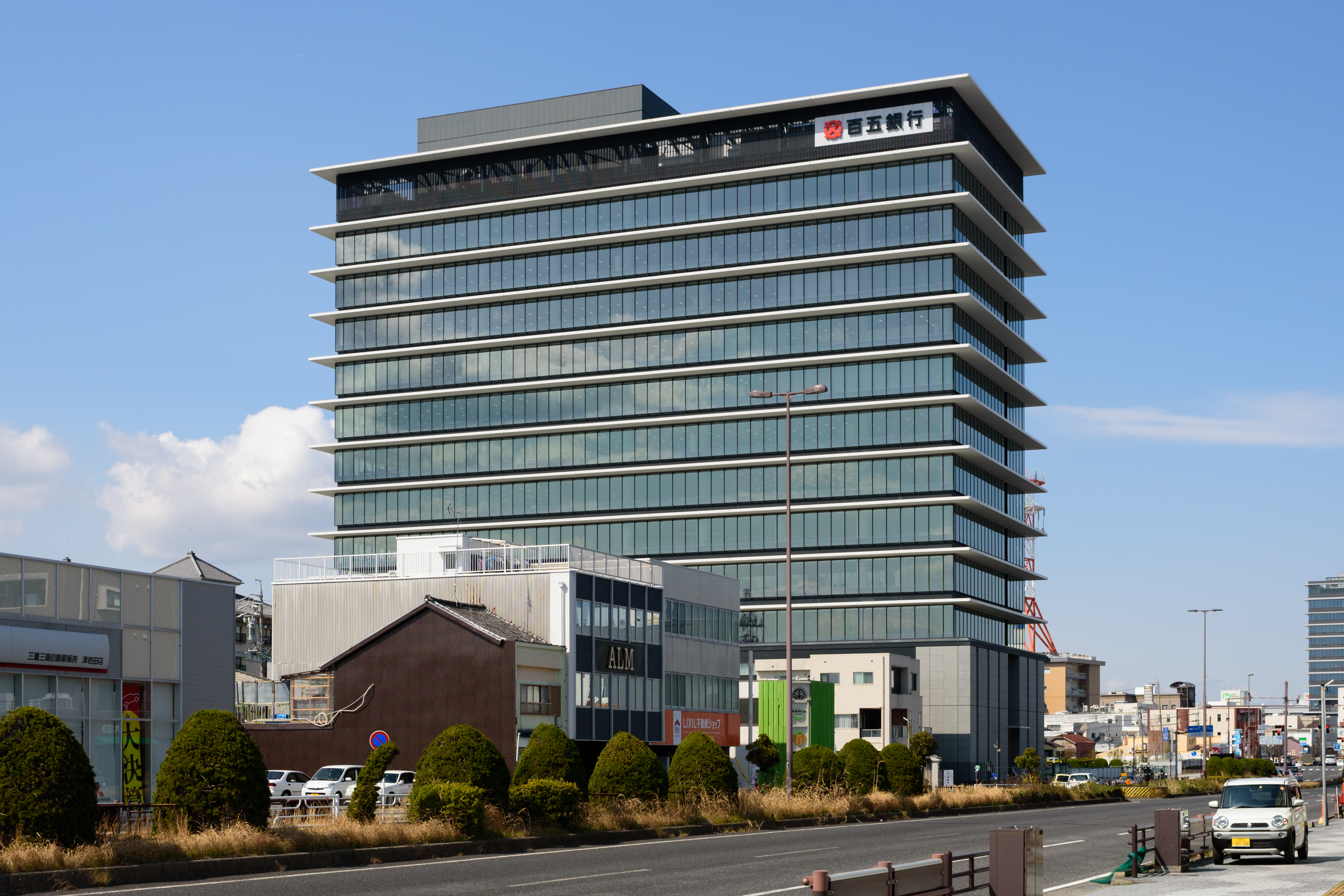
Hyakugo Bank

Imuraya Confectionery, a confectionery company, and ZTV, a cable television operator, are headquartered in Tsu.

== Education ==
=== Colleges and universities ===
- Mie Prefectural College of Nursing
- Mie University, the prefecture's only national university
- Takada Junior College
- Tsu City College

=== Primary and secondary education ===
Tsu has 48 public elementary schools and 19 public middle schools operated by the city government, one elementary school and one middle school affiliated with Mie University, two private middle schools, and one combined elementary and junior high school.

== Transportation ==
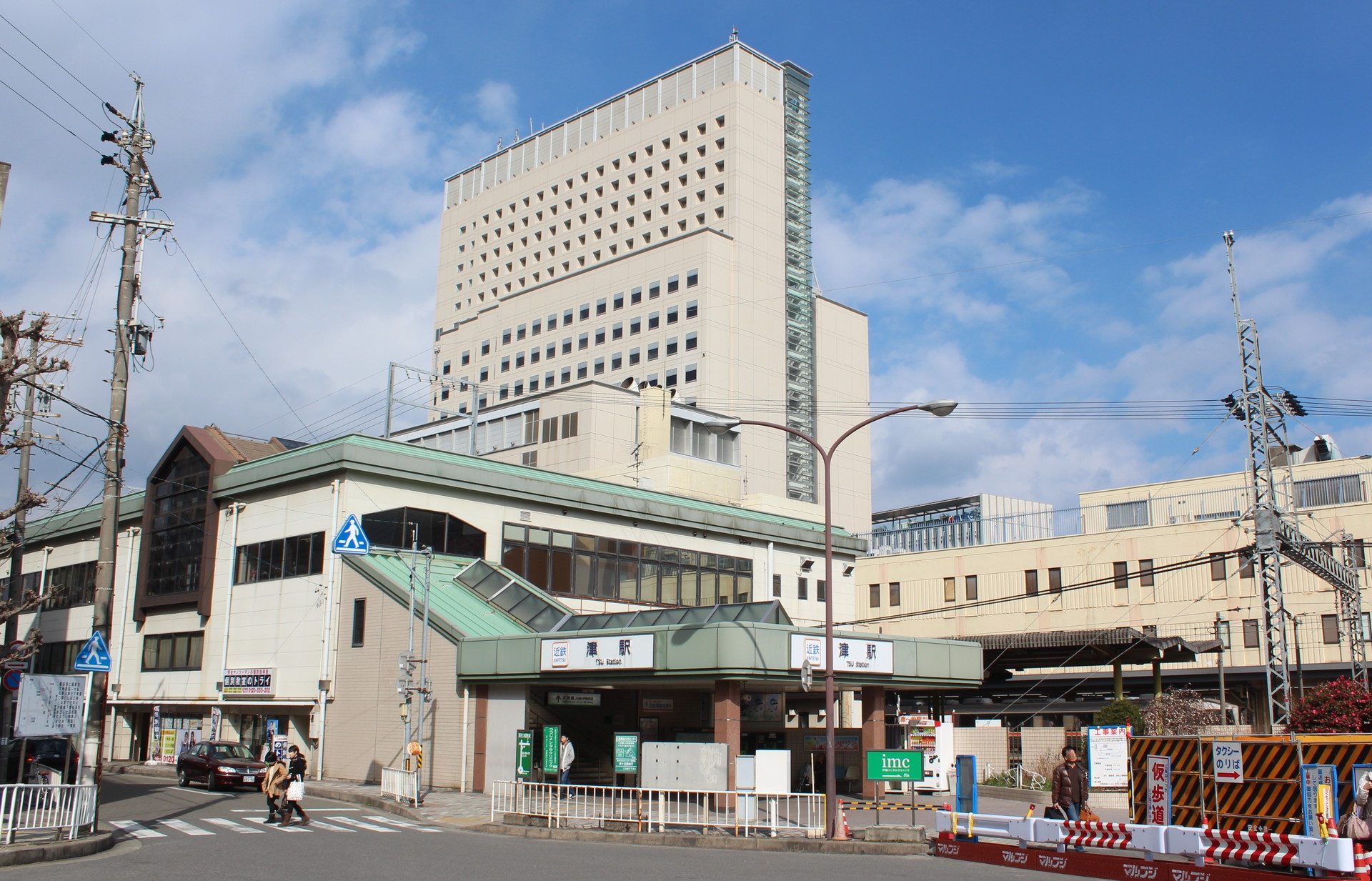
Tsu Station

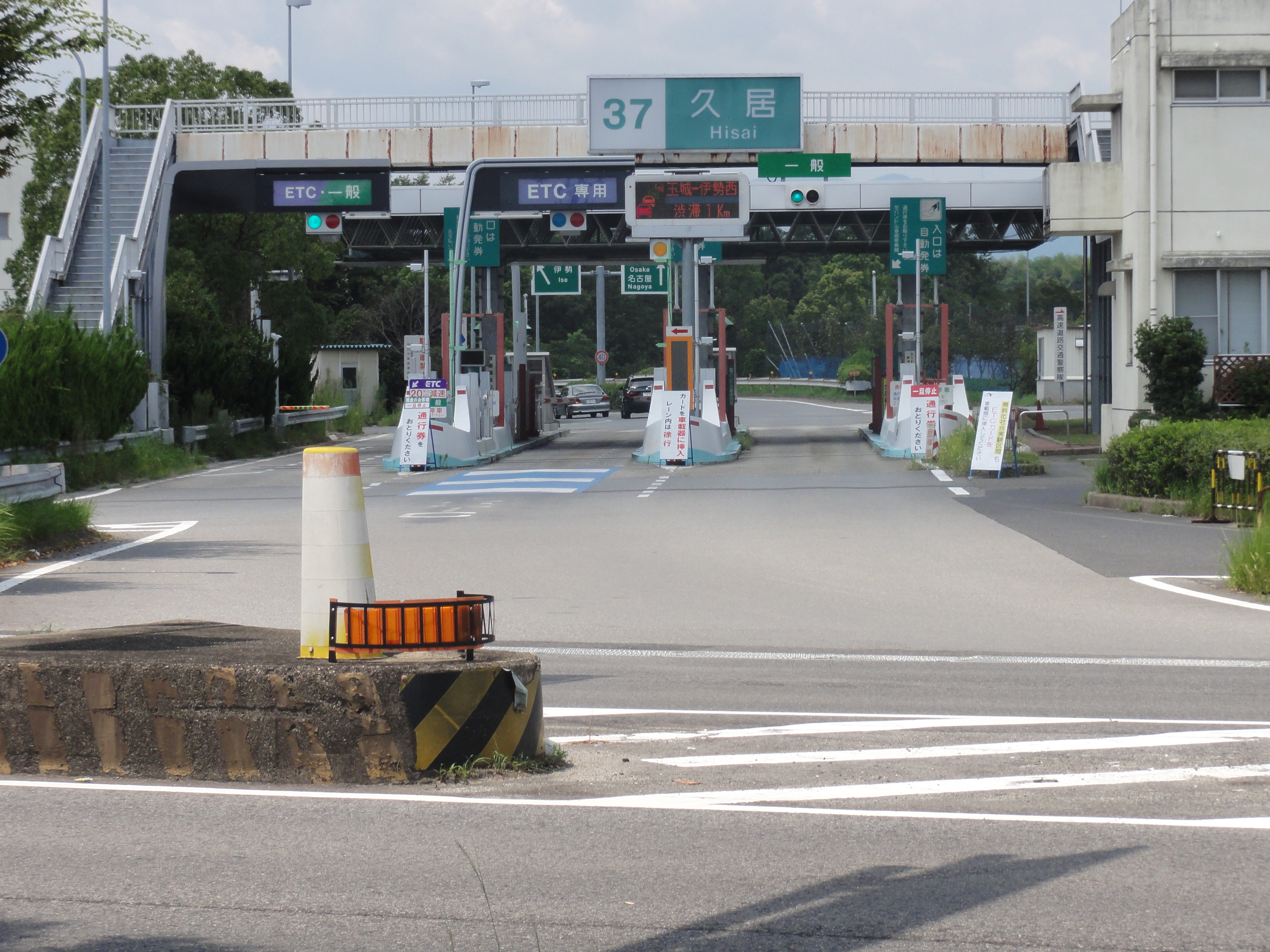
Hisai Interchange

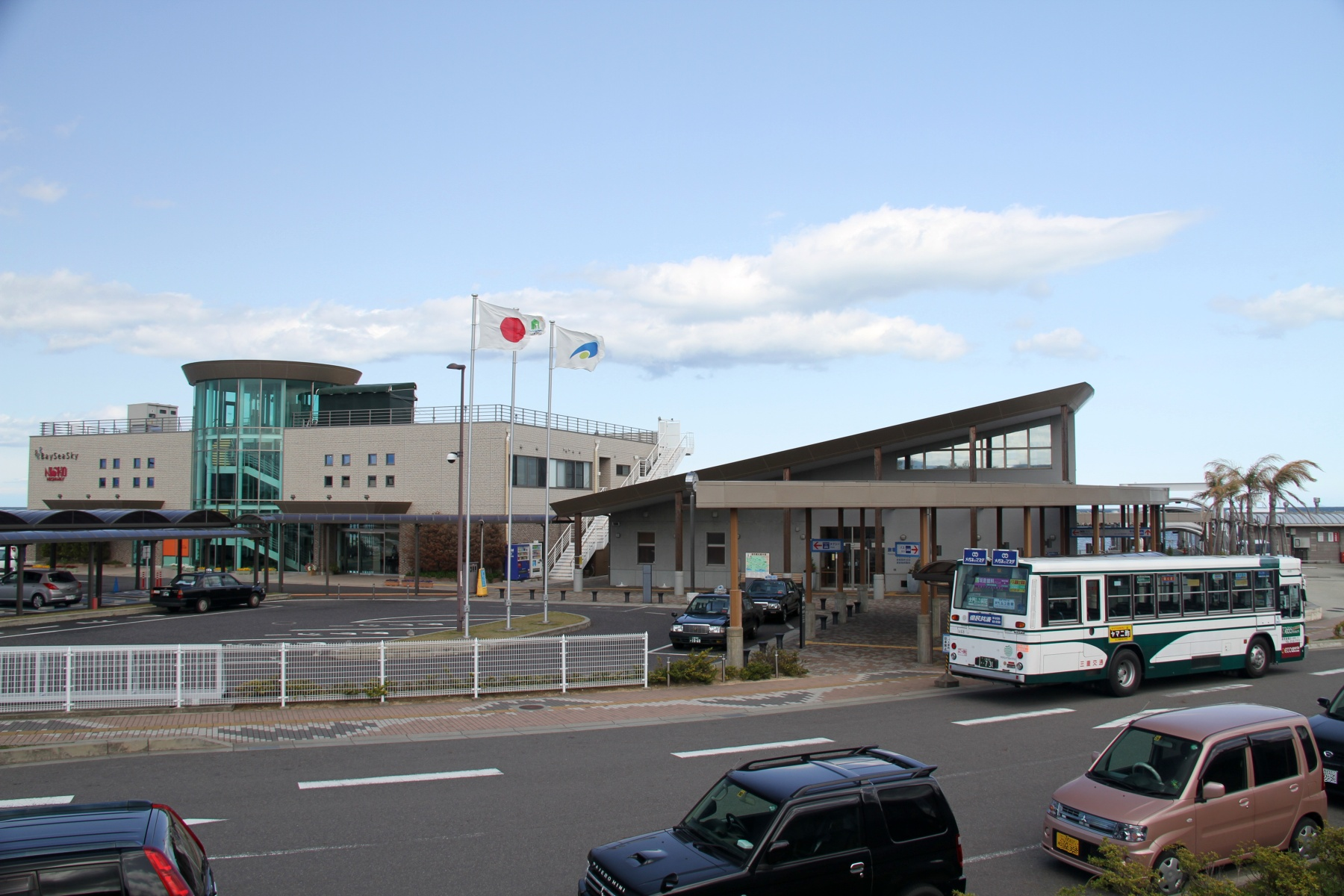
Port of Tsu-Matsusaka

=== Railway ===
JR Tōkai – Kisei Main Line

- Ishinden - Tsu - Akogi - Takachaya

JR Tōkai – Meishō Line

- Ise-Hata - Ichishi - Isegi - Ise-Ōi - Ise-Kawaguchi - Sekinomiya - Ieki - Ise-Takehara - Ise-Kamakura - Ise-Yachi - Hitsu - Ise-Okitsu

Kintetsu Railway – Nagoya Line

- Chisato - Toyotsu-Ueno - Shiratsuka - Takadahonzan - Edobashi - Tsu - Tsu-shimmachi - Minamigaoka - Hisai - Momozono

Kintetsu Railway – Osaka Line

- Higashi-Aoyama - Sakakibara-Onsenguchi - Ōmitsu - Ise-Ishibashi - Kawai-Takaoka

Ise Railway – Ise Railway Ise Line

- Ise-Ueno - Kawage - Higashi-Ishinden - Tsu

=== Highway ===
==== Expressway ====
- Ise Expressway

==== Japan National Route ====
- National Route 23
- National Route 163
- National Route 165
- National Route 306
- National Route 368
- National Route 369
- National Route 422

=== Sea ports ===
- Port of Tsu-Matsusaka

== Sister cities ==
- (Japan) Higashishirakawa, Gifu, since June 28, 1989
- Osasco, São Paulo, Brazil, since October 18, 1976
- Zhenjiang, Jiangsu, China, since June 11, 1984

== Local attractions ==
Tsu is known for the Tōjin Odori (唐人踊り), a dance from the Wakebe-chō neighborhood that is performed at the annual Tsu Festival in October. It began around 1636 as part of the festival of Tsu Hachiman Shrine and imitates the Joseon Tongsinsa, the Korean diplomatic missions to Edo-period Japan. Similar dances derived from the Joseon missions survive in Suzuka and in Ushimado, Setouchi, Okayama Prefecture.

The ruins of Tsu Castle have been made into a downtown park. Kitabatake Shrine and Yūki Shrine are notable local Shinto shrines.

== Culture ==
=== Sports ===
==== Baseball ====
- Mie Takatora baseball club (JABA)

==== Volleyball ====
- Veertien Mie (V.League)
