= Ōyamada, Mie =

Dissolved municipality in Ayama district, Mie prefecture, Japan

Ōyamada (大山田村, Ōyamada-mura) was a village located in Ayama District, Mie Prefecture, Japan.

As of 2003, the village had an estimated population of 5,819 and a density of 60.63 persons per km^{2}. The total area was 95.98 km^{2}.

On November 1, 2004, Ōyamada, along with the city of Ueno, the towns of Iga (former) and Ayama, the village of Shimagahara (all from Ayama District), and the town of Aoyama (from Naga District), was merged to create the city of Iga.
