= Hisai, Mie =

Former city located in Tsu

Hisai (久居市, Hisai-shi) was a city located in Mie, Japan. The city was founded on August 1, 1970.

As of 2003, the city had an estimated population of 41,669 and the density of 610.98 persons per km^{2}. The total area was 68.20 km^{2}.

On January 1, 2006, Hisai, along with the towns of Anō, Geinō and Kawage, the village of Misato (all from Age District), the towns of Hakusan, Ichishi and Karasu, and the village of Misugi (all from Ichishi District), was merged into the expanded city of Tsu and thus no longer exists as an independent municipality.

Since 1999 Hisai City has been operating 4 wind turbines with a total capacity of 3 MW which amounts to about 16% of the city's power demand.
