= Age District, Mie =

District of Mie Prefecture, Japan

Age District 安芸郡 (Age-gun) was a district located in Mie Prefecture, Japan.

As of 2003, the district had an estimated population of 41,976. The total area was 170.60 km^{2} (65.87 sq mi). Until the dissolution on December 31, 2005, the district had three towns and a village.

- Anō (安濃町)
- Geinō (芸濃町)
- Kawage (河芸町)
- Misato (美里村)

On January 1, 2006, the towns of Anō, Geinō and Kawage, and the village of Misato, along with the towns of Hakusan, Ichishi and Karasu, and the village of Misugi (all from Ichishi District), and the city of Hisai, were merged into the expanded city of Tsu. Age District dissolved as a result of this merger.

== District Timeline ==
- September 30, 1956 - Age District was formed by the mergers of Kawage and Anō Districts. (2 towns, 4 villages)
- January 1, 1957 - The villages of Osato and Takanoo were merged to create the village of Toyosato. (2 towns, 3 villages)
- February 1, 1973 - The village of Toyosato was merged into the city of Tsu. (2 towns, 2 villages)
- January 15, 1977 - The village of Anō was elevated town status to become the town of Anō. (3 towns, 1 village)
- January 1, 2006 - The towns of Anō, Geinō and Kawage, and the village of Misato, along with the towns of Hakusan, Ichishi and Karasu, and the village of Misugi (all from Ichishi District), and the city of Hisai, were merged into the expanded city of Tsu. Age District dissolved as a result of this merger.

== See also ==
- List of dissolved districts of Japan
