= Anō, Mie =

Dissolved municipality in Mie prefecture, Japan

Anō (安濃町, Anō-chō) was a town located in Age District, Mie Prefecture, Japan.

As of 2003, the town had an estimated population of 11,220 and a density of 303.82 persons per km^{2}. The total area was 36.93 km^{2}.

On January 1, 2006, Anō, along with the city of Hisai, the towns of Geinō and Kawage, the village of Misato (all from Age District), the towns of Hakusan, Ichishi and Karasu, and the village of Misugi (all from Ichishi District), was merged into the expanded city of Tsu; it thus no longer exists as an independent municipality.
