= Ichishi, Mie =

Dissolved municipality in Mie prefecture, Japan

Ichishi (一志町, Ichishi-chō) was a town located in Ichishi District, Mie Prefecture, Japan.

As of 2003, the town had an estimated population of 14,720 and a density of 308.85 persons per km^{2}. The total area was 47.66 km^{2}.

On January 1, 2006, Ichishi, along with the city of Hisai, the towns of Anō, Geinō and Kawage, the village of Misato (all from Age District), the towns of Hakusan and Karasu, and the village of Misugi (all from Ichishi District), was merged into the expanded city of Tsu and thus no longer exists as an independent municipality.
