= Ayama, Mie =

Dissolved municipality in Mie prefecture, Japan

Ayama (阿山町, Ayama-chō) was a town located in Ayama District, Mie Prefecture, Japan.

As of 2003, the town had an estimated population of 8,242 and a density of 112.95 persons per km^{2}. The total area was 72.97 km^{2}.

On November 1, 2004, Ayama, along with the city of Ueno, the town of Iga (former), the villages of Ōyamada and Shimagahara (all from Ayama District), and the town of Aoyama (from Naga District), was merged to create the city of Iga.
