= Misugi, Mie =

Dissolved municipality in Mie prefecture, Japan

Misugi (美杉村, Misugi-mura) was a village located in Ichishi District, Mie Prefecture, Japan.

As of 2003, the village had an estimated population of 6,748 and a density of 32.65 persons per km^{2}. The total area was 206.70 km^{2}.

On January 1, 2006, Misugi, along with the city of Hisai, the towns of Anō, Geinō and Kawage, the village of Misato (all from Age District), the towns of Hakusan, Ichishi and Karasu (all from Ichishi District), was merged into the expanded city of Tsu; it thus no longer exists as an independent municipality.
