= ZTV (Japan) =

Japanese cable television company

- Industry: Cable television
- Headquarters: Tsu, Mie, Japan

ZTV is a cable television operator headquartered in Tsu, Mie Prefecture, Japan.
