= Ueno, Mie =

Dissolved municipality in Mie Prefecture, Japan

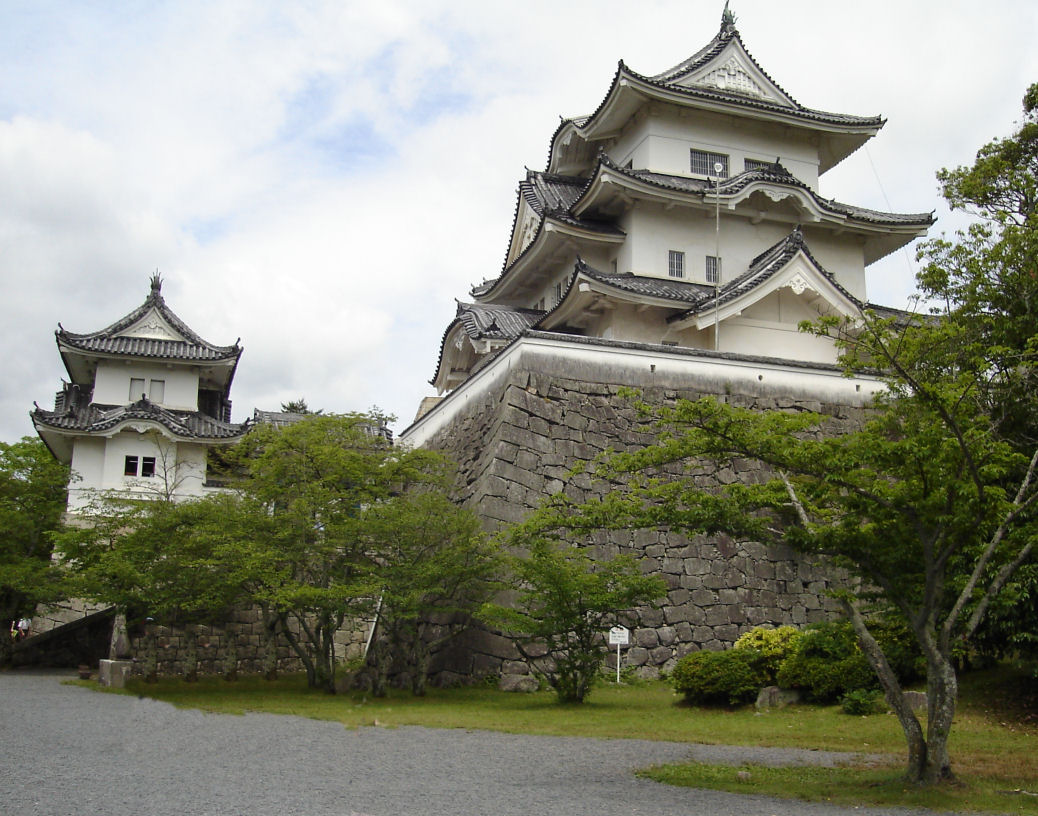
Iga-Ueno Castle

Ueno (上野市, Ueno-shi) was a city located in Mie Prefecture, Japan. The city was founded on September 10, 1941. It was often referred to as Iga-Ueno to avoid confusion with other Uenos, including one in Ise Province which is now part of Yokkaichi.

As of 2003, the city had population estimated about 61,753 and the density was 316.26 persons per km^{2}. The total area was 195.26 km^{2}.

On November 1, 2004, Ueno, along with the towns of Iga (former) and Ayama, the villages of Ōyamada and Shimagahara (all from Ayama District), and the town of Aoyama (from Naga District), were merged to create the city of Iga.

Ueno is the location of Iga Ueno Castle and the Iga-ryū Ninja Museum. In the mid-15th to late 16th century, the site where the castle now stands was the main headquarters of the Iga ikki.
