= Iga, Mie =

City in Mie Prefecture, Japan

Iga 伊賀市
- City
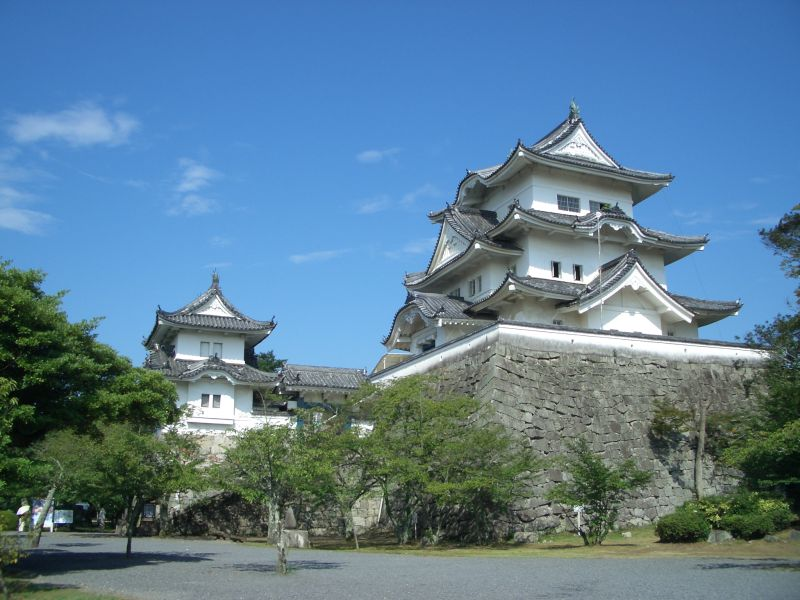
- Iga Ueno Castle

- Flag Seal

- Location of Iga in Mie Prefecture

- Coordinates: 34°45′0″N 136°8′32″E
- Country: Japan
- Region: Kansai
- Prefecture: Mie

Government
  - Mayor: Toshinao Inamori

Area
  - Total: 558.17 km^{2} (215.51 sq mi)

Population (August 31, 2021)
  - Total: 88,895
  - Density: 159.26/km^{2} (412.49/sq mi)
- Time zone: UTC+9 (Japan Standard Time)
- Address: 116 Ueno Marunouchi, Iga-shi, Mie-ken 518-8501
- Climate: Cfa
- Website: Official website
- Symbols
- Bird: Green pheasant
- Flower: Sasayuri (Lilium japonicum)
- Tree: Japanese red pine

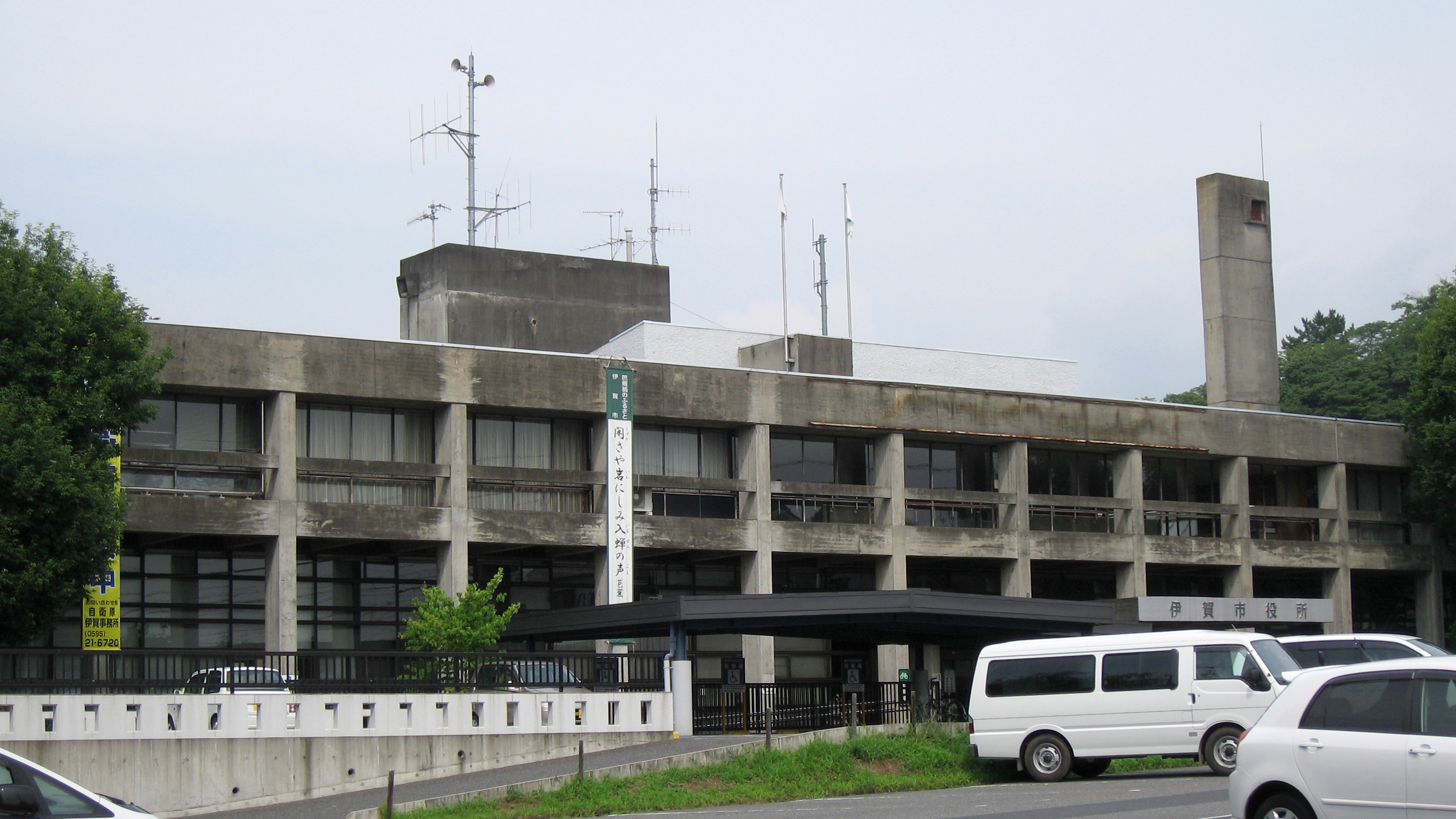
Iga City Hall

Iga (伊賀市, Iga-shi; Japanese pronunciation: [í.ɡä̀, -ŋä̀, ì.ɡä́.ɕì, -ŋä́-]) is a city located in Mie Prefecture, Japan. As of 31 August 2021, the city had an estimated population of 88,895 in 40,620 households and a population density of 160 persons per km². The total area of the city is 558.23 square kilometres (215.53 sq mi).

== History ==
The area around the modern city of Iga corresponds to a portion of ancient Iga Province. The area was noted in the Sengoku period as one of the centers for ninjutsu. From around the 1460s until 1581, the province of Iga was an effectively autonomous confederation governed by a council of local ninja families. The town developed in the Edo period under the Tokugawa Shogunate as a castle town under Iga Ueno Castle. Iga is known as the birthplace of the haiku poet Matsuo Bashō and the home of the ninja Hattori Hanzō.

== Geography ==
Iga is located in northwestern Mie Prefecture. The northeastern part of the city is in the Suzuka Mountains, and the northwestern part is in the Shigaraki Plateau. The southwestern section of the city is the Yamato Highlands, and the southeastern portion is a basin surrounded by the Nunobiki Mountains. The area is very hilly. Since it is on the upper reaches of the Kizu River, which belongs to the Yodo River system, and borders on Shiga, Nara, and Kyoto prefectures, although Mie prefecture is classified as part of the Tōkai region, the Iga region, including Nabari city, is designated as part of the Kansai region.

=== Neighboring municipalities ===
Kyoto Prefecture

- Minamiyamashiro

Mie Prefecture

- Kameyama
- Nabari
- Tsu

Nara Prefecture

- Nara
- Yamazoe

Shiga Prefecture

- Kōka

=== Climate ===
Iga has a humid subtropical climate (Köppen Cfa) characterized by warm summers and cool winters with light to no snowfall. The average annual temperature in Iga is 14.6 °C (58.3 °F). The average annual rainfall is 1,440.9 mm (56.73 in) with June and July as the wettest months. The temperatures are highest on average in August, at around 26.7 °C (80.1 °F), and lowest in January, at around 3.5 °C (38.3 °F).

Climate data for Ueno, Iga (1991−2020 normals, extremes 1937−present)
| Month | Jan | Feb | Mar | Apr | May | Jun | Jul | Aug | Sep | Oct | Nov | Dec | Year |
|---|---|---|---|---|---|---|---|---|---|---|---|---|---|
| Record high °C (°F) | 17.8 (64.0) | 22.1 (71.8) | 25.7 (78.3) | 30.2 (86.4) | 33.8 (92.8) | 36.2 (97.2) | 38.1 (100.6) | 38.8 (101.8) | 37.2 (99.0) | 32.2 (90.0) | 26.5 (79.7) | 22.1 (71.8) | 38.8 (101.8) |
| Mean maximum °C (°F) | 13.2 (55.8) | 16.4 (61.5) | 20.7 (69.3) | 25.7 (78.3) | 29.8 (85.6) | 32.1 (89.8) | 35.1 (95.2) | 35.6 (96.1) | 32.6 (90.7) | 27.7 (81.9) | 21.7 (71.1) | 16.2 (61.2) | 35.8 (96.4) |
| Mean daily maximum °C (°F) | 8.3 (46.9) | 9.4 (48.9) | 13.4 (56.1) | 19.2 (66.6) | 24.0 (75.2) | 26.9 (80.4) | 31.0 (87.8) | 32.5 (90.5) | 28.1 (82.6) | 22.2 (72.0) | 16.5 (61.7) | 10.9 (51.6) | 20.2 (68.4) |
| Daily mean °C (°F) | 3.5 (38.3) | 4.0 (39.2) | 7.3 (45.1) | 12.7 (54.9) | 17.9 (64.2) | 21.8 (71.2) | 25.8 (78.4) | 26.7 (80.1) | 22.8 (73.0) | 16.7 (62.1) | 10.7 (51.3) | 5.7 (42.3) | 14.6 (58.3) |
| Mean daily minimum °C (°F) | −0.6 (30.9) | −0.5 (31.1) | 2.0 (35.6) | 6.8 (44.2) | 12.4 (54.3) | 17.5 (63.5) | 21.9 (71.4) | 22.6 (72.7) | 18.7 (65.7) | 12.1 (53.8) | 5.7 (42.3) | 1.2 (34.2) | 10.0 (50.0) |
| Mean minimum °C (°F) | −4.0 (24.8) | −4.0 (24.8) | −2.3 (27.9) | 0.7 (33.3) | 6.7 (44.1) | 12.4 (54.3) | 18.6 (65.5) | 18.8 (65.8) | 12.9 (55.2) | 5.9 (42.6) | 0.4 (32.7) | −2.7 (27.1) | −4.7 (23.5) |
| Record low °C (°F) | −9.6 (14.7) | −9.6 (14.7) | −7.8 (18.0) | −4.8 (23.4) | −0.8 (30.6) | 5.6 (42.1) | 11.3 (52.3) | 11.1 (52.0) | 5.1 (41.2) | −1.0 (30.2) | −5.0 (23.0) | −9.5 (14.9) | −9.6 (14.7) |
| Average precipitation mm (inches) | 50.9 (2.00) | 60.0 (2.36) | 104.2 (4.10) | 104.2 (4.10) | 139.7 (5.50) | 194.3 (7.65) | 194.3 (7.65) | 136.4 (5.37) | 187.3 (7.37) | 146.7 (5.78) | 72.1 (2.84) | 50.8 (2.00) | 1,440.9 (56.73) |
| Average precipitation days (≥ 1.0 mm) | 6.5 | 7.2 | 9.9 | 9.5 | 9.8 | 12.2 | 11.9 | 8.6 | 10.0 | 9.1 | 6.9 | 6.8 | 108.4 |
| Average relative humidity (%) | 71 | 70 | 69 | 67 | 69 | 75 | 76 | 75 | 77 | 77 | 76 | 73 | 73 |
| Mean monthly sunshine hours | 125.0 | 121.0 | 154.7 | 174.8 | 183.4 | 132.8 | 155.3 | 191.7 | 142.0 | 143.4 | 136.1 | 135.0 | 1,806.9 |
Source: Japan Meteorological Agency

=== Demographics ===
Per Japanese census data, the population of Iga has remained relatively constant over the past 60 years.

Historical population
| Year | Pop. | ±% |
|---|---|---|
| 1960 | 99,821 | — |
| 1970 | 92,841 | −7.0% |
| 1980 | 95,582 | +3.0% |
| 1990 | 97,752 | +2.3% |
| 2000 | 101,527 | +3.9% |
| 2010 | 97,215 | −4.2% |

The town of Ueno was established on April 1, 1889, with the creation of the modern municipalities system. It was raised to city status on September 10, 1941. On November 1, 2004, Ueno merged with the towns of Iga and Ayama, the villages of Shimagahara and Ōyamada (all from Ayama District); and the town of Aoyama (from Naga District) to form the city of Iga.

== Government ==
Iga has a mayor-council form of government with a directly elected mayor and a unicameral city council of 22 members. Iga contributes two members to the Mie Prefectural Assembly. In terms of national politics, the city is part of Mie 3rd district of the lower house of the Diet of Japan.

== Economy ==
Iga is traditionally known as a center for Kumihimo, a traditional braiding art, with several artisans still in activity. The city is a regional commercial center and the local economy is dominated by agriculture and seasonal tourism. Since Iga is geographically located between Osaka and Nagoya, the number of factories located along the Meihan National Highway is increasing, especially due to the convenience of logistics.

== Education ==
Iga has 19 public elementary schools and ten public middle schools operated by the city government and three public high schools operated by the Mie Prefectural Department of Education. The city also has two private high schools and one combined private middle/high school.

=== International schools ===
- Colégio Positivo - Brazilian primary school, founded in 2013.

== Transportation ==
=== Railway ===
JR West – Kansai Main Line

- Tsuge - Shindō - Sanagu - Iga-Ueno - Shimagahara

JR West – Kusatsu Line

- Tsuge

Kintetsu Railway – Osaka Line

- Iga-Kambe - Aoyamachō - Iga-Kōzu - Nishi-Aoyama

■ Iga Railway – Iga Line

- Iga-Ueno - Nii - Nishi-Ōte - Uenoshi - Hirokōji - Kayamachi - Kuwamachi - Idamichi - Ichibe - Inako - Maruyama - Uebayashi - Hido - Iga-Kambe

=== Highway ===
- Meihan Expressway
- National Route 25
- National Route 163
- National Route 165
- National Route 368
- National Route 422

== Local attractions ==
Two of Iga's main tourist attractions are the Iga Ueno Castle and the Iga-ryū Ninja Museum (the area around the city being the historical home of the famous Iga Ninja). There is also an annual Iga Ueno Ninja Festa ninja festival (April 1 to May 6).

Other not so well known attractions include:

- Otogitoge Pass is one pass that Tokugawa Ieyasu passed over as he hurriedly crossed Iga to return to Okazaki, helped along by the people of Iga and Koka, during the Honnoji War.
- Momochi Fortress is the fortress of Momochi Tanbanomikami, who is said to be one of the three great ninja, and nearby is Seiunzenji, where his grave is located.
- Sainenji Temple is a Jodoshu (Pure Land) temple and is the burial place of Fujibayashi Samujiyasutake, the author of one of the great books of ninjutsu, "Bansenshukai".
- Fujiwara no Chikata Kutsu is the castle of Fujiwara no Chikata who appears in the Taiheiki, or Records of Great Peace.
- A statue of Sonic the Hedgehog which was erected in the 1990s for a Sega World location in Kadoma. The statue's owner died, and it is now owned by their children. It was deteriorating until 2020, when the owners finally restored it.
- One of the last operational examples of a first generation Yamaha Music Siren is located on top of the Iga City Hall and can be heard playing music at set times throughout the day. The siren uses a system of dampers around eight choppers, each with different sized holes, in order to produce music. Due to Yamaha ending support for all models of the Music Siren, it has become extremely difficult to find examples still in operation.

== International relations ==
- Jurong, Jiangsu, China

== Notable people from Iga ==
- Matsuo Bashō, poet
- Hakaru Hashimoto, medical scientist
- Akiko Iwasaki, immunologist and professor at Yale University
- Jirō Kawasaki, politician
- Shuto Machino, professional soccer player
- Genichi Mitsuhashi, first Ninja studies graduate
- Wasabi Mizuta, voice actor
- Ichizo Nakata, professional soccer player
- Koji Nishimura, professional soccer player
- Kippei Shiina, actor
- Chiyonokuni Toshiki, sumo wrestler
- Kazuhiro Yamaji, actor, voice actor

== See also ==
- Iga-ryū, the Iga ninja school of ninjutsu
