= Naga District, Mie =

Former district in Mie prefecture, Japan

Naga (名賀郡, Naga-gun) was a district located in Mie Prefecture, Japan.

As of 2003, the district had an estimated population of 11,590 and a density of 106.33 persons per km^{2}. The total area was 109.00 km^{2}.

== Towns and villages ==
The district had only one town left before dissolution:

- Aoyama

== Merger ==
- On November 1, 2004 - the town of Aoyama was merged with the city of Ueno, the towns of Iga (former) Ayama, and the villages of Ōyamada and Shimagahara (all from Ayama District) to create the city of Iga. Naga District was dissolved as a result of this merger.
