= Ayama District, Mie =

Former district in Mie prefecture, Japan

Ayama (阿山郡, Ayama-gun) was a district located in Mie Prefecture, Japan.

As of 2003, the district had an estimated population of 27,539 and a density of 108.46 persons per km^{2}. The total area was 253.91 km^{2}.

== Towns and villages ==
There were four municipalities within the district before dissolution:

- Ayama
- Iga
- Ōyamada
- Shimagahara

== Merger ==
- On November 1, 2004 - the former town of Iga absorbed the town of Ayama, the villages of Ōyamada and Shimagahara were merged with the city of Ueno, and the town of Aoyama (from Naga District) to create the city of Iga. Ayama District was dissolved as a result of this merger.
