= Uebayashi Station =

Railway station in Iga, Mie Prefecture, Japan

Uebayashi Station 上林駅
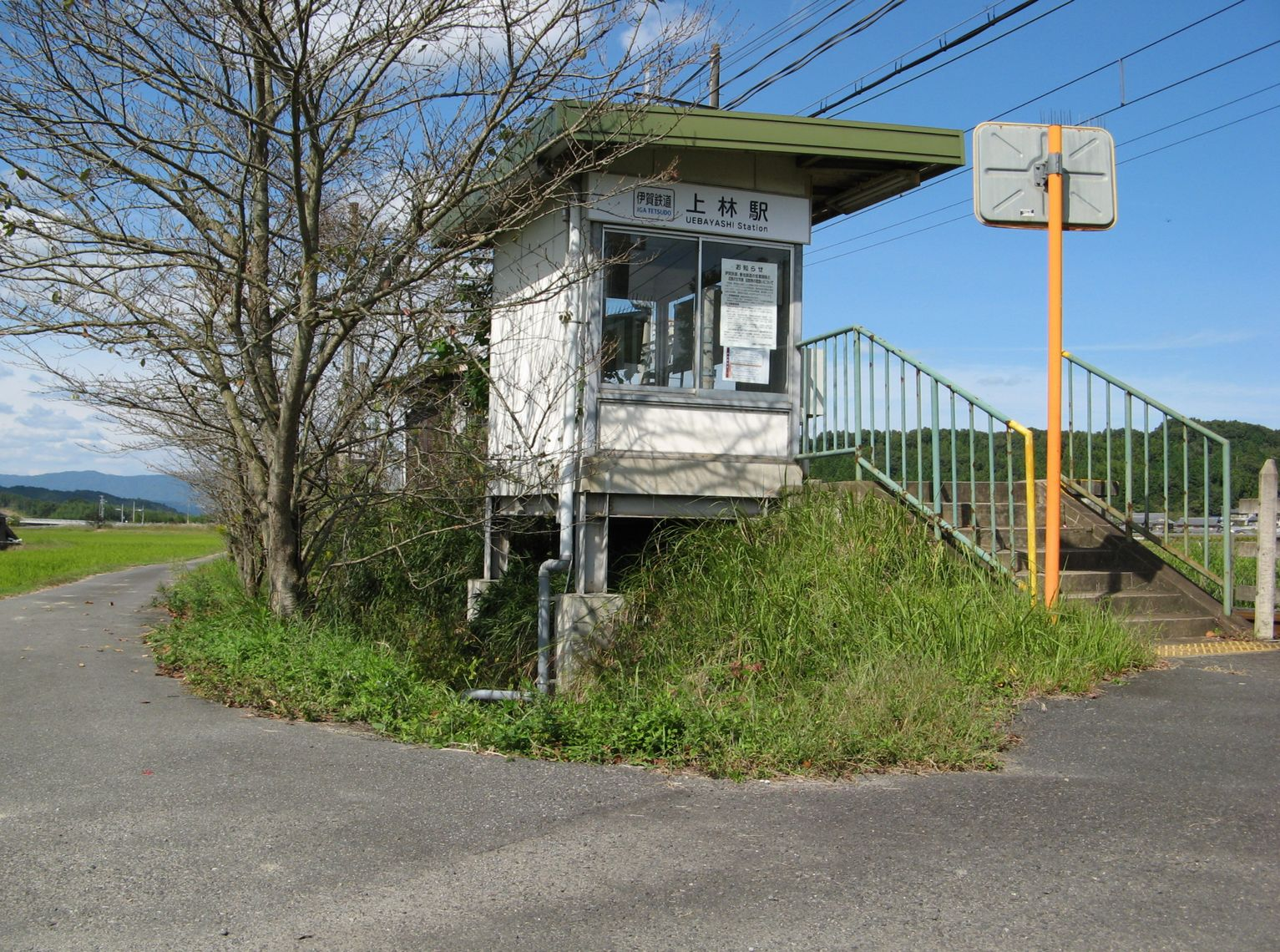
- Uebayashi Station in October 2007

General information
- Location: Uebayashi, Iga-shi, Mie-ken 518-0112; Mie Prefecture; Japan
- Coordinates: 34.6952°N 136.1611°E
- Operator: Iga Railway
- Line: ■ Iga Line
- Distance: 13.0 km from Iga-Ueno
- Platforms: 1 side platform

Other information
- Website: Official website

History
- Opened: May 25, 1926

Passengers
- FY2019: 12 daily
Location
- Location within Mie Prefecture Location within Japan

Uebayashi Station (上林駅, Uebayashi-eki) is a passenger railway station located in the city of Iga, Mie Prefecture, Japan, operated by the private railway operator Iga Railway.

== Lines ==
Uebayashi Station is served by the Iga Line, and is located 13.0 rail kilometers from the starting point of the line at Iga-Ueno Station.

== Station layout ==
The station consists of a single side platform serving bidirectional traffic. The station is unattended and has no station building. The platform is short and can only handle trains of two cars in length.

== Platform ==
1	■ Iga Line	For Iga-Ueno; For Iga-Kambe

== Adjacent stations ==
«	Service	»
Iga Line
Maruyama	-	Hido

== History ==
Uebayashi Station was opened on May 25, 1926. Through a series of mergers, the Iga Line became part of the Kintetsu network by June 1, 1944, but was spun out as an independent company in October 2007. The station was closed from June 1, 1945, through March 15, 1946.

== Passenger statistics ==
In fiscal 2019, the station was used by an average of 12 passengers daily (boarding passengers only).

== Surrounding area ==
- Japan National Route 422
- Kizu River

== See also ==
- List of railway stations in Japan
