= Kayamachi Station =

Railway station in Iga, Mie Prefecture, Japan

Kayamachi Station 茅町駅
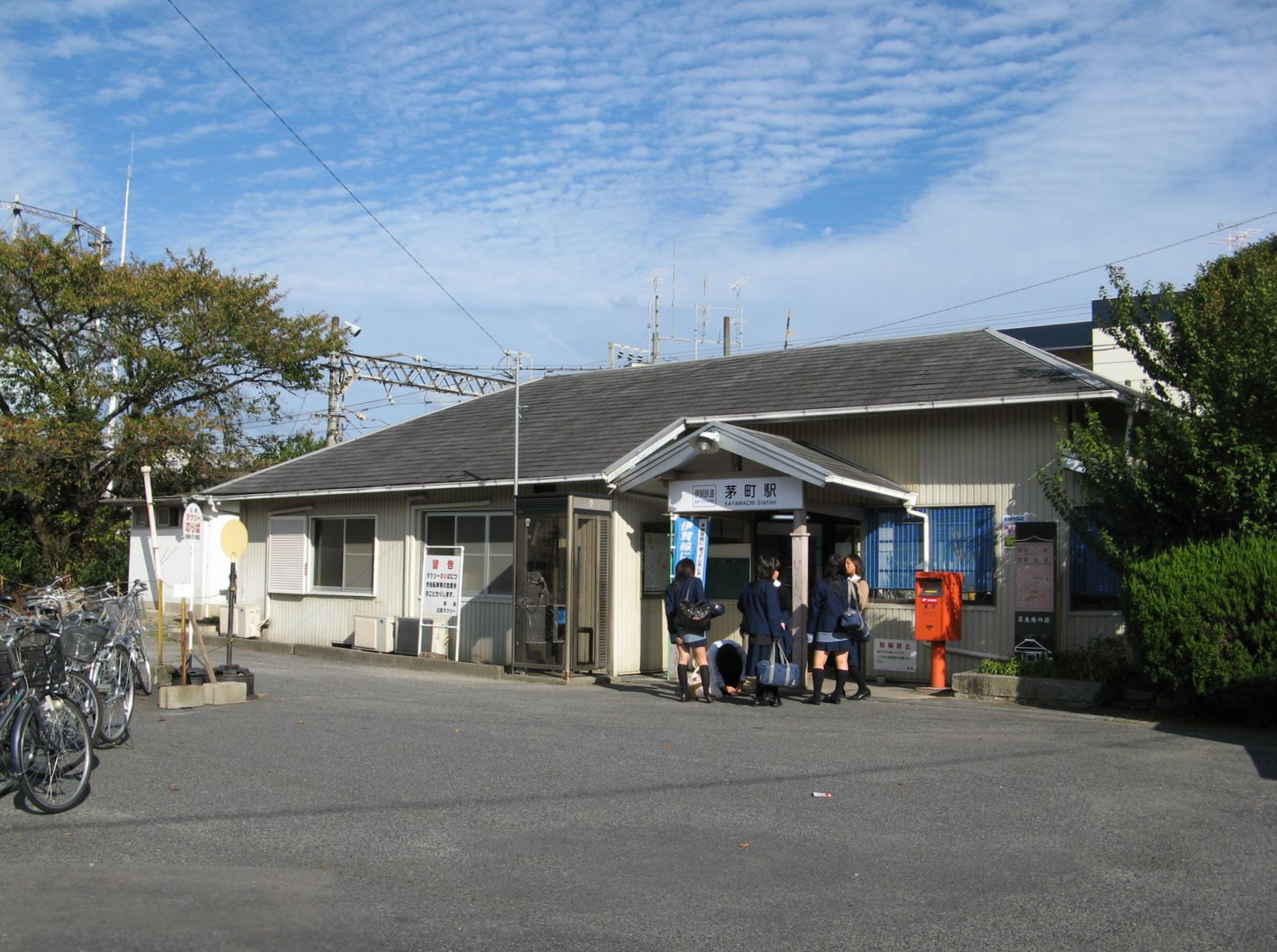
- Kayamachi Station in October 2007

General information
- Location: Ueno-Kayamachi, Iga-shi, Mie-ken 518-0838; Japan
- Coordinates: 34.7615°N 136.1355°E
- Operator: Iga Railway
- Line: ■ Iga Line
- Distance: 5.0 km from Iga-Ueno
- Platforms: 1 island platform

Other information
- Website: Official website

History
- Opened: July 18, 1922

Passengers
- FY2019: 376 daily
Location
- Location within Mie Prefecture Location within Japan

Kayamachi Station (茅町駅, Kayamachi-eki) is a passenger railway station in located in the city of Iga, Mie Prefecture, Japan, operated by the private railway operator Iga Railway.

== Lines ==
Kayamachi Station is served by the Iga Line, and is located 5.0 rail kilometers from the starting point of the line at Iga-Ueno Station.

== Station layout ==
The station consists of a single island platform connected to the station building by a level crossing. The platform is short and can only accommodate trains of two cars in length.

== Platforms ==
1	■ Iga Line	for Iga-Kambe
2	■ Iga Line	for Uenoshi, Iga-Ueno

== Adjacent stations ==
«	Service	»
Iga Line
Hirokōji	-	Kuwamachi

== History ==
Kayamachi Station was opened on July 18, 1922. Through a series of mergers, the Iga Line became part of the Kintetsu network by June 1, 1944, but was spun out as an independent company in October 2007. All freight operations were suspended from October 1, 1973.

== Passenger statistics ==
In fiscal 2019, the station was used by an average of 376 passengers daily (boarding passengers only).

== Surrounding area ==
- Mie Prefectural Iga Hakuho High School
- Ueno Braille Library

== See also ==
- List of railway stations in Japan
