= Maruyama Station (Mie) =

Railway station in Iga, Mie Prefecture, Japan

Maruyama Station 丸山駅
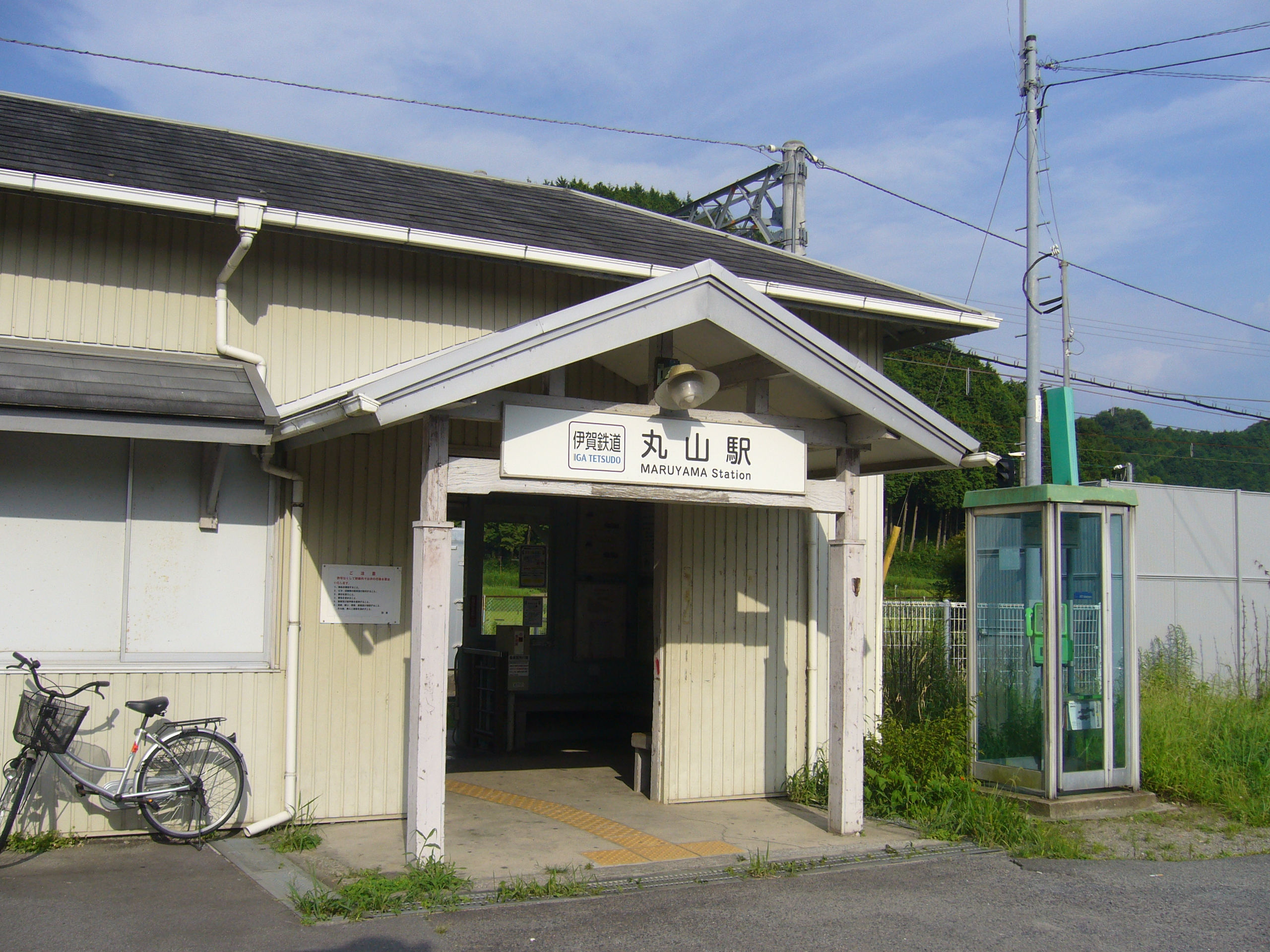
- Maruyama Station in August 2009

General information
- Location: Zairyo, Iga-shi, Mie-ken 518-0107; Japan
- Coordinates: 34°42′16″N 136°09′27″E
- Operator: Iga Railway
- Line: ■ Iga Line
- Distance: 11.9 km from Iga-Ueno
- Platforms: 1 side platforms

Other information
- Website: Official website

History
- Opened: July 18, 1922

Passengers
- FY2019: 37 daily
Location
- Location within Mie Prefecture Location within Japan

Maruyama Station (丸山駅, Maruyama-eki) is a passenger railway station in located in the city of Iga, Mie Prefecture, Japan, operated by the private railway operator Iga Railway.

== Lines ==
Maruyama Station is served by the Iga Line, and is located 11.9 rail kilometers from the starting point of the line at Iga-Ueno Station.

== Station layout ==
The station consists of a single side platform serving bidirectional traffic. The station is unattended and has no station building. The platform is short and can only handle trains of two cars in length.

== Platform ==
1	■ Iga Line	For Iga-Ueno; For Iga-Kambe

== Adjacent stations ==
«	Service	»
Iga Line
Inako	-	Uebayashi

== History ==
Maruyama Station was opened on July 18, 1922. Through a series of mergers, the Iga Line became part of the Kintetsu network by June 1, 1944, but was spun out as an independent company in October 2007. All freight operations were suspended in October 1973.

== Passenger statistics ==
In fiscal 2019, the station was used by an average of 37 passengers daily (boarding passengers only).

== Surrounding area ==
- Japan National Route 422
- Kizu River

== See also ==
- List of railway stations in Japan
