= Hirokōji Station =

Hirokōji Station may refer to:

- Hirokōji Station (Mie), a railway station in Iga, Mie Prefecture, Japan
- Hirokōji Station (Toyama), a city tram station in Takaoka, Toyama Prefecture, Japan
