= Kuwamachi Station =

Railway station in Iga, Mie Prefecture, Japan

Kuwamachi Station 桑町駅
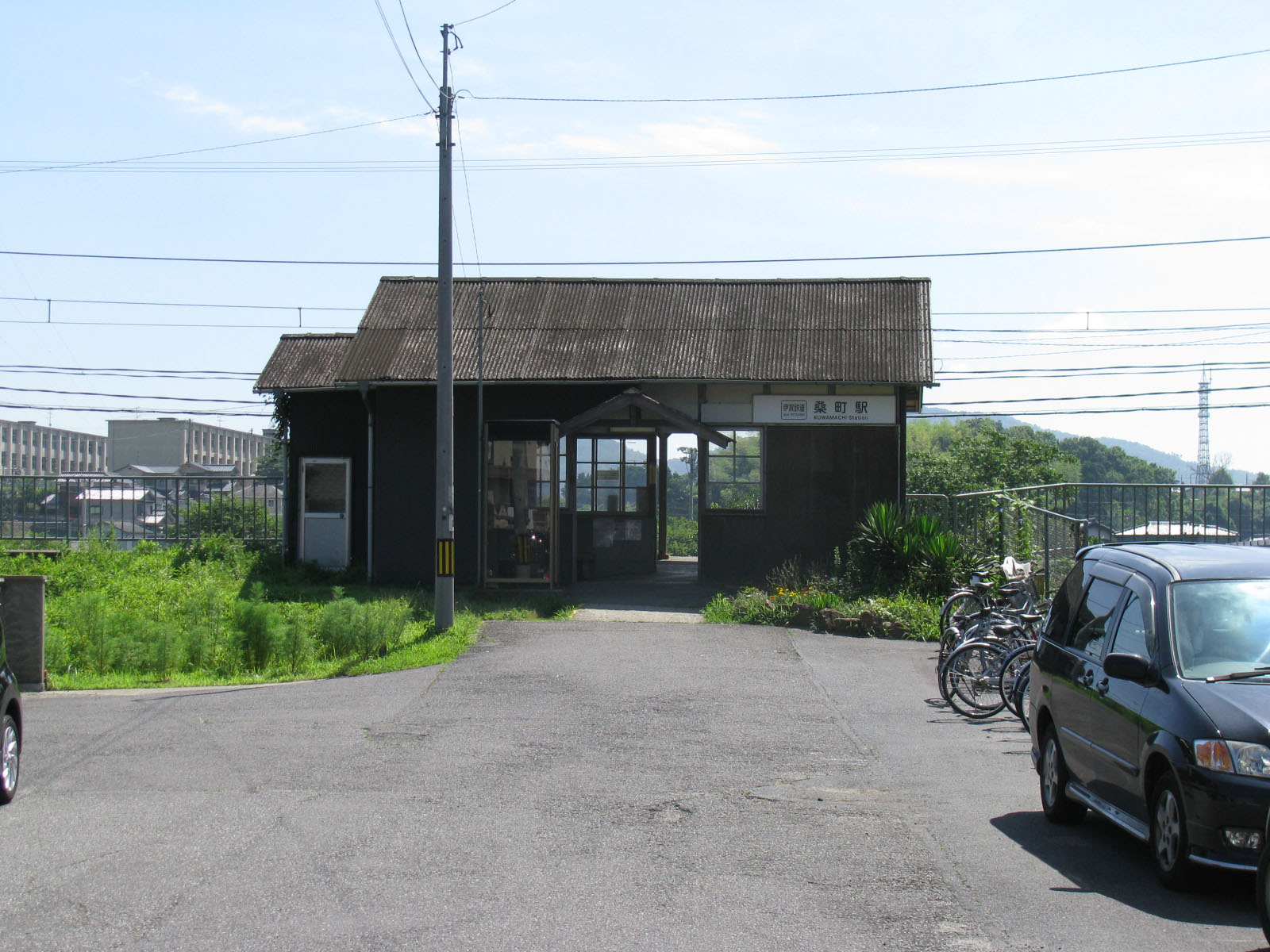
- Kuwamachi Station in July 2008

General information
- Location: Shijyuku-cho, Iga-shi, Mie-ken 518-0823; Japan
- Coordinates: 34.7540°N 136.1367°E
- Operator: Iga Railway
- Line: ■ Iga Line
- Distance: 5.8 km from Iga-Ueno
- Platforms: 1 side platform

Other information
- Website: Official website

History
- Opened: July 18, 1922

Passengers
- FY2019: 109 daily
Location
- Location within Mie Prefecture Location within Japan

Kuwamachi Station (桑町駅, Kuwamachi-eki) is a passenger railway station in located in the city of Iga, Mie Prefecture, Japan, operated by the private railway operator Iga Railway.

== Lines ==
Kuwamachi Station is served by the Iga Line, and is located 5.8 rail kilometers from the starting point of the line at Iga-Ueno Station.

== Station layout ==
The station consists of a single side platform serving bidirectional traffic. The station is unattended. The platform is short and can only handle trains of two cars in length.

== Platform ==
1	■ Iga Line	For Iga-Ueno; For Iga-Kambe

== Adjacent stations ==
«	Service	»
Iga Line
Kayamachi	-	Shijuku

== History ==
Kuwamachi Station was opened on July 18, 1922. Through a series of mergers, the Iga Line became part of the Kintetsu network by June 1, 1944, but was spun out as an independent company in October 2007. The station has been unattended since 1977.

== Passenger statistics ==
In fiscal 2019, the station was used by an average of 109 passengers daily (boarding passengers only).

== Surrounding area ==
- Mie Prefectural Iga Hakuho High School
- Ueno Kuwamachi Post Office
- Okanami General Hospital

== See also ==
- List of railway stations in Japan
