= Nishi-Ōte Station =

Railway station in Iga, Mie Prefecture, Japan

Nishi-Ōte Station 西大手駅
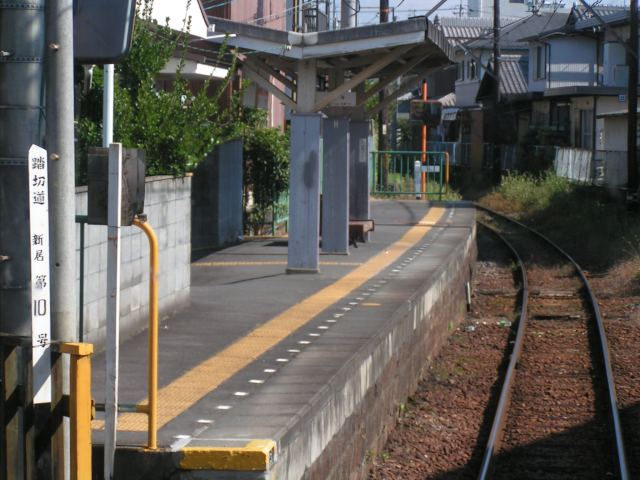
- Nishi-Ōte Station in October 2005

General information
- Location: Nishi-Ōte, Iga-shi, Mie-ken 518-0878; Japan
- Coordinates: 34.7669°N 136.1248°E
- Operator: Iga Railway
- Line: ■ Iga Line
- Distance: 3.3 km from Iga-Ueno
- Platforms: 1 side platform
- Tracks: 1

Other information
- Website: Official website

History
- Opened: August 8, 1916

Passengers
- FY2019: 107 daily
Location
- Location within Mie Prefecture Location within Japan

Nishi-Ōte Station (西大手駅, Nishi-Ōte-eki) is a passenger railway station in located in the city of Iga, Mie Prefecture, Japan, operated by the private railway operator Iga Railway.

== Lines ==
Nishi-Ōte Station is served by the Iga Line, and is located 3.3 rail kilometers from the starting point of the line at Iga-Ueno Station.

== Station layout ==
The station consists of a single side platform serving bidirectional traffic. The station is unattended.

== Platform ==
1	■ Iga Line	For Iga-Ueno; For Iga-Kambe

== Adjacent stations ==
«	Service	»
Iga Line
Nii	-	Uenoshi

== History ==
Nishi-Ōte Station was opened on August 8, 1916. Through a series of mergers, the Iga Line became part of the Kintetsu network by June 1, 1944, but was spun out as an independent company in October 2007. Freight operations were discontinued from October 1973 and the station has been unattended since March 15, 2000.

== Passenger statistics ==
In fiscal 2019, the station was used by an average of 107 passengers daily (boarding passengers only).

== Surrounding area ==
- Mie Prefectural Ueno High School
- Iga City Suko Junior High School
- Asahi Inari Taisha Shrine

== See also ==
- List of railway stations in Japan
