= Inako Station =

Inako Station is the name of two train stations in Japan:

- Inako Station (Mie) (依那古駅)
- Inako Station (Shizuoka) (稲子駅)
