= Inako Station (Mie) =

Railway station in Iga, Mie Prefecture, Japan

Inako Station 依那古駅
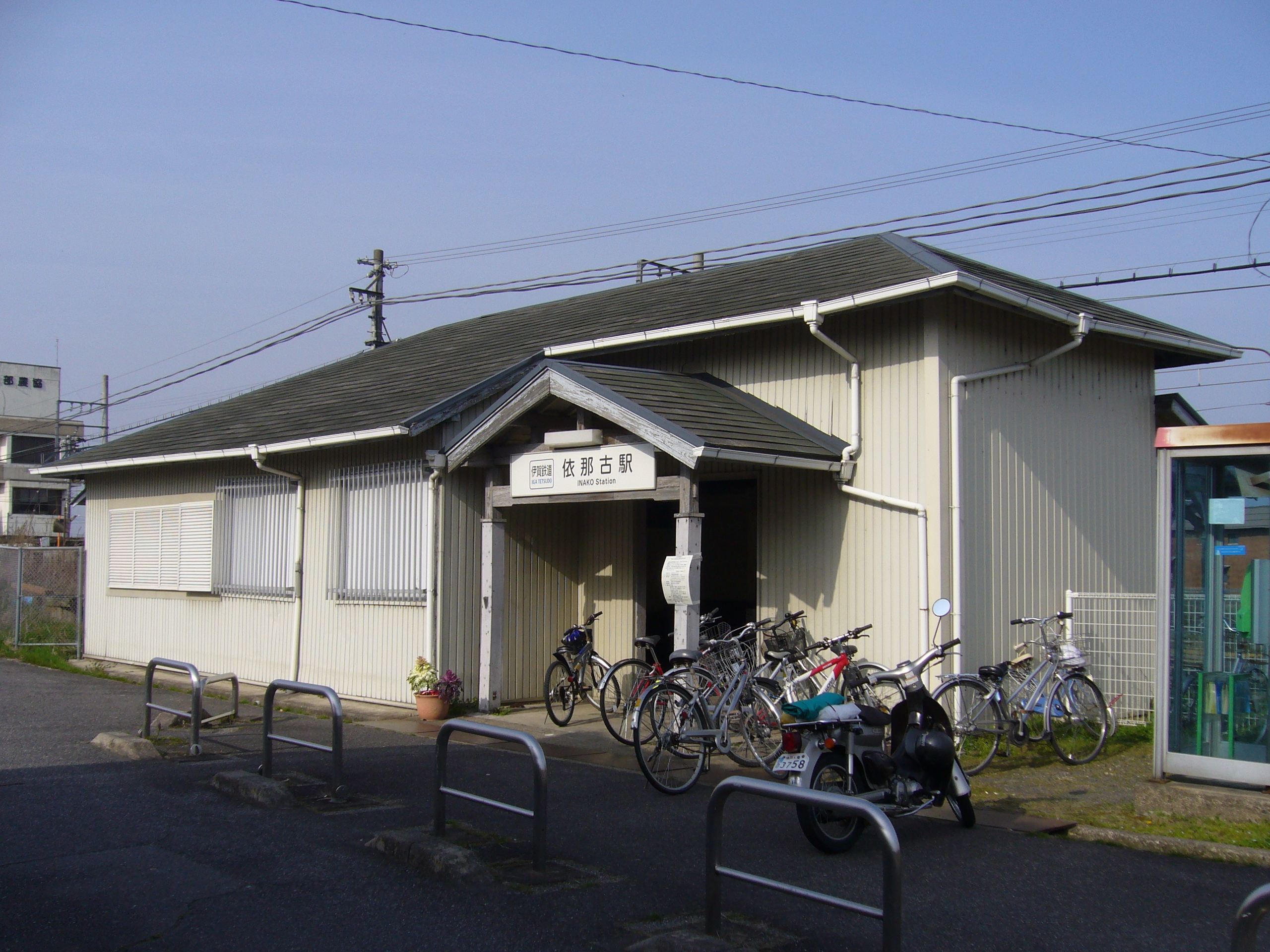
- Inako Station in March 2010

General information
- Location: Oki, Iga, Mie-ken 518-0103; Japan
- Coordinates: 34.7151°N 136.1532°E
- Operator: Iga Railway
- Line: ■ Iga Line
- Distance: 10.6 km from Iga-Ueno
- Platforms: 1 side platforms

Other information
- Website: Official website

History
- Opened: July 18, 1922

Passengers
- FY2019: 49 daily
Location
- Location within Mie Prefecture Location within Japan

Inako Station (依那古駅, Inako-eki) is a passenger railway station in located in the city of Iga, Mie Prefecture, Japan, operated by the private railway operator Iga Railway.

== Lines ==
Inako Station is served by the Iga Line, and is located 10.6 rail kilometers from the starting point of the line at Iga-Ueno Station.

== Station layout ==
The station consists of a single side platform serving bidirectional traffic. The station is unattended and has no station building. The platform is short and can only handle trains of two cars in length.

== Platform ==
1	■ Iga Line	For Iga-Ueno; For Iga-Kambe

== Adjacent stations ==
«	Service	»
Iga Line
Ichibe	-	Maruyama

== History ==
Inako Station was opened on July 18, 1922. Through a series of mergers, the Iga Line became part of the Kintetsu network by June 1, 1944, but was spun out as an independent company in October 2007.

== Passenger statistics ==
In fiscal 2019, the station was used by an average of 49 passengers daily (boarding passengers only).

== Surrounding area ==
- Iga City Inako Elementary School
- Japan National Route 422
- Kizu River

== See also ==
- List of railway stations in Japan
