= Nii Station (Mie) =

Railway station in Iga, Mie Prefecture, Japan

Nii Station 新居駅
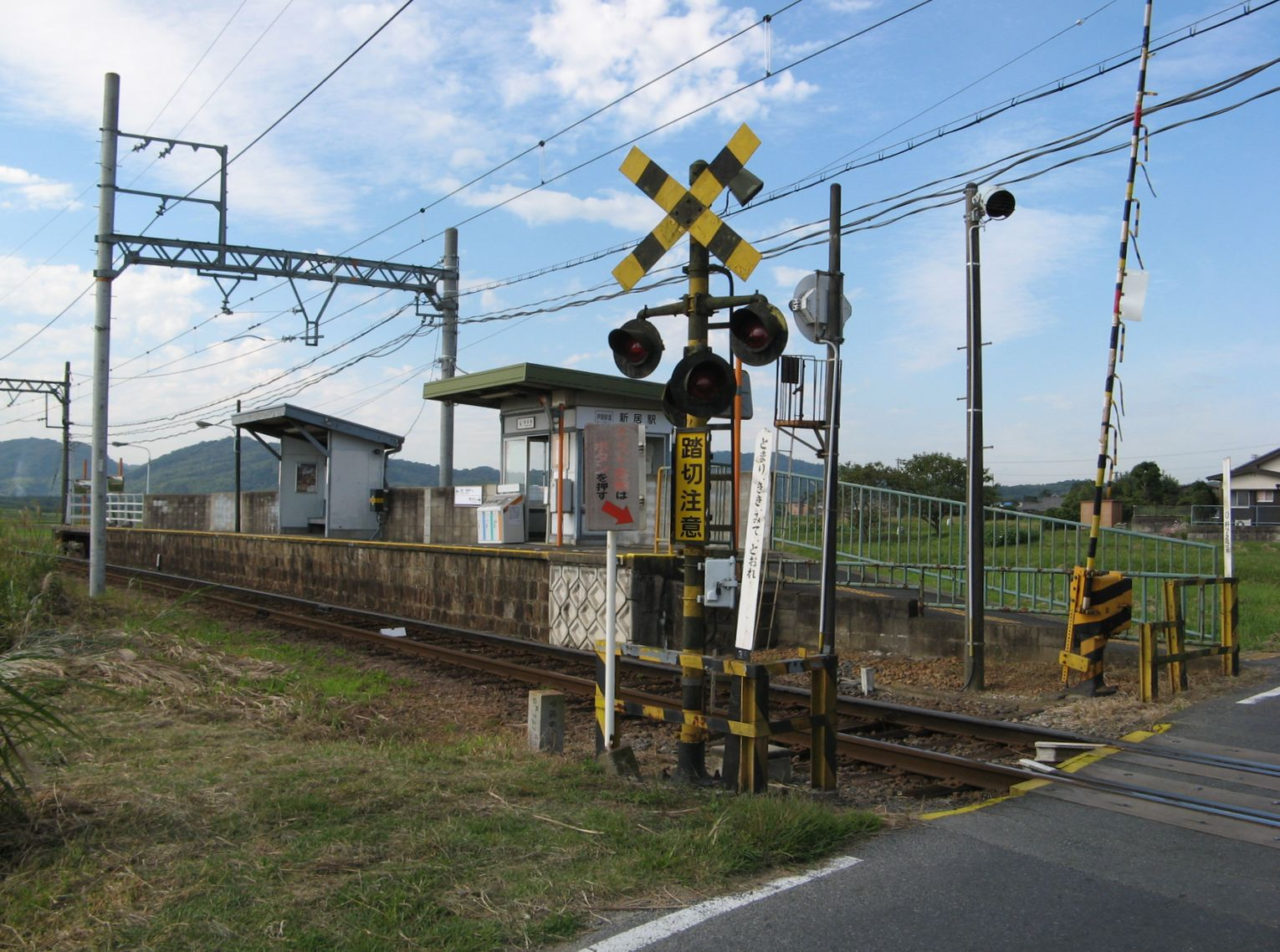
- Nii Station in October 2007

General information
- Location: Higashi Takakura, Iga-shi, Mie-ken 518-0024; Japan
- Coordinates: 34.7864°N 136.1161°E
- Operator: Iga Railway
- Line: ■ Iga Line
- Distance: 0.8 km from Iga-Ueno
- Platforms: 1 side platform

Other information
- Website: Official website

History
- Opened: August 8, 1916

Passengers
- FY2019: 50 daily
Location
- Location within Mie Prefecture Location within Japan

Nii Station (新居駅, Nii-eki) is a passenger railway station in located in the city of Iga, Mie Prefecture, Japan, operated by the private railway operator Iga Railway.

== Lines ==
Nii Station is served by the Iga Line, and is located 0.8 rail kilometers from the starting point of the line at Iga-Ueno Station.

== Station layout ==
The station consists of a single side platform serving bidirectional traffic. The station is unattended and has no station building. The platform is short and can only handle trains of two cars in length.

== Platform ==
1	■ Iga Line	For Iga-Ueno; For Iga-Kambe

== Adjacent stations ==
«	Service	»
Iga Line
Iga-Ueno	-	Nishi-Ōte

== History ==
Nii Station was opened on August 8, 1916. Through a series of mergers, the Iga Line became part of the Kintetsu network by June 1, 1944, but was spun out as an independent company in October 2007.

== Passenger statistics ==
In fiscal 2019, the station was used by an average of 50 passengers daily (boarding passengers only).

== Surrounding area ==
- Mie Prefectural Road 680 Takakura Sanagi Line
- Tsuge River

== See also ==
- List of railway stations in Japan
