= Tokyu 1000 series =

Japanese train type

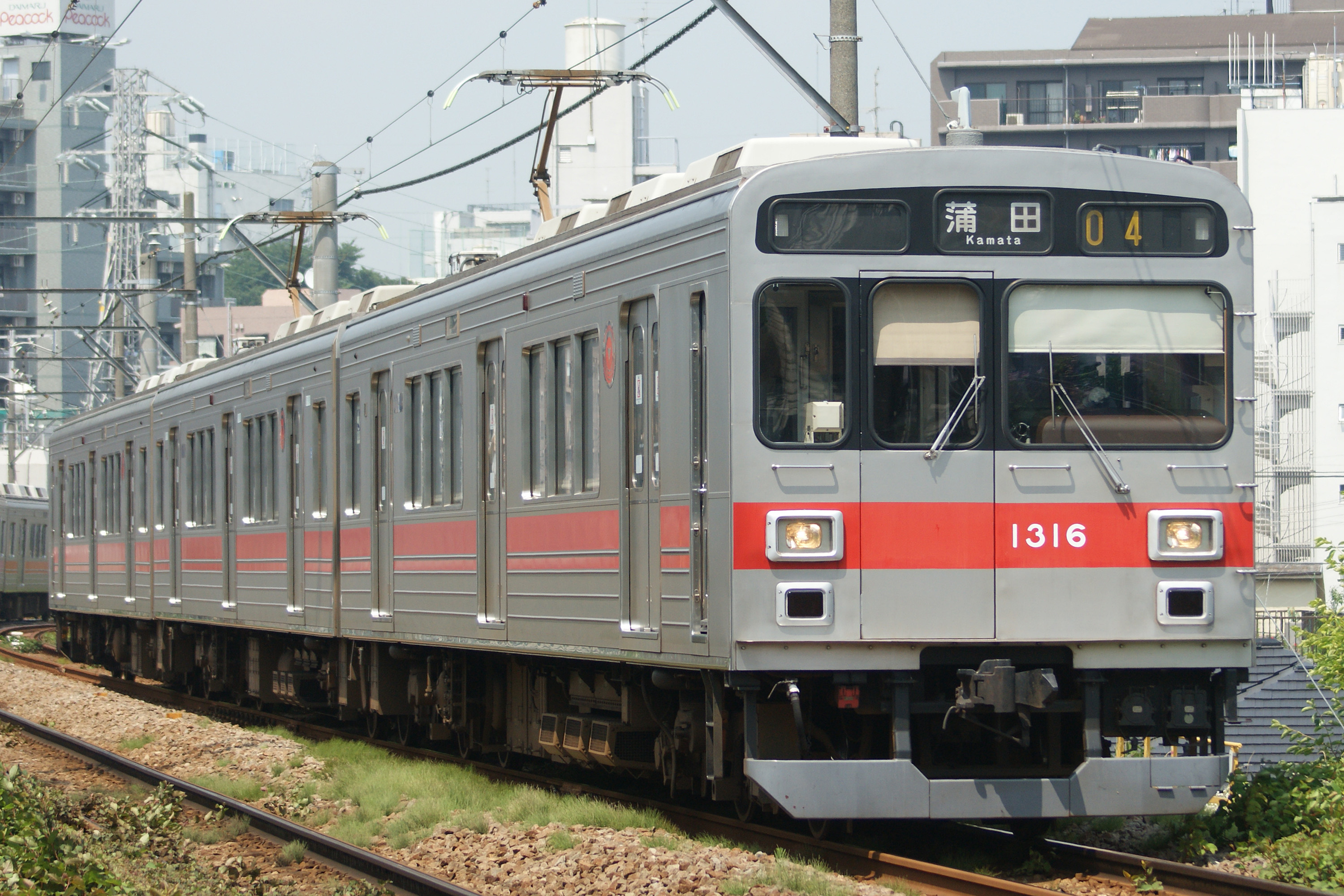
- 3-car Ikegami Line set 1016 in July 2008
- Constructed: 1988–1993
- Entered service: December 1988
- Refurbished: 2014–
- Number built: 113 vehicles
- Number in service: 27 vehicles (9 sets)
- Formation: 3 (formerly 4/8) cars per trainset
- Operator: Tokyu Corporation
- Lines served: Ikegami Line; Tokyu Tamagawa Line

Specifications
- Car body construction: Stainless steel
- Car length: 18,000 mm (59 ft 1 in)
- Width: 2,800 mm (9 ft 2 in)
- Doors: 3 pairs per side
- Maximum speed: 120 km/h (75 mph)
- Traction system: Variable frequency (GTO) (1000 series sets); Variable frequency (IGBT) (1000-1500 series sets)
- Acceleration: 3.5 km/(h⋅s) (2.2 mph/s)
- Deceleration: 3.5 km/(h⋅s) (2.2 mph/s) (service); 4.5 km/(h⋅s) (2.8 mph/s) (emergency)
- Electric system: 1,500 V DC
- Current collection: Overhead wire
- Track gauge: 1,067 mm (3 ft 6 in)

The Tokyu 1000 series (東急1000系, Tōkyū 1000-kei) is an electric multiple unit (EMU) train type operated by the private railway operator Tokyu Corporation on the Tokyu Ikegami and Tokyu Tamagawa lines in Japan since 1988.

== Design ==
Based on the earlier Tokyu 9000 series design, the 1000 series trains were built for use on through-running services to and from the Tokyo Metro Hibiya Line. Cars are 18 metres (59 ft 1 in) and have three pairs of doors per side.

== Operations ==
Three-car sets have operated on the Tokyu Ikegami Line since 1993. Four-car sets formerly operated on the Tokyu Mekama Line (present-day Tokyu Tamagawa Line and Tokyu Meguro Line), and eight-car formations formerly operated on the Tokyu Toyoko Line, with through-running to and from the Tokyo Metro Hibiya Line. The former were reformed as three-car sets, and the latter were taken out of use from 15 March 2013. From May 2014, former eight-car Tokyu Toyoko Line sets were reformed into three-car sets and refurbished for use on the Tokyu Tamagawa Line and Tokyu Meguro Line, reclassified as 1000-1500 series.

== Formations ==
=== 3-car sets ===
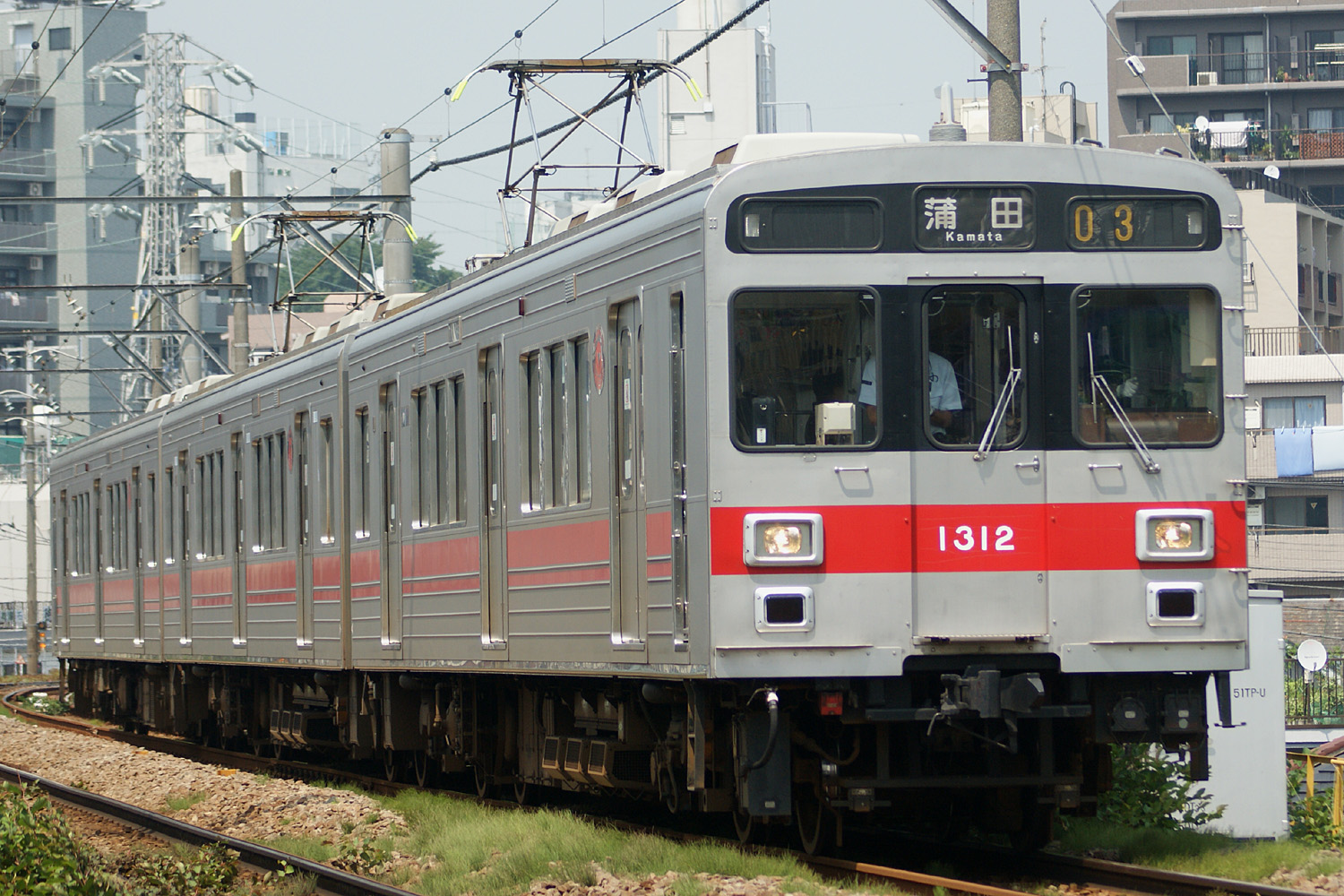
3-car set 1012 with a central gangway door (former 4-car set) in July 2008

As of 1 April 2013, the fleet consists of nine three-car sets, formed as follows, with two motored ("M") cars and one non-powered trailer ("T") car, and car 1 at the Gotanda/Tamagawa end.

Car No.	1	2	3
Designation	Tc	M	Mc
Numbering	1000	1200	1300

Sets 1012 and 1014 have end cars with a central gangway door instead of the offset emergency gangway door on other units. These two sets were originally built as four-car sets designed to operate in pairs on Toyoko Line through services. Cars 2 and 3 are each fitted with a single-arm pantograph.

=== 3-car 1000-1500 series sets ===
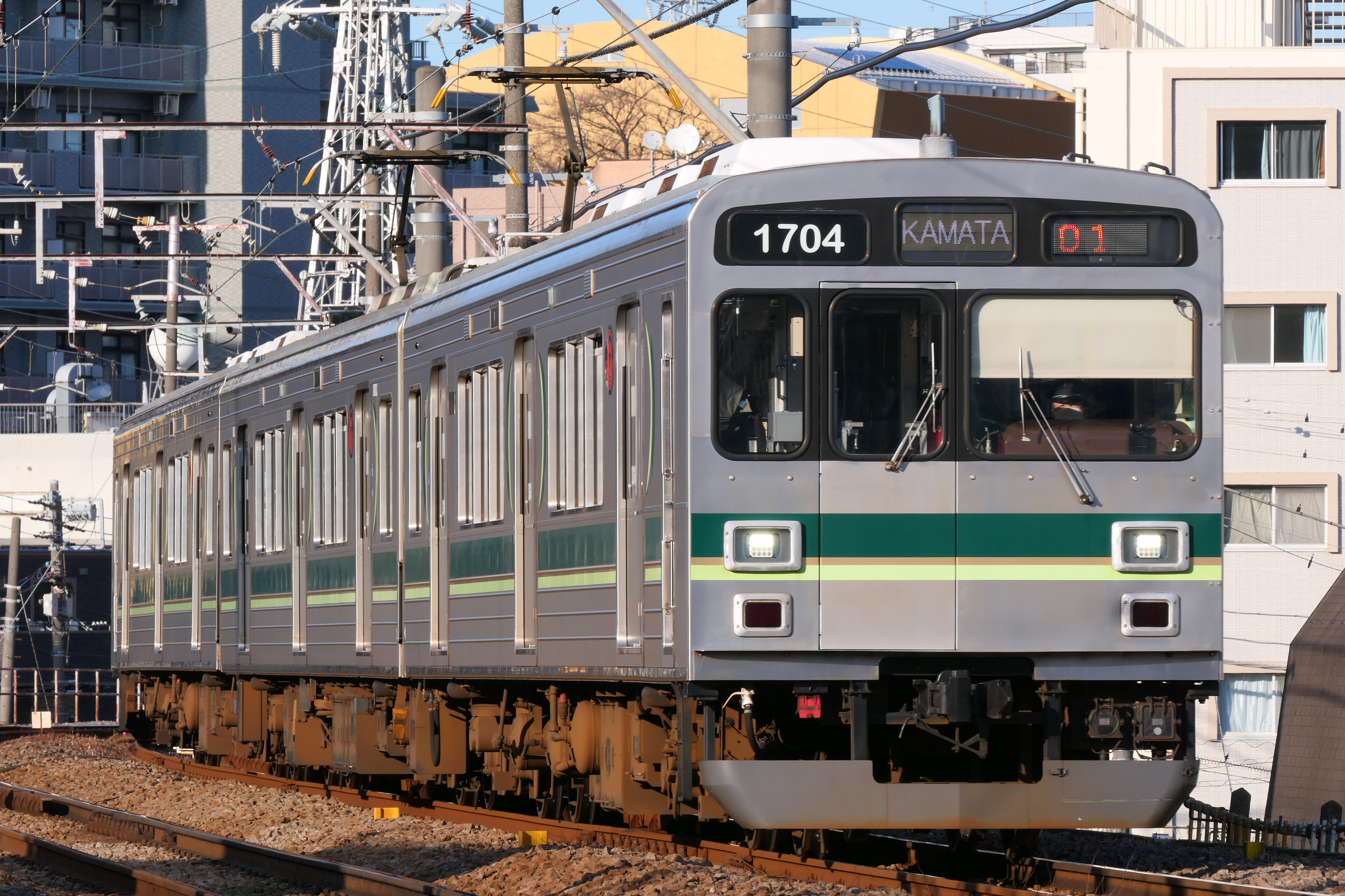
Set 1504 on the Ikegami Line in March 2021

The three-car 1000-1500 series sets are formed as shown below, with two motored ("M") cars and one non-powered trailer ("T") car.

Designation	Mc	M	Tc
Numbering	1500	1600	1700
Weight (t)	33.4	34.7	28.9
Capacity (Total)	125	135	125

- The 150x cars were converted from former 100x driving trailer cars, the 160x cars were converted from former 120x motor cars, and the 170x cars were converted from former 110x driving trailer cars.
- The 160x cars are fitted with two single-arm pantographs.
- The motor cars are mounted on TS-1006 bogies, and the trailer cars are mounted on TS-1007 bogies.

=== 8-car sets ===
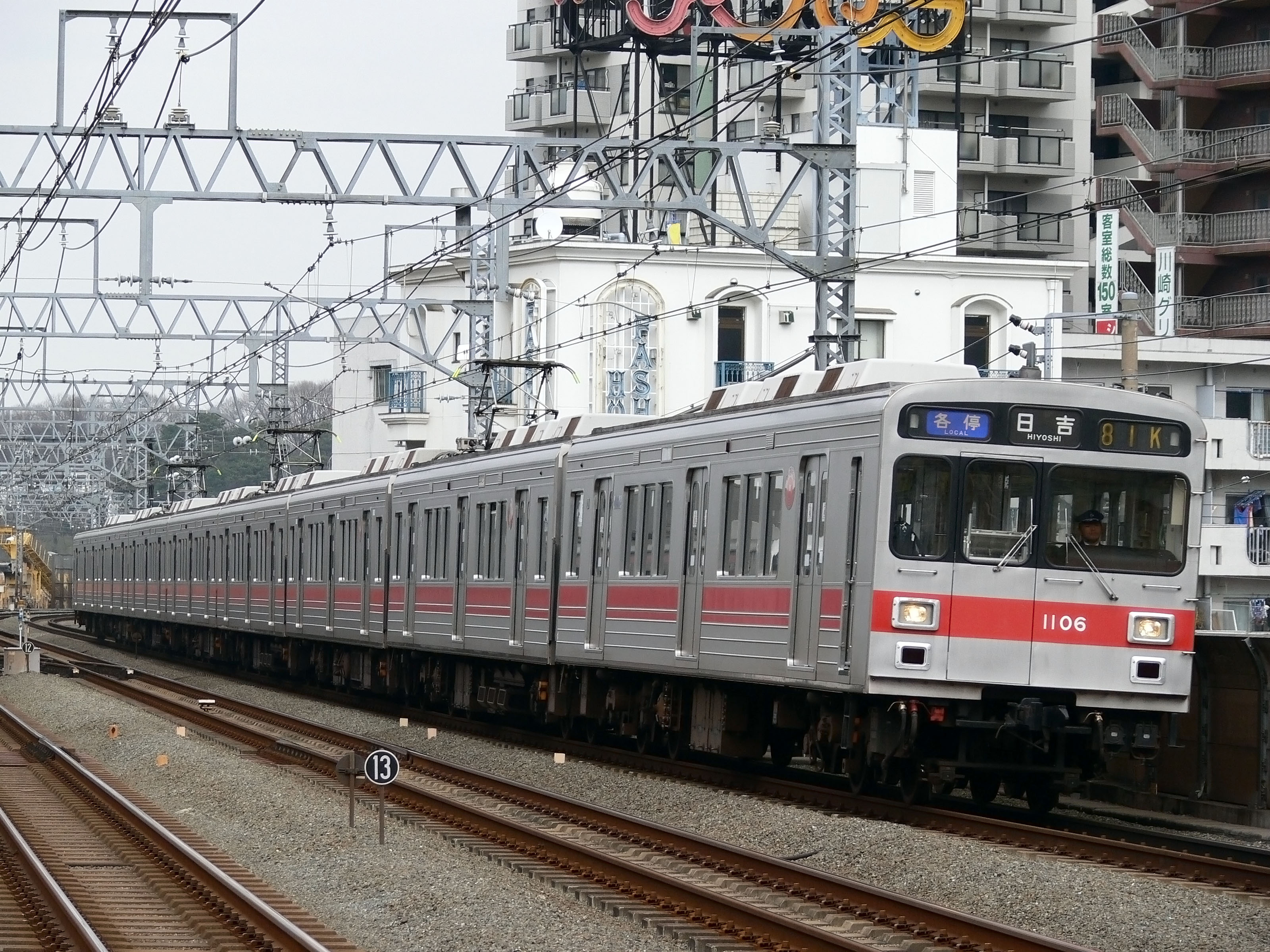
An 8-car set on the Toyoko Line in February 2007

The eight-car sets used on the Toyoko Line up until March 2013 were formed as follows, with car 1 at the northern end.

Car No.	1	2	3	4	5	6	7	8
Designation	Tc2	M2	M1	M2	M1	M2	M1	Tc1
Numbering	1000	1250	1200	1350	1300	1450	1400	1100

Cars 3, 5, and 7 were each fitted with a lozenge-type pantograph. Cars 2 and 7 included wheelchair spaces.

== Interior ==
Passenger accommodation consists of longitudinal seating throughout, with a mixture of brown and orange seat moquette. The 1000-1500 series sets formed from 2014 have light green seat moquette and a wheelchair space added in the 160x cars.

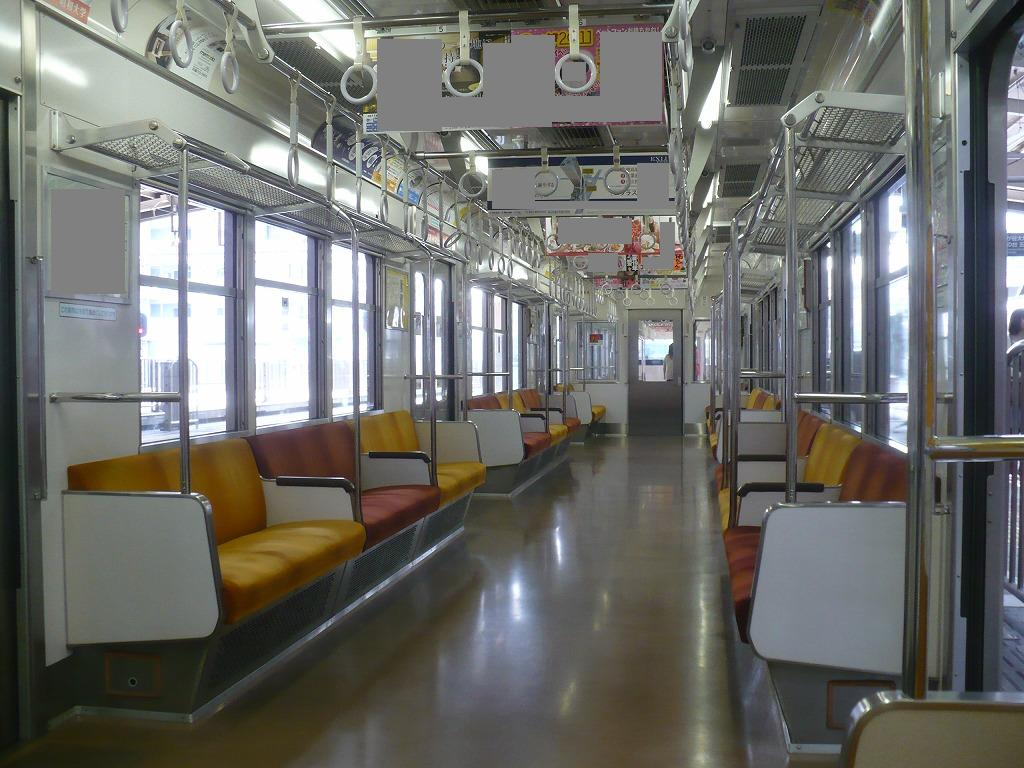
Interior view

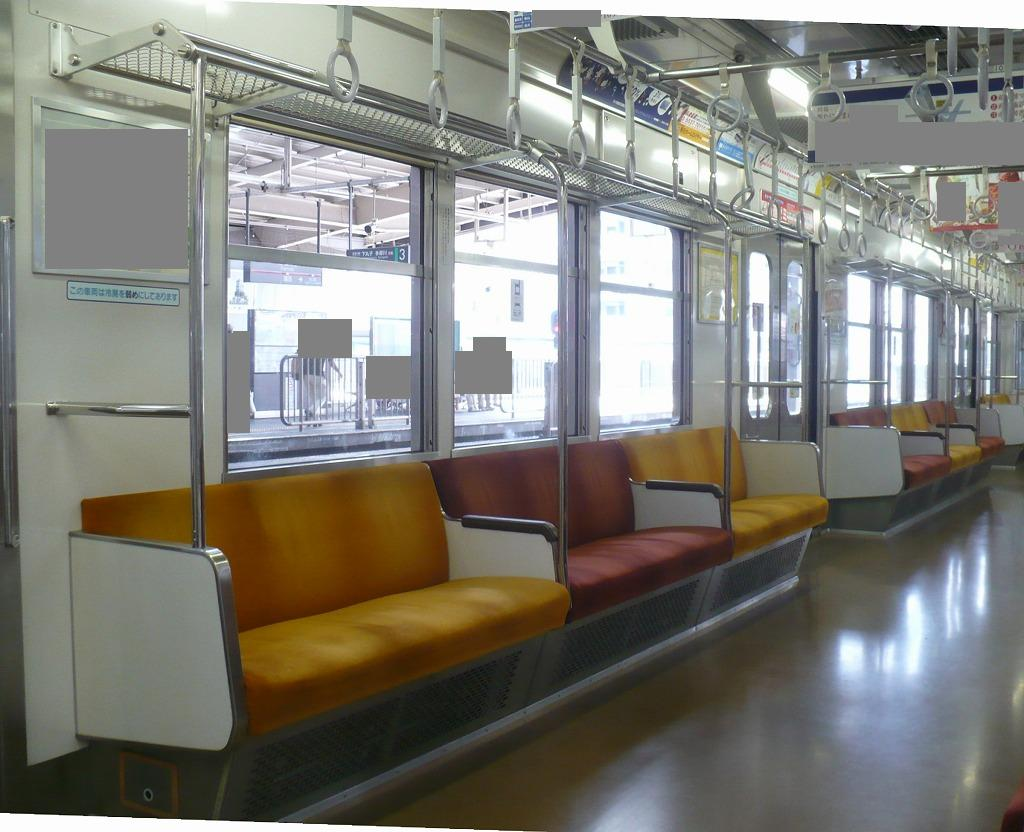
Longitudinal seat

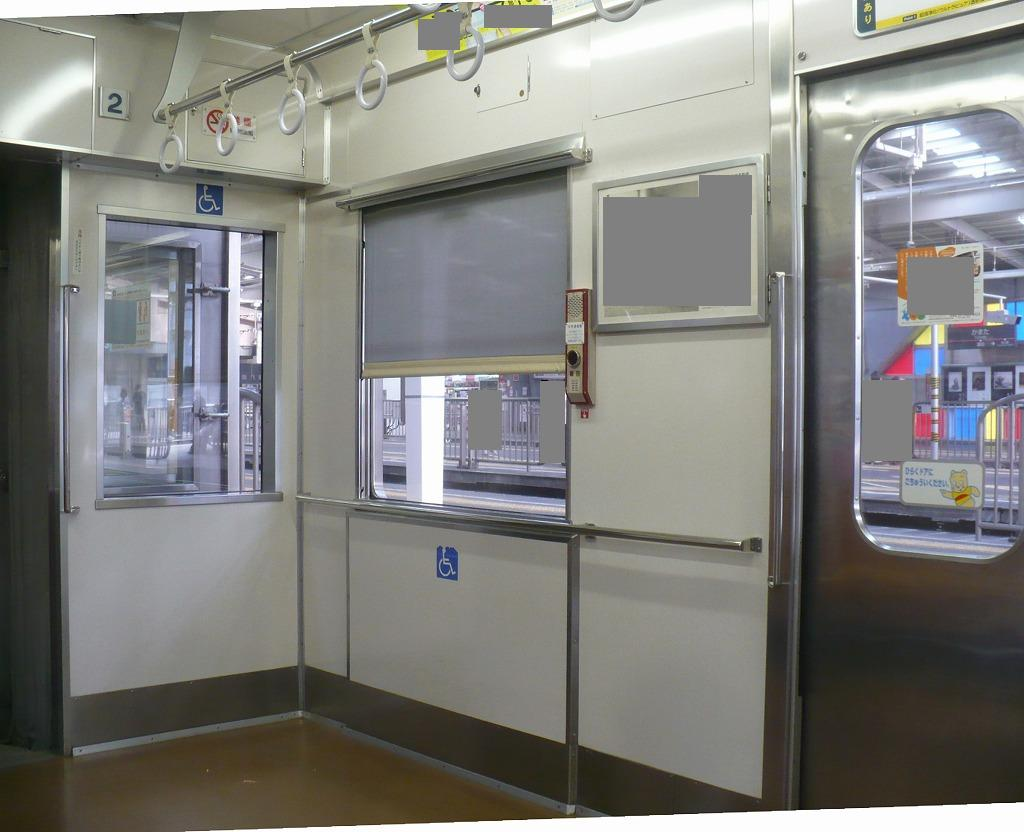
Wheelchair space

== History ==
Initially introduced on the Tokyu Toyoko Line from 26 December 1988, they were also introduced on the Mekama Line from 1991. These were transferred to the Ikegami Line from 1992, and further new trains were built for the Ikegami Line in 1993. The last set delivered, 1024, was the first Tokyu EMU to be built with a wheelchair space. The Ikegami Line fleet underwent modifications in 1998 for use on wanman driver only operation services.

== Livery variations ==
From March 2016, three-car set 1017 received a dark blue and yellow retro-style livery based on the livery applied to the 3450 series trains that operated on the Ikegami Line until 1989.

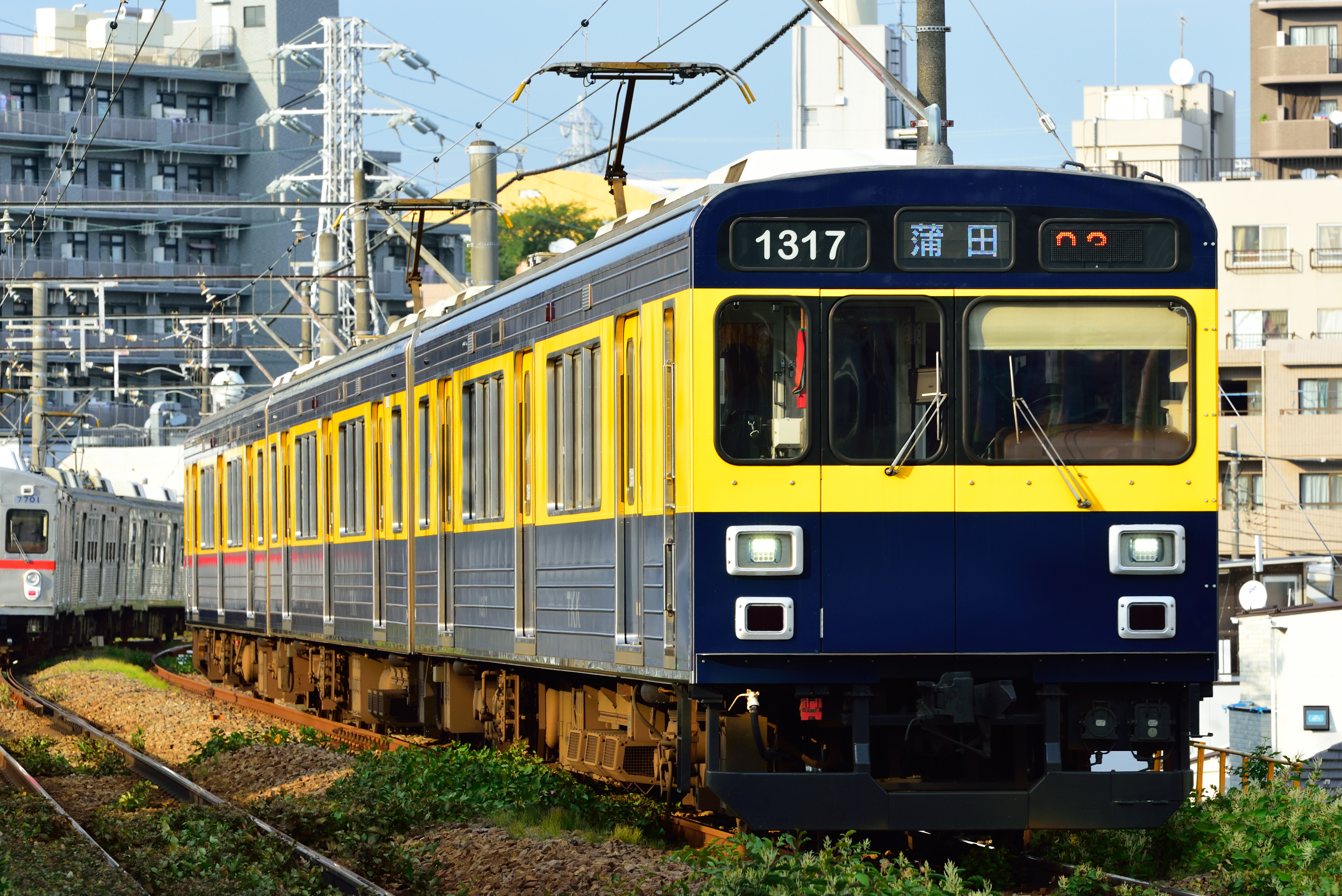
Set 1017 in September 2016

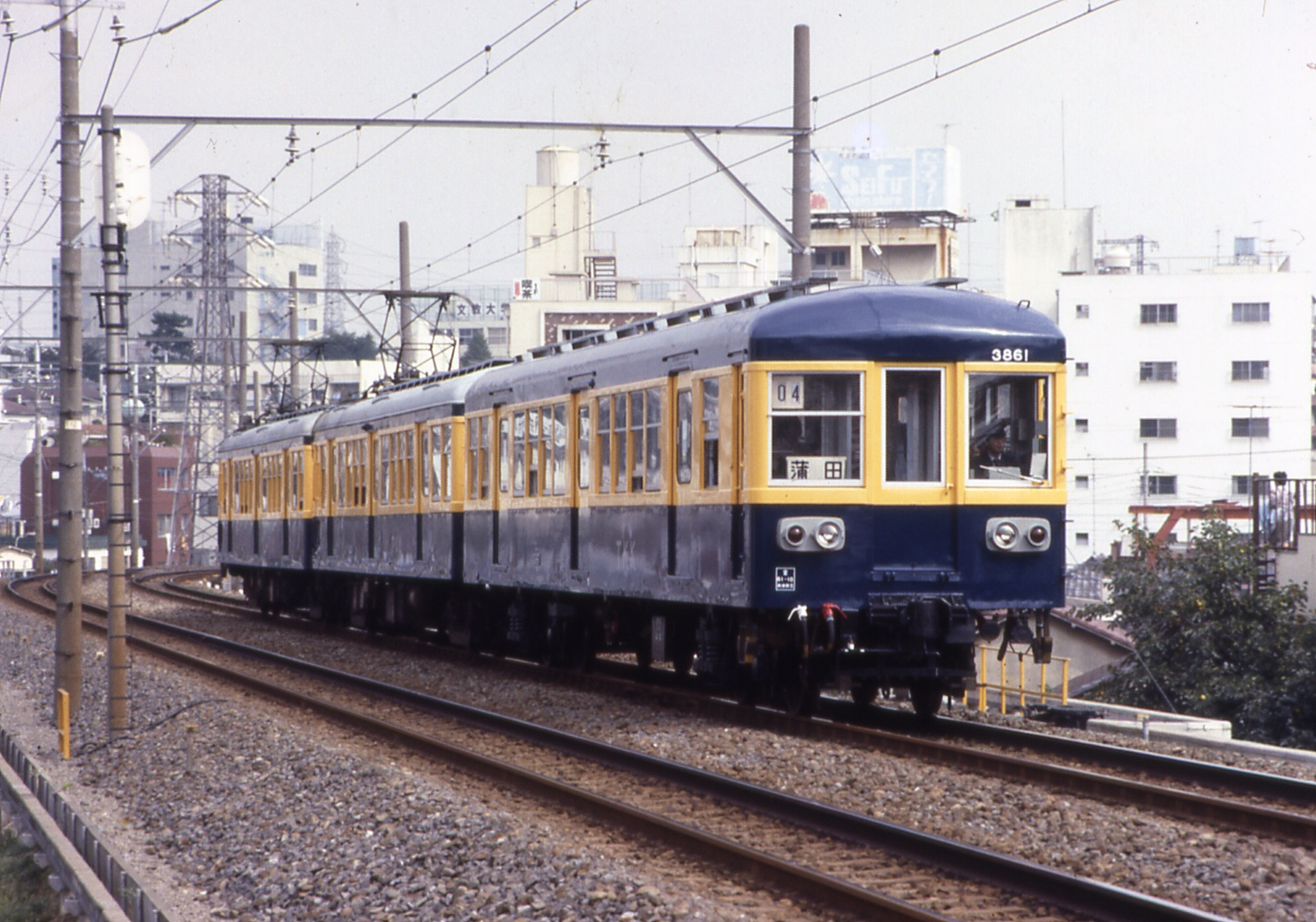
A 3450 series train in blue and yellow livery in August 1983

== Withdrawal and resale ==
Withdrawals started in 2008, with some cars being resold to the Ueda Electric Railway and the Iga Railway. Further cars were resold to the Ichibata Electric Railway in 2014, and to Fukushima Transportation in 2017.

- Ueda Electric Railway 1000 series and 6000 series
- Iga Railway 200 series
- Ichibata Electric Railway 1000 series two-car sets (since February 2015)
- Fukushima Transportation 1000 series two- and three-car sets (since 2017)

=== Ueda Electric Railway ===
Eight former Tokyu Ikegami Line 1000 series end cars were resold to the Ueda Electric Railway in Nagano Prefecture, and reformed as four two-car 1000 series sets.

In 2015, two former Tokyu Toyoko Line 1000 series intermediate cars (DeHa 1255 and DeHa 1305) were resold to the Ueda Electric Railway, which were reformed as a two-car 6000 series set with the addition of new cab ends.

==== 1000 series formations ====
Designation	Mc	Tc
Numbering	DeHa 100x	KuHa 110x

==== 6000 series formation ====
Designation	Mc	Tc
Numbering	DeHa 6001x	KuHa 6101x

==== Car identities ====
The former identities of the fleet are as shown below.

Set No.	Car No.	Tokyu numbering
1001	DeHa 1001	DeHa 1315
1001	KuHa 1101	KuHa 1015
1002	DeHa 1002	DeHa 1318
1002	KuHa 1102	KuHa 1018
1003	DeHa 1003	DeHa 1314
1003	KuHa 1103	KuHa 1014
1004	DeHa 1004	DeHa 1316
1004	KuHa 1104	KuHa 1016
6001	DeHa 6001	DeHa 1305
6001	KuHa 6101	DeHa 1255

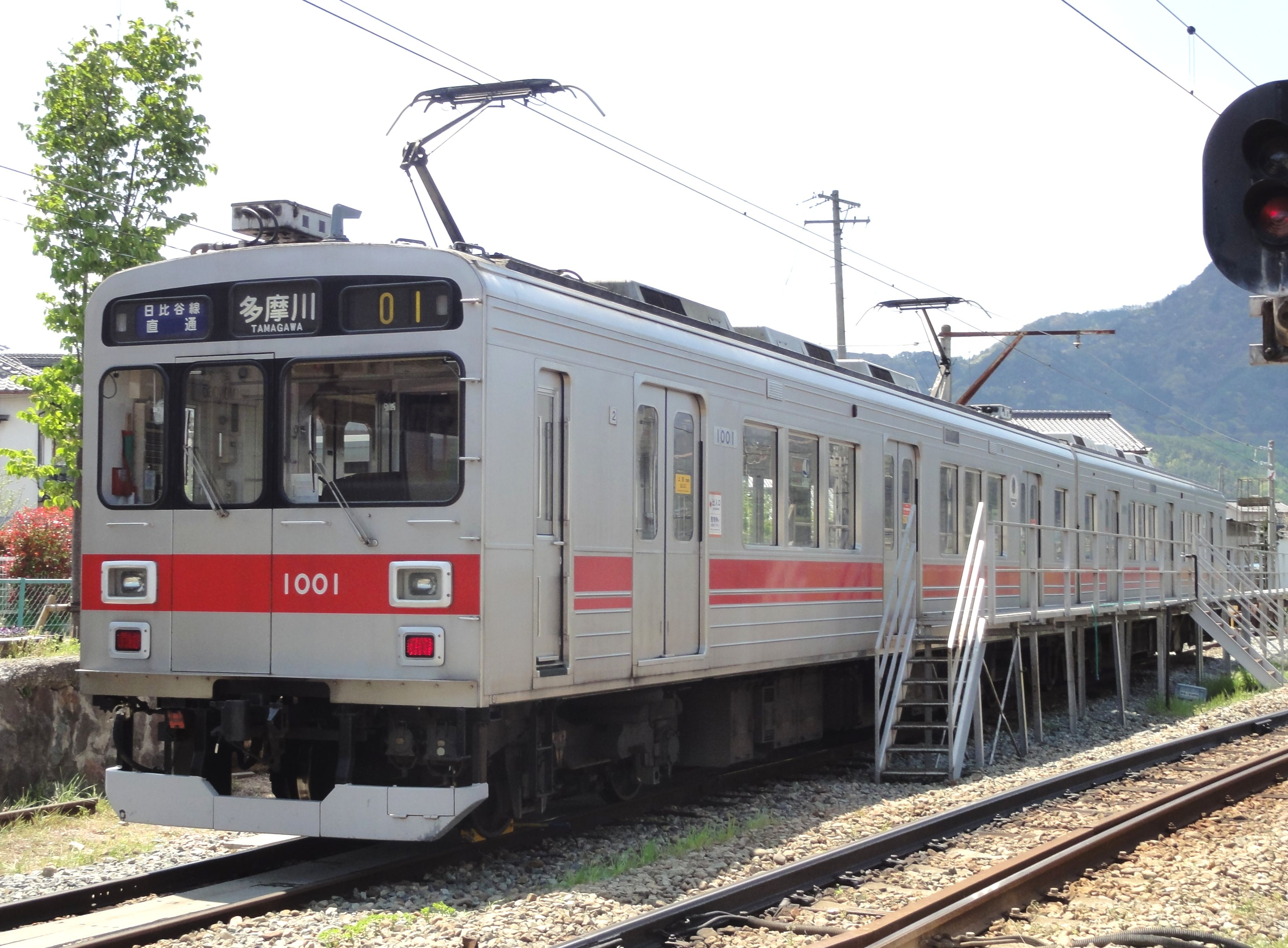
Ueda 1000 series set 1001 in May 2012

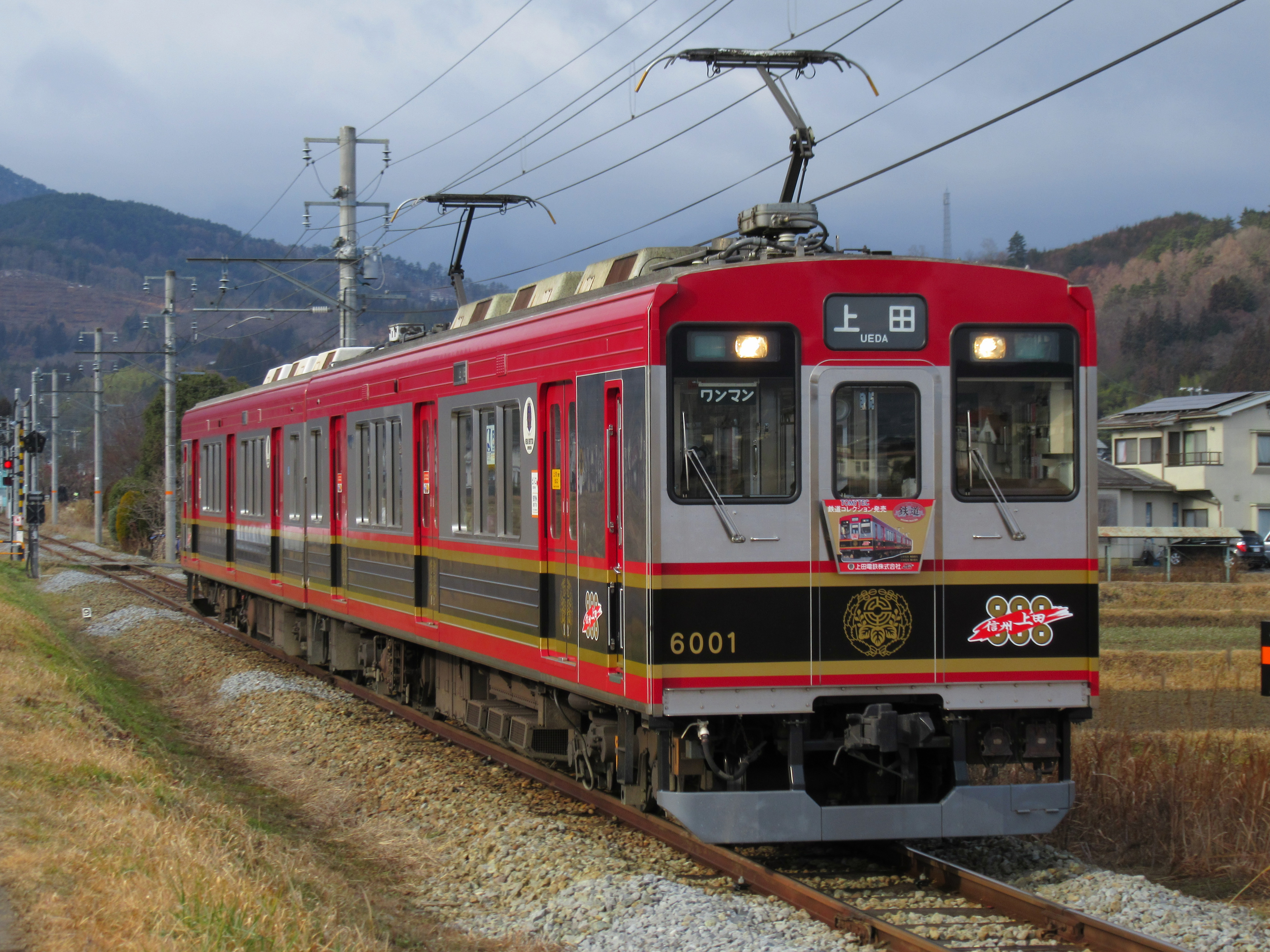
Ueda 6000 series set 6001 in January 2017

=== Iga Railway ===
The Iga Railway in Mie Prefecture operates five two-car 200 series EMUs formed from ten former Tokyu 1000 series cars (from former sets 1010, 1011, and 1006) purchased between 2009 and 2012.

The two end cars from the former eight-car set reformed from two four-car sets 1010 and 1011 were resold to the Iga Railway in 2009 after the set was withdrawn. The six intermediate cars of the set were scrapped. The two intermediate driving cars (with central gangway doors) originally formed in sets 1010 and 1011 before they were combined to become a single eight-car set were also sold to Iga Railway in 2010. Following its withdrawal in June 2009, eight-car set 1006 donated six cars, which were resold to Iga Railway between 2010 and 2012. The other two cars of the set were scrapped.

==== Formations ====
Designation	Mc	Tc
Numbering	Mo 20x	Ku 10x

==== Car identities ====
The former identities of the fleet are as shown below.

Set No.	Car No.	Tokyu numbering
201	Mo 201	DeHa 1311
201	Ku 101	KuHa 1010
202	Mo 202	DeHa 1310
202	Ku 102	KuHa 1011
203	Mo 203	DeHa 1406
203	Ku 103	KuHa 1106
204	Mo 204	DeHa 1206
204	Ku 104	KuHa 1006
205	Mo 205	DeHa 1306
205	Ku 105	DeHa 1356

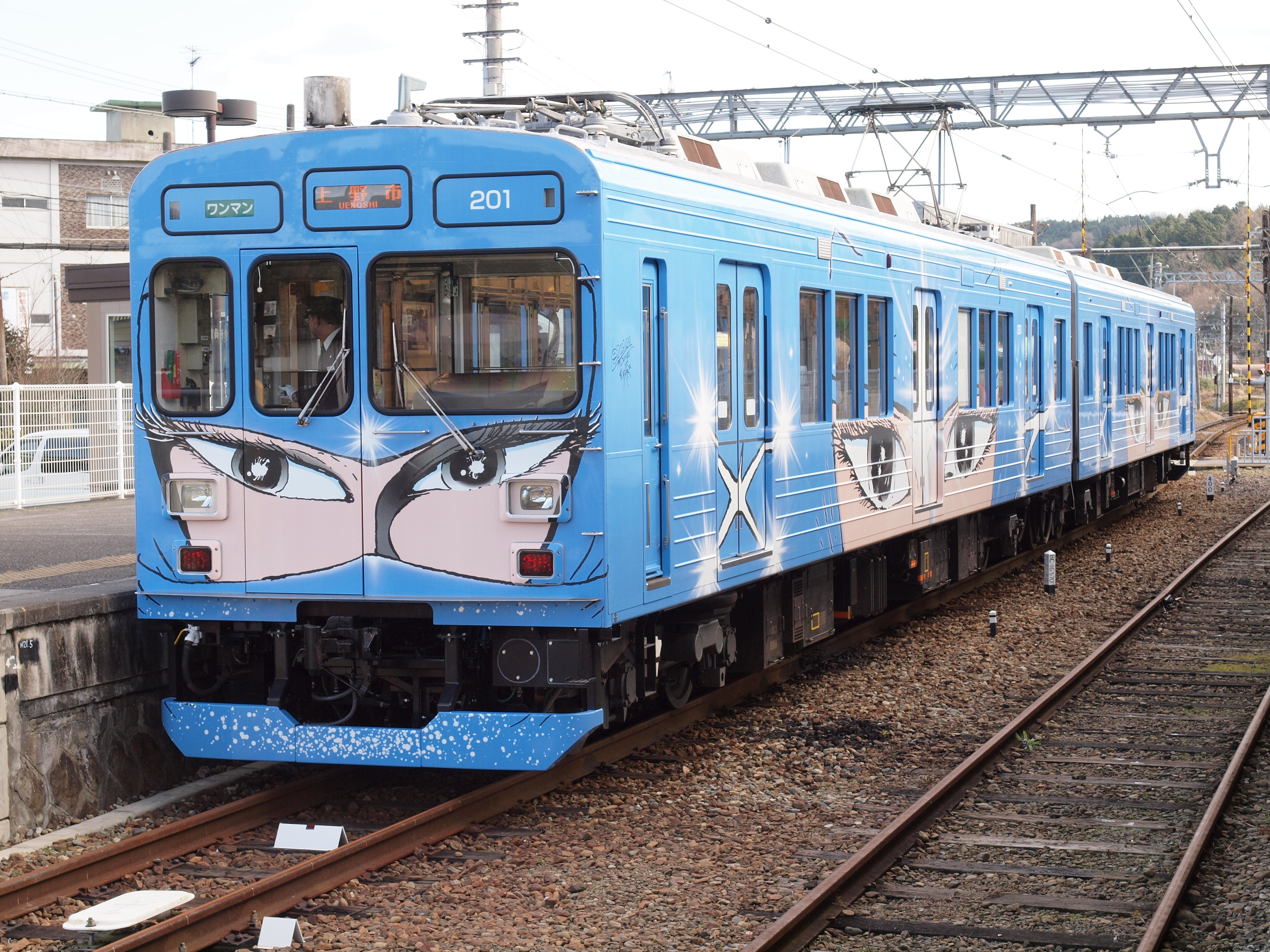
Iga Railway 200 series 2-car set 201 in December 2009, with original Tokyu cab and offset gangway door

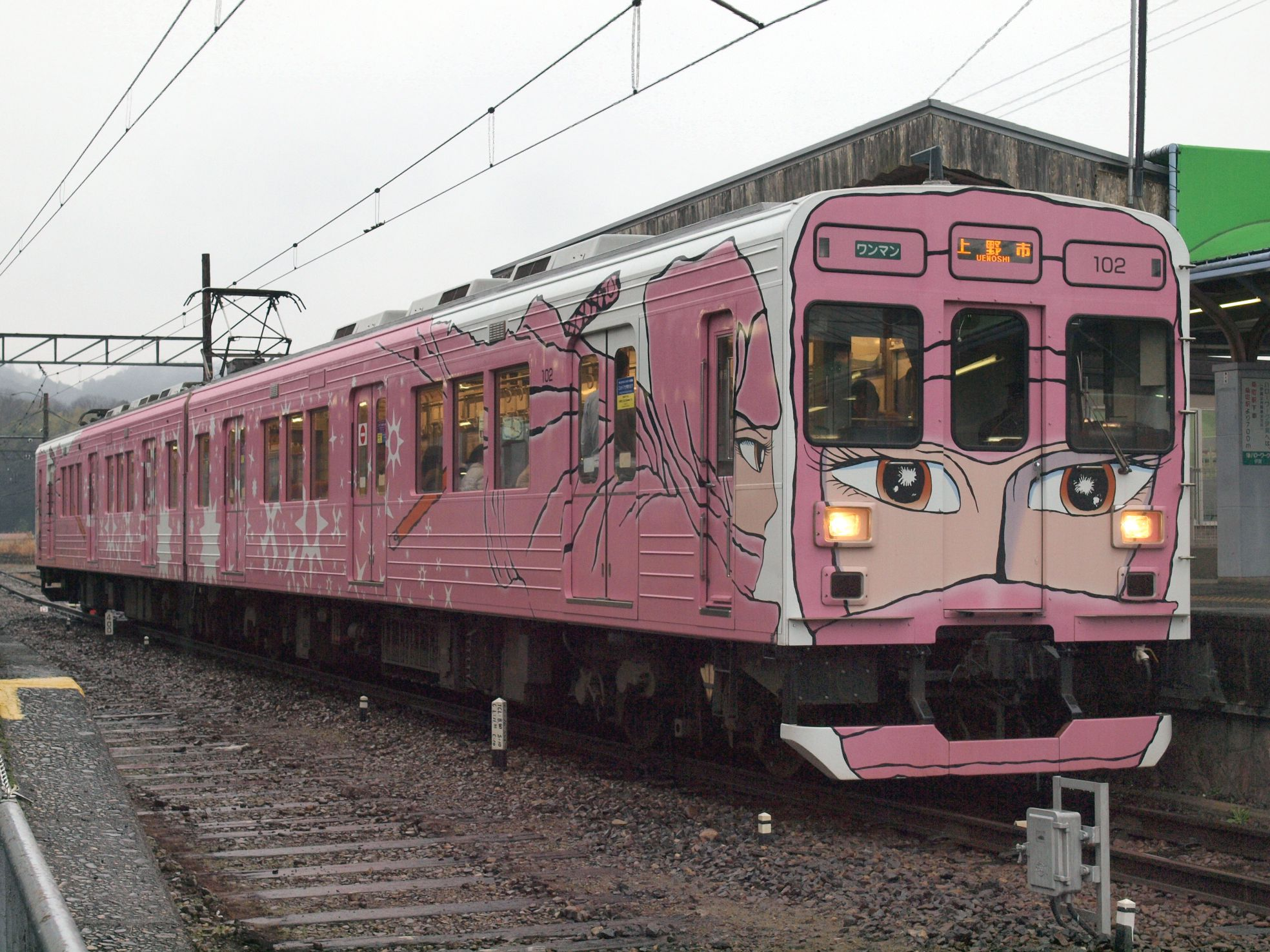
Iga Railway 200 series 2-car set 202 in December 2010, with original Tokyu cab and central gangway door

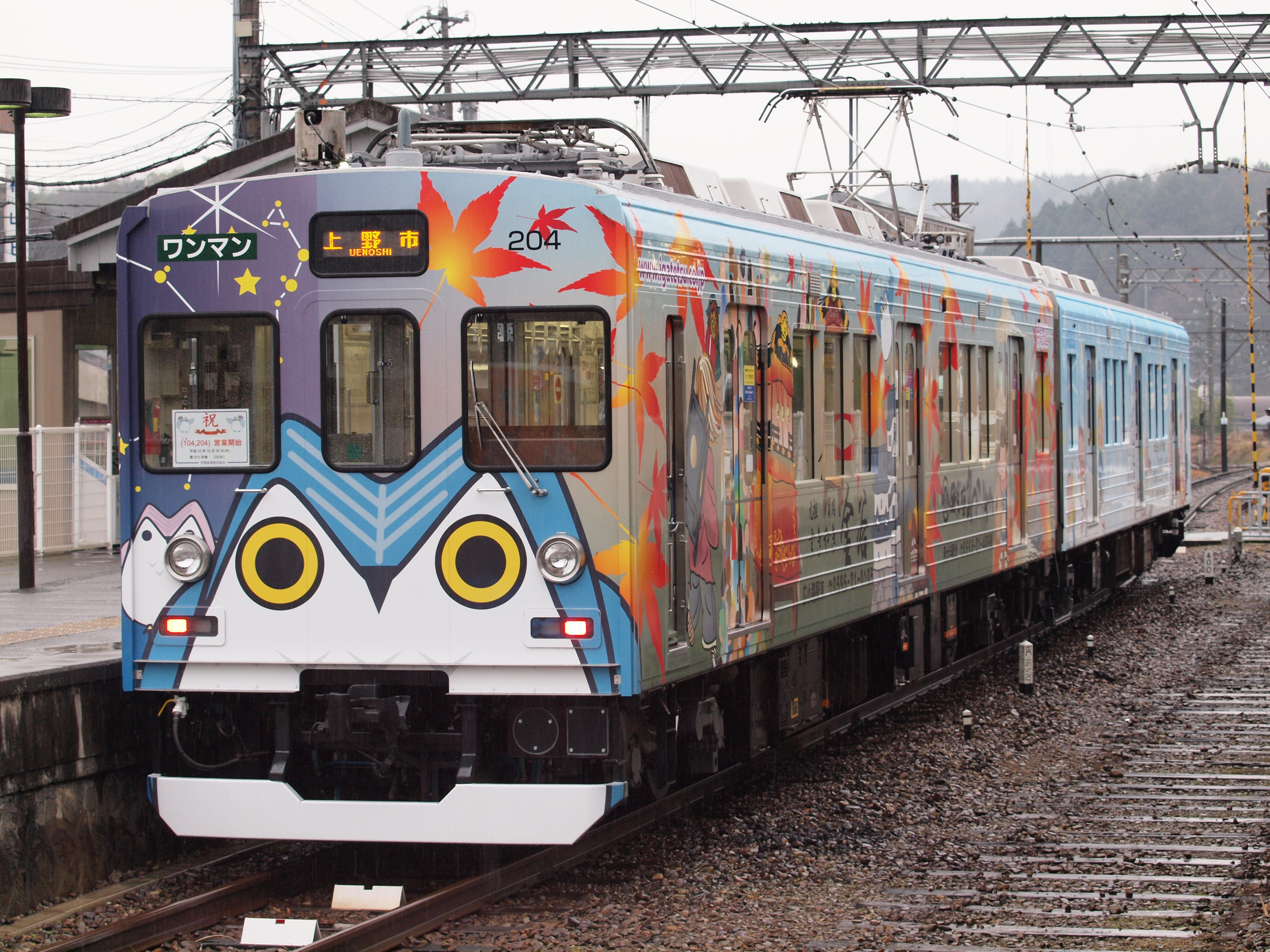
Iga Railway 200 series 2-car set 204 in December 2010, with retro-fitted cab end

=== Ichibata Electric Railway ===
In 2014, four former 1000 series intermediate cars (1453, 1403, 1455, and 1405) were resold to the Ichibata Electric Railway in Shimane Prefecture, which were reformed as two-car 1000 series sets with the addition of new cab ends. These entered service on 9 February 2015.

==== Formations ====
Designation	Mc	Tc
Numbering	DeHa 100x	KuHa 110x

==== Car identities ====
The former identities of the fleet are as shown below.

Set No.	Car No.	Tokyu numbering
1001	DeHa 1001	DeHa 1405
1001	KuHa 1101	DeHa 1455
1002	DeHa 1002	DeHa 1403
1002	KuHa 1102	DeHa 1453

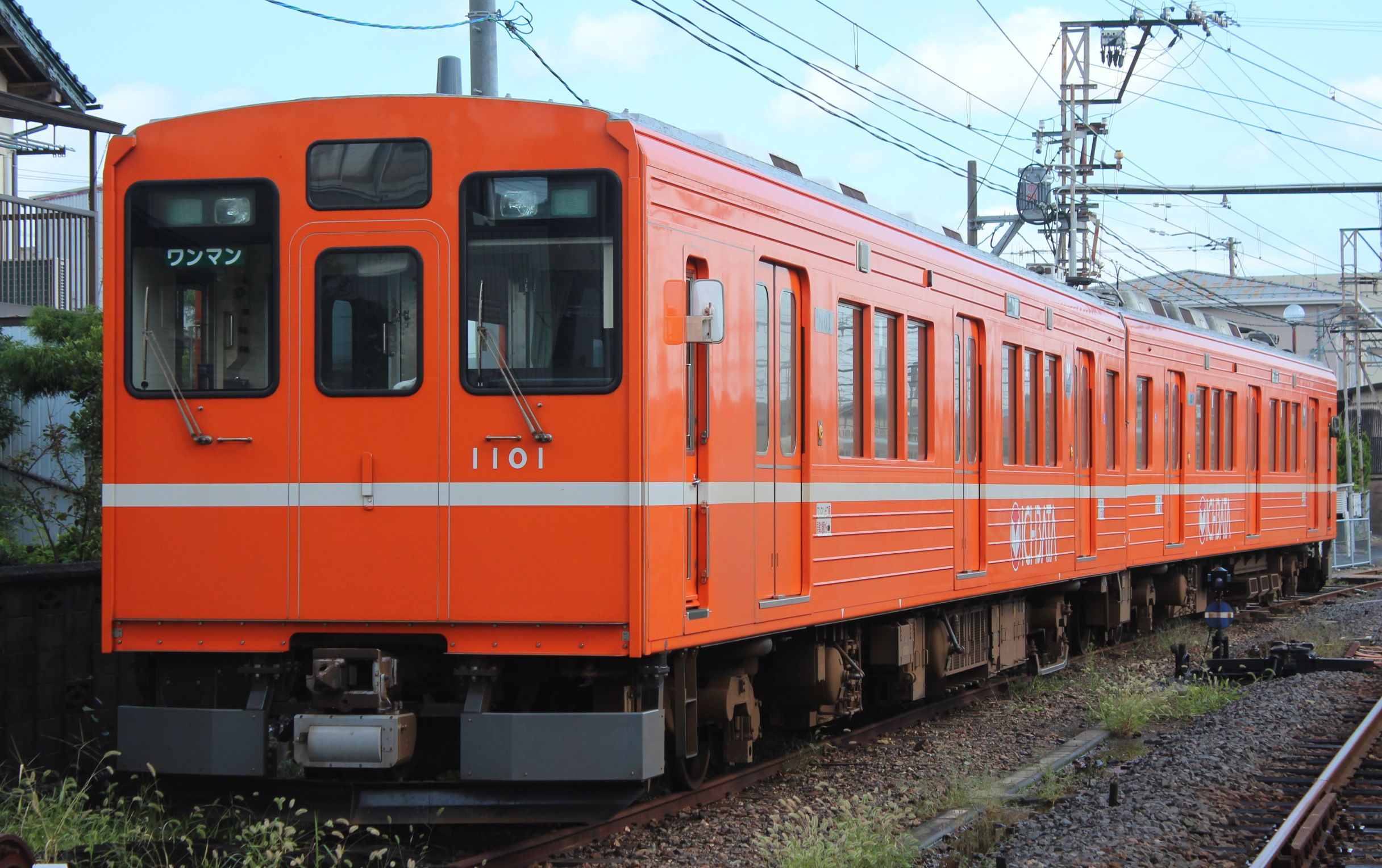
Ichibata 1000 series set 1001 in September 2015

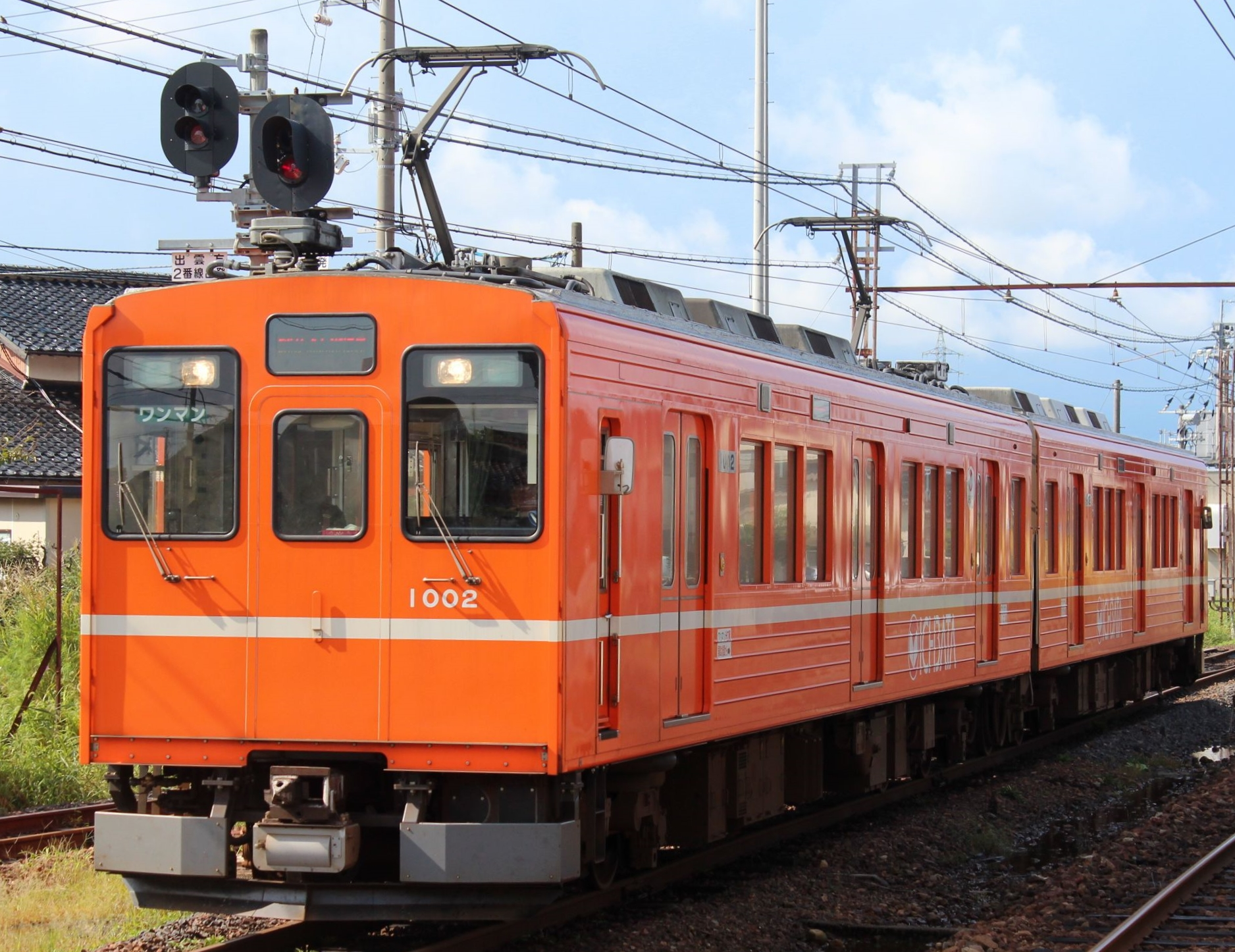
Ichibata 1000 series set 1002 in September 2015

=== Fukushima Transportation ===
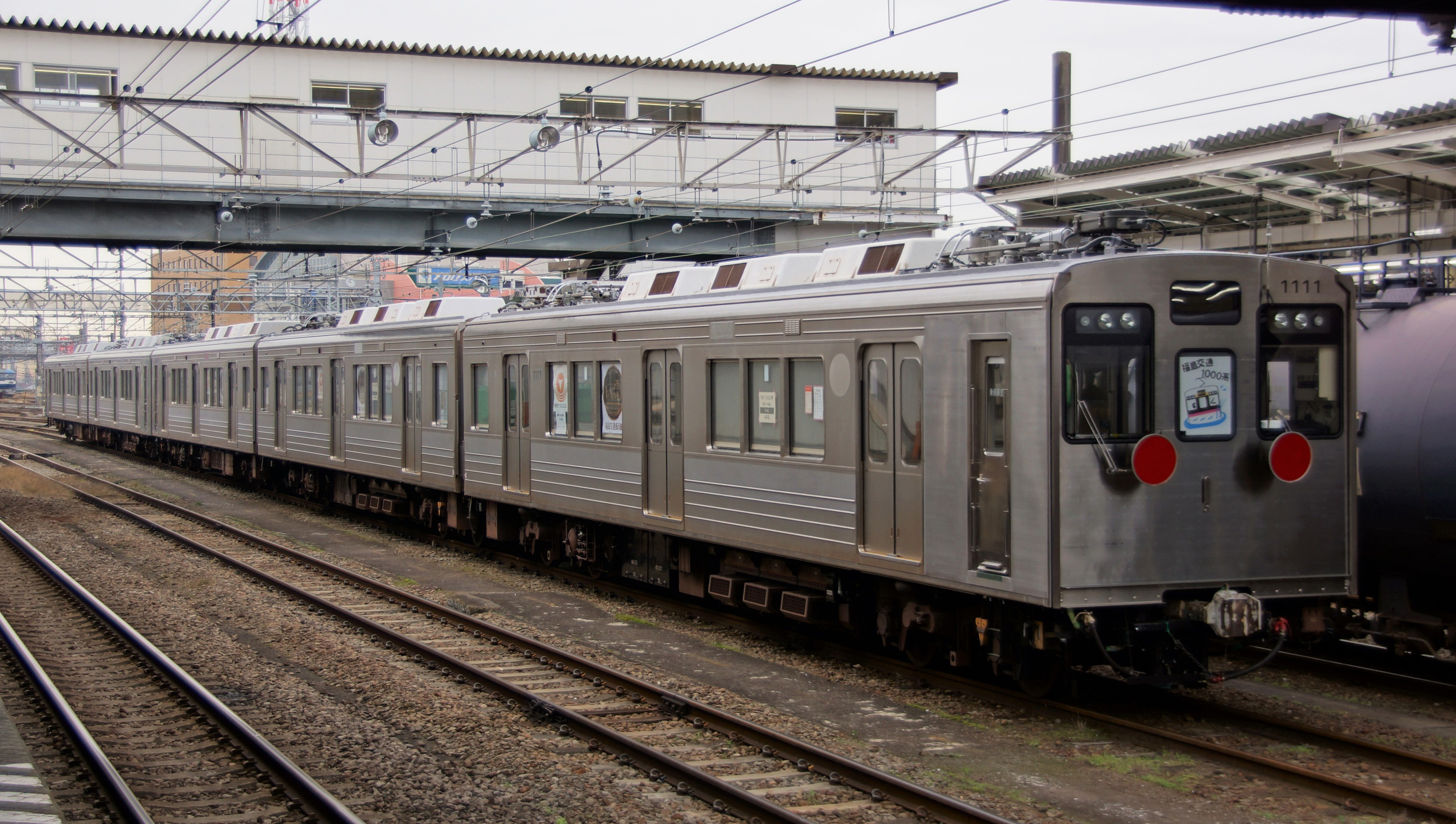
3-car set 1111 and 2-car set 1103 on delivery from Tokyu in November 2017

In 2017, a number of former 1000 series cars were resold to Fukushima Transportation in Fukushima Prefecture for use on the Fukushima Kōtsū Iizaka Line. Classified as 1000 series, the trains are formed as two- and three-car sets as follows. Two sets (one two-car and one three-car set) were converted in fiscal 2016, entering service on 1 April 2017. Two more sets (one two-car and one three-car set) are scheduled to be introduced during fiscal 2017, followed by two more two-car sets in fiscal 2018, ultimately replacing the entire fleet of 7000 trainsets.

==== Two-car sets ====
Designation	Mc	Tc
Numbering	DeHa 11xx	KuHa 12xx

==== Three-car sets ====
Designation	Mc	M	Tc
Numbering	DeHa 11xx	DeHa 13xx	KuHa 12xx

==== Car identities ====
The former identities of the fleet are as shown below.

Set No.	Car No.	Tokyu numbering
1107	DeHa 1107	DeHa 1307
1107	KuHa 1208	DeHa 1257
1109	DeHa 1109	DeHa 1308
1109	DeHa 1313	DeHa 1408
1109	KuHa 1210	DeHa 1258
