= Iga Railway Iga Line =

Railway line in Mie prefecture, Japan

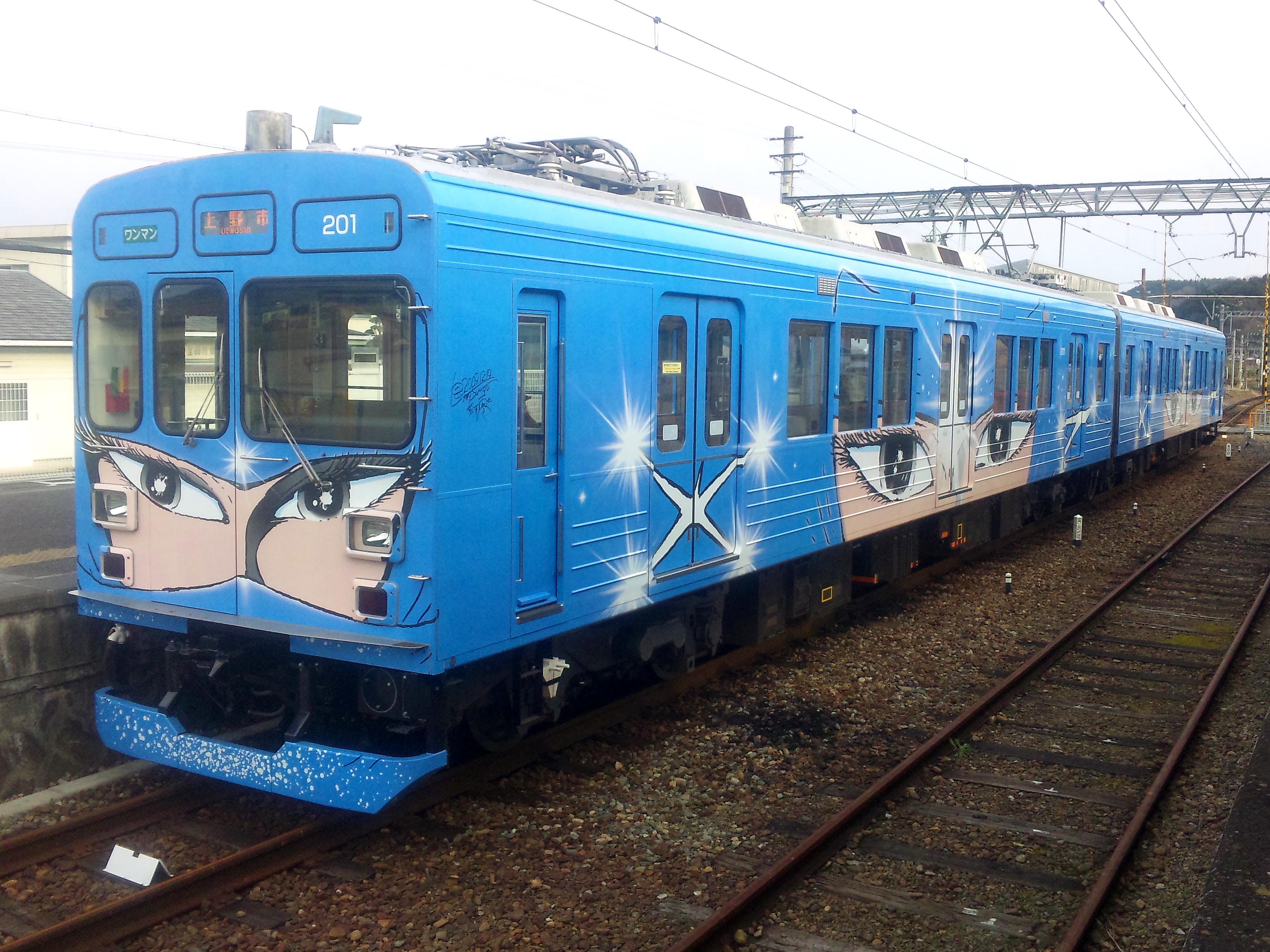
- Iga Railway Line 200 series

Overview
- Other name: Ninja Line
- Native name: 伊賀鉄道伊賀線
- Owner: Iga City
- Locale: Mie
- Termini: Iga-Ueno; Iga-Kambe
- Stations: 15

Service
- Type: Regional rail
- Operator(s): Iga Railway

Technical
- Line length: 16.6 km (10.3 mi)
- Track gauge: 1,067 mm (3 ft 6 in)
- Electrification: 1,500 V DC overhead catenary
- Operating speed: 65 km/h (40 mph)
Route map

The Iga Line (伊賀線, Iga-sen) is a railway line in Iga, Mie, Japan, operated by the third-sector railway operator Iga Railway Co., Ltd. (伊賀鉄道株式会社, Iga-tetsudō kabushiki-gaisha). The line connects Iga-Ueno Station with Iga-Kambe Station. The track and trains are owned by Iga City (as a Category 3 railway operator), while the trains are operated by Iga Railway (as a Category 2 railway operator). The line is also referred to as the Ninja Line (忍者線), with trains featuring a ninja-style livery.

Prior to 1 October 2007, the Iga Line was owned and operated by Kintetsu Railway. On 1 October 2007, operation of the line was transferred to Iga Railway, with Kintetsu Railway retaining ownership of the line. On 4 April 2017, the Iga Line became a third-sector railway with Iga City replacing Kintetsu Railway as the Category 3 railway operator.

== Stations ==
All stations are in Iga, Mie.

Station name	Japanese	Distance (km between stations)	Distance (km)	Transfers
Iga-Ueno	伊賀上野	-	0.0	Kansai Main Line
Nii	新居	0.8	0.8	
Nishi-Ōte	西大手	2.5	3.3	
Uenoshi (Ninja City)	上野市（忍者市）	0.6	3.9	
Hirokōji	広小路	0.5	4.4	
Kayamachi	茅町	0.6	5.0	
Kuwamachi	桑町	0.8	5.8	
Shijuku	四十九	0.7	6.5	
Idamichi	猪田道	1.5	8.0	
Ichibe	市部	1.2	9.2	
Inako	依那古	1.4	10.6	
Maruyama	丸山	1.3	11.9	
Uebayashi	上林	1.1	13.0	
Hido	比土	2.6	15.6	
Iga-Kambe	伊賀神戸	1.0	16.6	Kintetsu Osaka Line

== Rolling stock ==
=== Current ===
- 200 series 2-car EMUs (ex-Tokyu 1000 series), since 24 December 2009

Iga Railway operates five 2-car 200 series EMUs formed from ten former Tokyu 1000 series cars purchased between 2009 and 2012.

==== Formations ====
Designation	Mc	Tc
Numbering	Mo 20x	Ku 10x

==== Car identities ====
The former identities of the fleet are as shown below.

Set No.	Car No.	Tokyu numbering
201	Mo 201	DeHa 1311
201	Ku 101	KuHa 1010
202	Mo 202	DeHa 1310
202	Ku 102	KuHa 1011
203	Mo 203	DeHa 1406
203	Ku 103	KuHa 1106
204	Mo 204	DeHa 1206
204	Ku 104	KuHa 1006
205	Mo 205	DeHa 1306
205	Ku 105	DeHa 1356

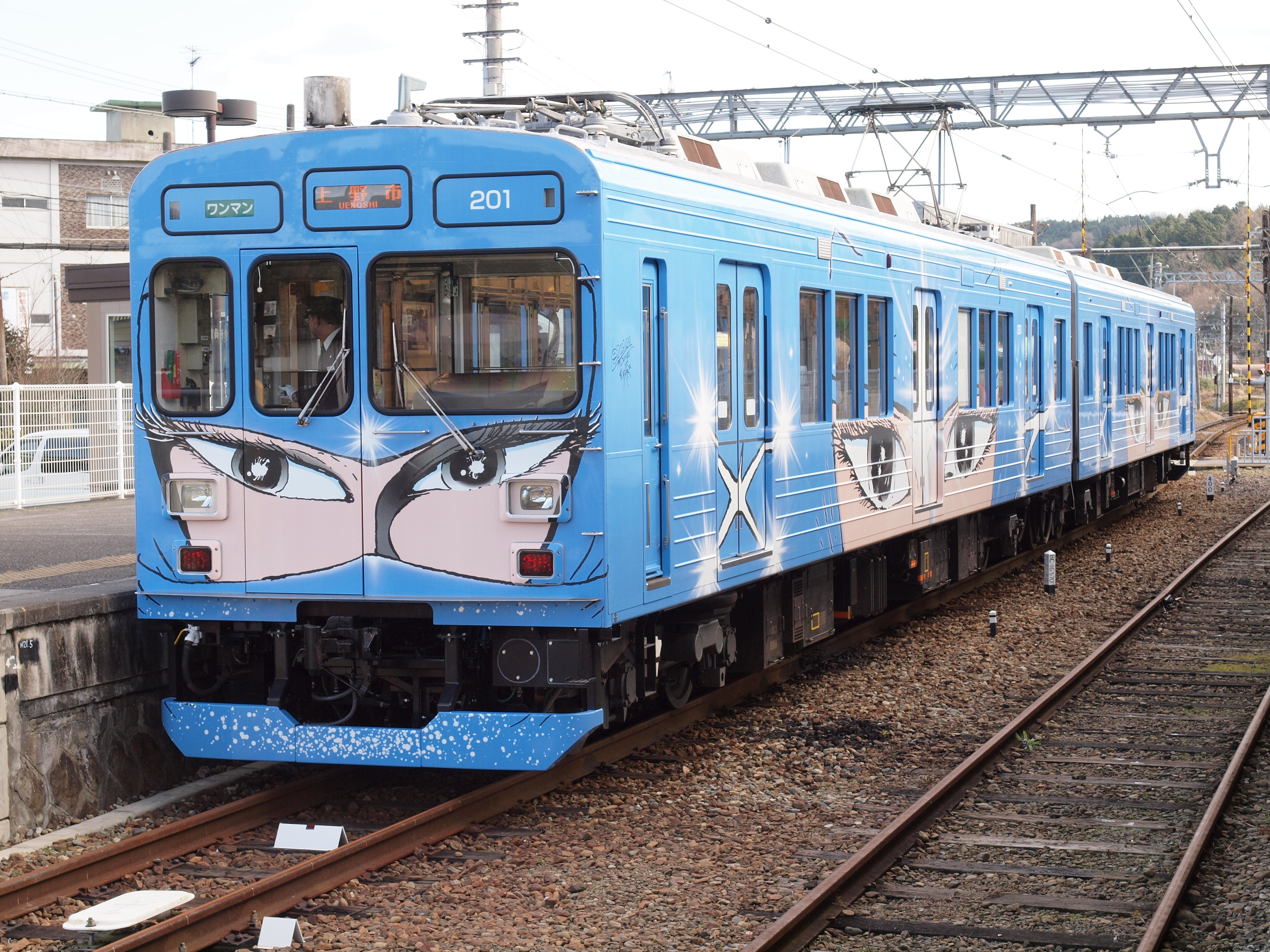
Iga Railway 200 series 2-car set 201 in December 2009, with original Tokyu cab and offset gangway door

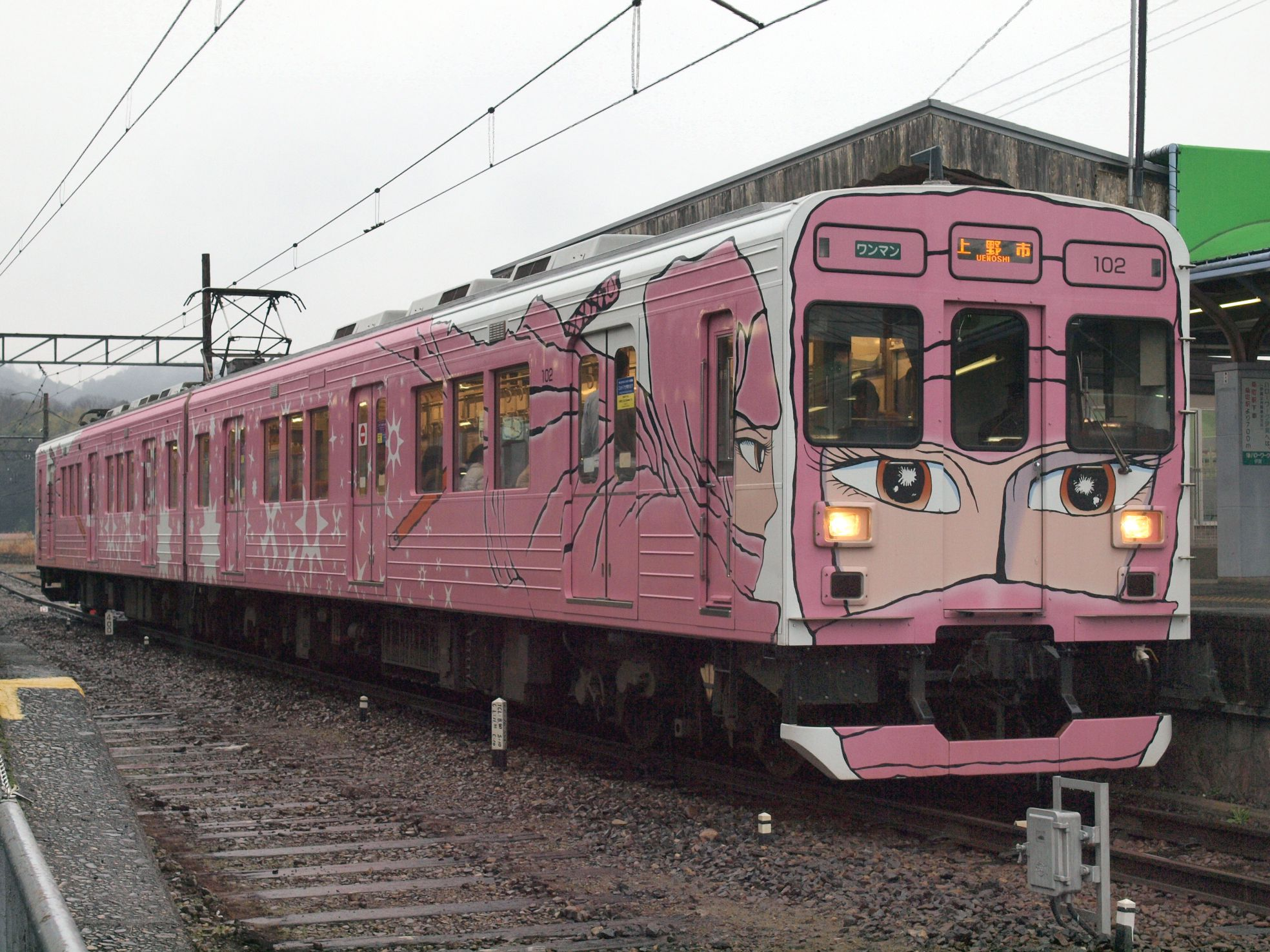
Iga Railway 200 series 2-car set 202 in December 2010, with original Tokyu cab and central gangway door

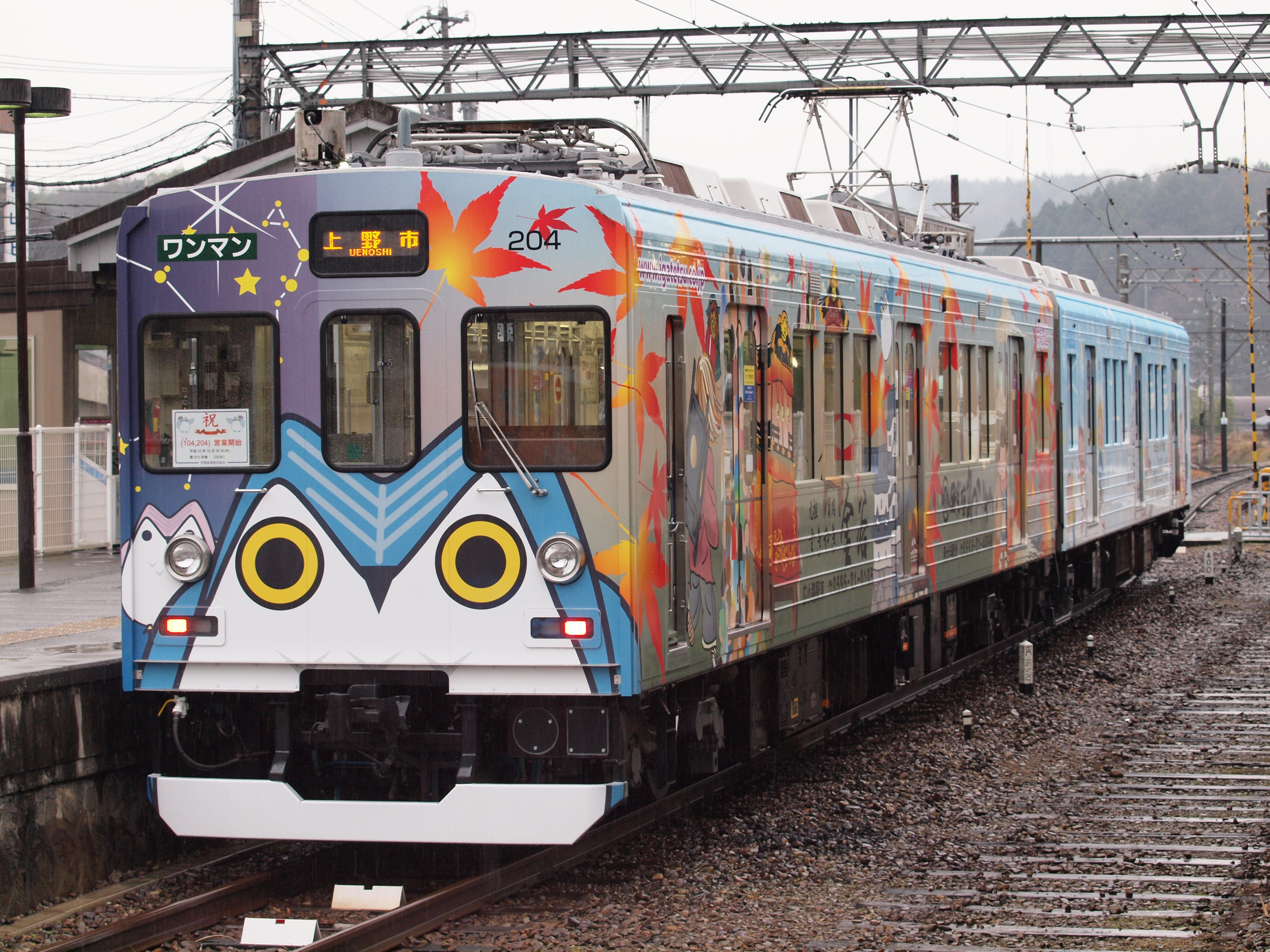
Iga Railway 200 series 2-car set 204 in December 2010, with retro-fitted cab end

=== Former ===
- Kintetsu Railway 860 series 2-car EMUs

== History ==
The original Iga Railway opened the 26 km 1,067 mm gauge line between Iga-Ueno on the Kansai Main Line and Nishi-Nabari on 18 July 1922. The line was electrified at 600 V DC on 25 May 1926. The company merged with the Osaka Electric Railway on 31 March 1929.

The Iga-Kambe to Nishi-Nabari section closed in 1964.

Prior to 1 October 2007, the Iga Line was owned and operated by Kintetsu Railway.

Operation of the line was transferred to the (new) Iga Railway on 1 October 2007. Kintetsu Railway retained ownership of the line.

In March 2015, it was announced that Kintetsu Railway, Iga City and Iga Railway had agreed to transition the Iga Line to a third-sector railway. This was implemented on 4 April 2017 with Iga City replacing Kintetsu Railway as the Category 3 railway operator.

From 9 March 2024, ICOCA and all other Nationwide Mutual Usage Service IC cards can be used at all stations on the Iga Line.
