= Hirokōji Station (Mie) =

Railway station in Iga, Mie Prefecture, Japan

Hirokōji Station 広小路駅
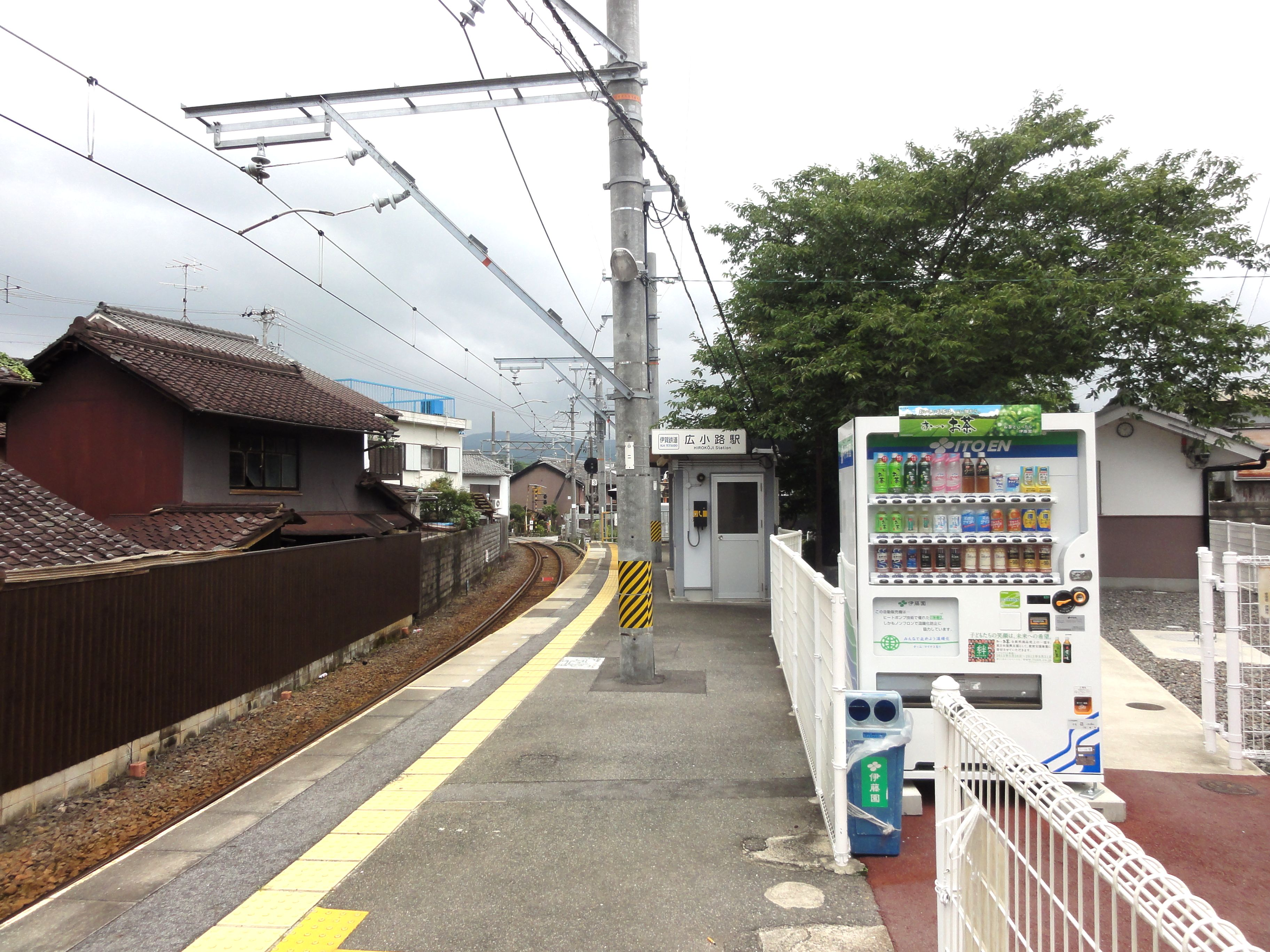
- Hirokōji Station in July 2012

General information
- Location: Ueno Nonin-cho, Iga-shi, Mie-ken 518-0872; Japan
- Coordinates: 34°46′01″N 136°08′04″E
- Operator: Iga Railway
- Line: ■ Iga Line
- Distance: 4.4 km from Iga-Ueno
- Platforms: 1 side platform

Other information
- Website: Official website

History
- Opened: July 18, 1922

Passengers
- FY2019: 47 daily
Location
- Location within Mie Prefecture Location within Japan

Hirokōji Station (広小路駅, Hirokōji-eki) is a passenger railway station in located in the city of Iga, Mie Prefecture, Japan, operated by the private railway operator Iga Railway.

== Lines ==
Hirokōji Station is served by the Iga Line, and is located 4.4 rail kilometers from the starting point of the line at Iga-Ueno Station.

== Station layout ==
The station consists of a single side platform serving bidirectional traffic. The station is unattended and has no station building. The platform is short and can only handle trains of two cars in length.

== Platform ==
1	■ Iga Line	For Iga-Ueno; For Iga-Kambe

== Adjacent stations ==
«	Service	»
Iga Line
Uenoshi	-	Kayamachi

== History ==
Hirokōji Station was opened on July 18, 1922. Through a series of mergers, the Iga Line became part of the Kintetsu network by June 1, 1944, but was spun out as an independent company in October 2007. The station was closed on June 1, 1945, but was reopened on March 15, 1946. The station has been unattended since March 15, 2000 and the station building was removed on August 27, 2007.

== Passenger statistics ==
In fiscal 2019, the station was used by an average of 47 passengers daily (boarding passengers only).

== Surrounding area ==
- Iga Kaido
- Matsuo Basho House
- Sugawara Shrine
- Igashi Ueno Library

== See also ==
- List of railway stations in Japan
