= Uenoshi Station =

Railway station in Iga, Mie Prefecture, Japan

Uenoshi Station 上野市駅
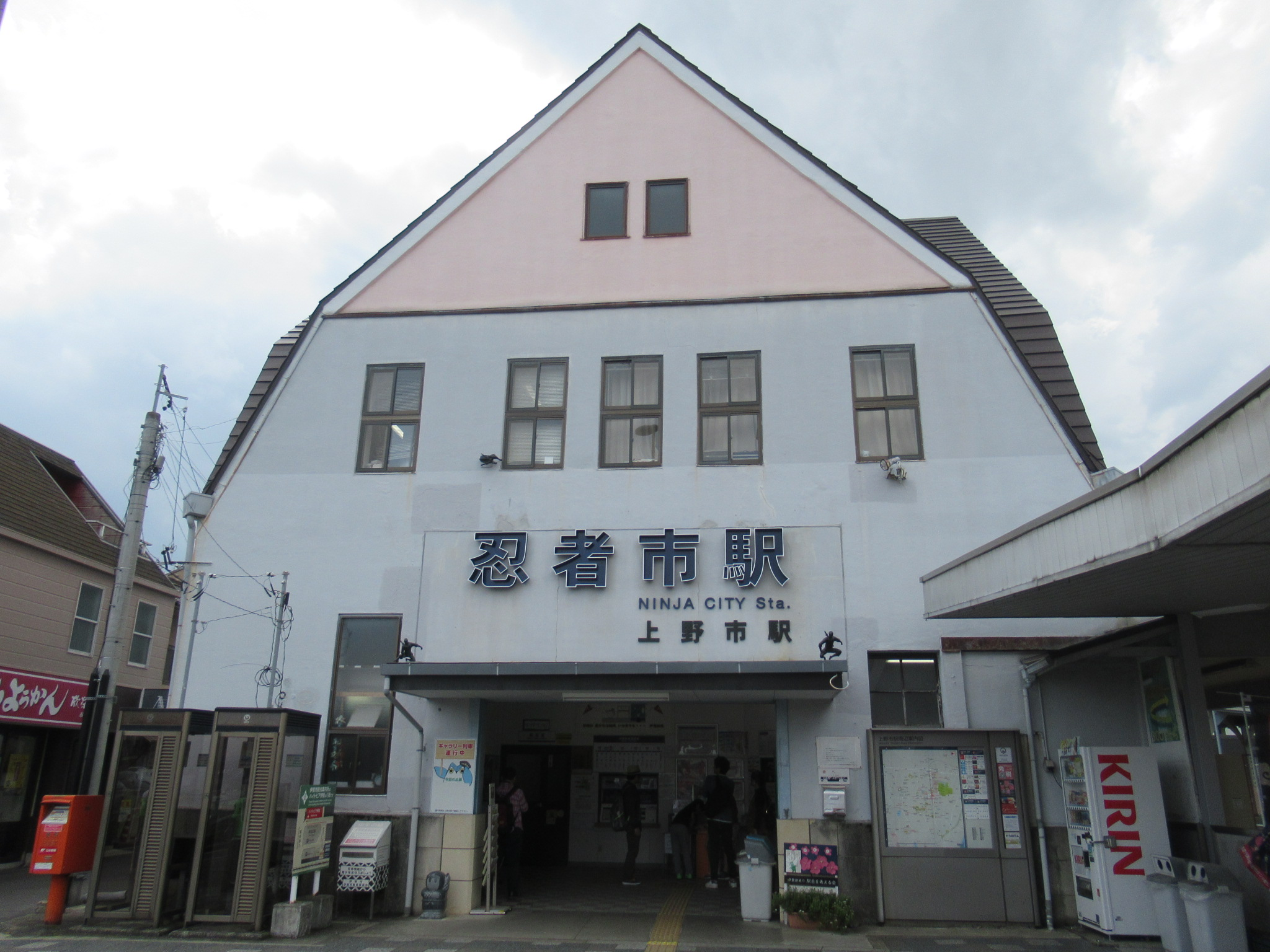
- Uenoshi Station in May 2019

General information
- Other names: Ninja City Station (忍者市駅 Ninjashi-eki)
- Location: 61-2, Ueno-Marunouchi, Iga-shi, Mie-ken 518-0873; Japan
- Coordinates: 34°46′04″N 136°07′48″E
- Operator: Iga Railway
- Line: ■ Iga Line
- Distance: 3.9 km from Iga-Ueno
- Platforms: 1 island platform
- Connections: Bus stop

Other information
- Website: Official website

History
- Opened: August 8, 1916
- Former names: Uenomachi (until 1941)

Passengers
- FY2019: 838 daily
Location
- Location within Mie Prefecture Location within Japan

Uenoshi Station (上野市駅, Uenoshi-eki) is a passenger railway station in located in the city of Iga, Mie Prefecture, Japan, operated by the private railway operator Iga Railway.

== Lines ==
Uenoshi Station is served by the Iga Line, and is located 3.9 rail kilometers from the starting point of the line at Iga-Ueno Station.

== Station layout ==
The station consists of a single island platform connected to a wooden 3-story station building by a level crossing. The station building dates from the original construction of the station and received protection by the national government as a Registered Tangible Cultural Property in 2021.

== Platforms ==
1	■ Iga Line	northbound for Iga-Ueno southbound for Iga-Kambe
2	■ Iga Line	southbound for Iga-Kambe

== Adjacent stations ==
«	Service	»
Iga Line
Nishi-Ōte	-	Hirokōji

== History ==
Uenoshi Station was opened on August 8, 1916 as Uenomachi Station (上野町駅). Through a series of mergers, the Iga Line became part of the Kintetsu network by June 1, 1944, but was spun out as an independent company in October 2007. The station was renamed to its present name on September 1, 1941. Freight operations were discontinued from October 1973.

== Passenger statistics ==
In fiscal 2019, the station was used by an average of 838 passengers daily (boarding passengers only).

== Surrounding area ==
- Haiseiden
- Iga City Office
- IGA Railway Headquarters
- Iga Ueno Castle
- Ueno Post Office
- Ueno Sangyōkaikan (Bus stop)

== See also ==
- List of railway stations in Japan
