= Japan National Route 422 =

Road in Japan

National Route 422
- 国道422号
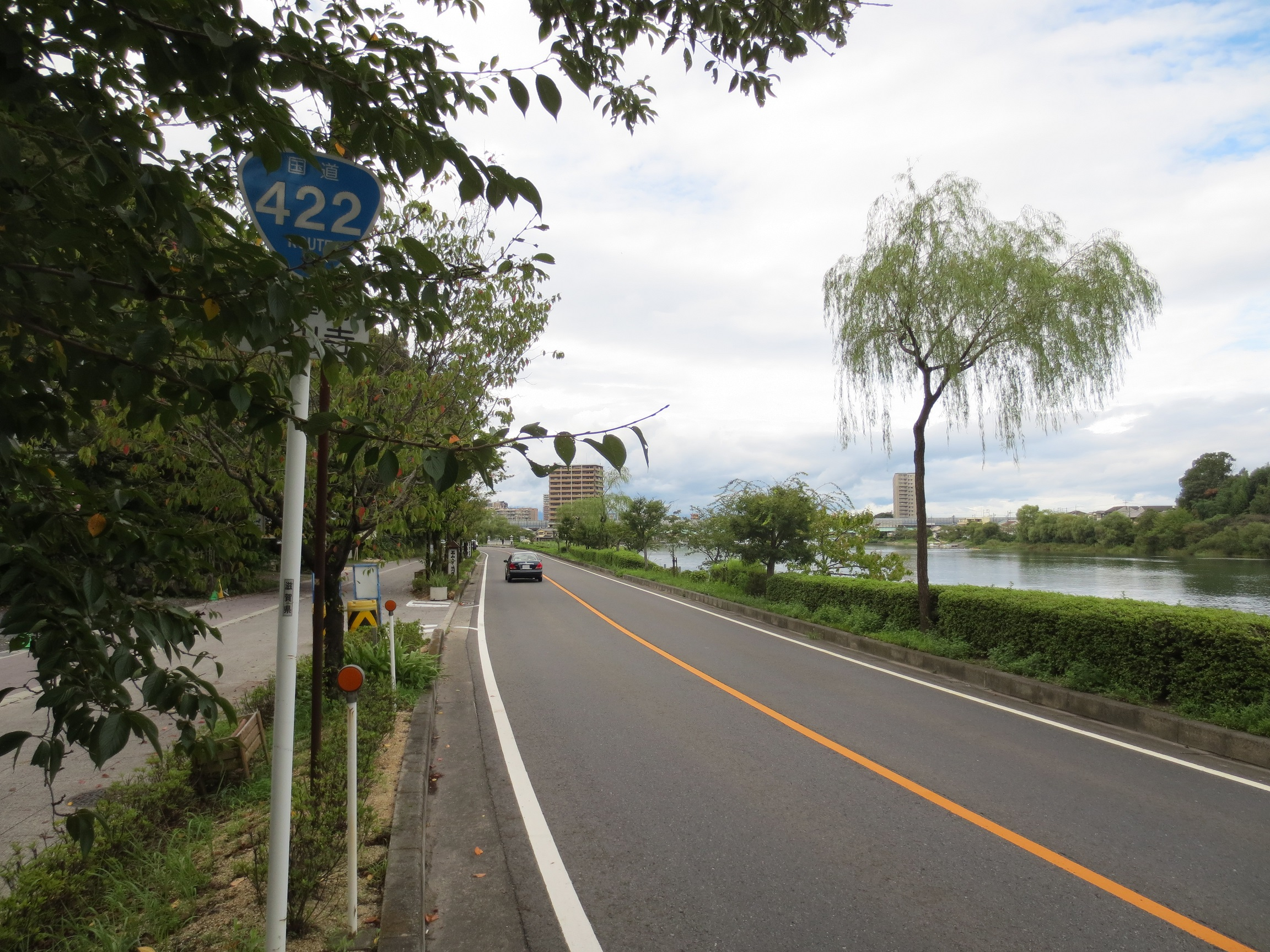

Route information
- Length: 163 km (101 mi)

Location
- Country: Japan

Highway system
- National highways of Japan; Expressways of Japan
← National Route 421	→ National Route 423

National Route 422 is a national highway of Japan connecting Ōtsu, Shiga and Kihoku, Mie in Japan, with a total length of 163 km (101.28 mi).
