= Iga-Kambe Station =

Railway station in Iga, Mie Prefecture, Japan

Iga-Kambe Station 伊賀神戸駅
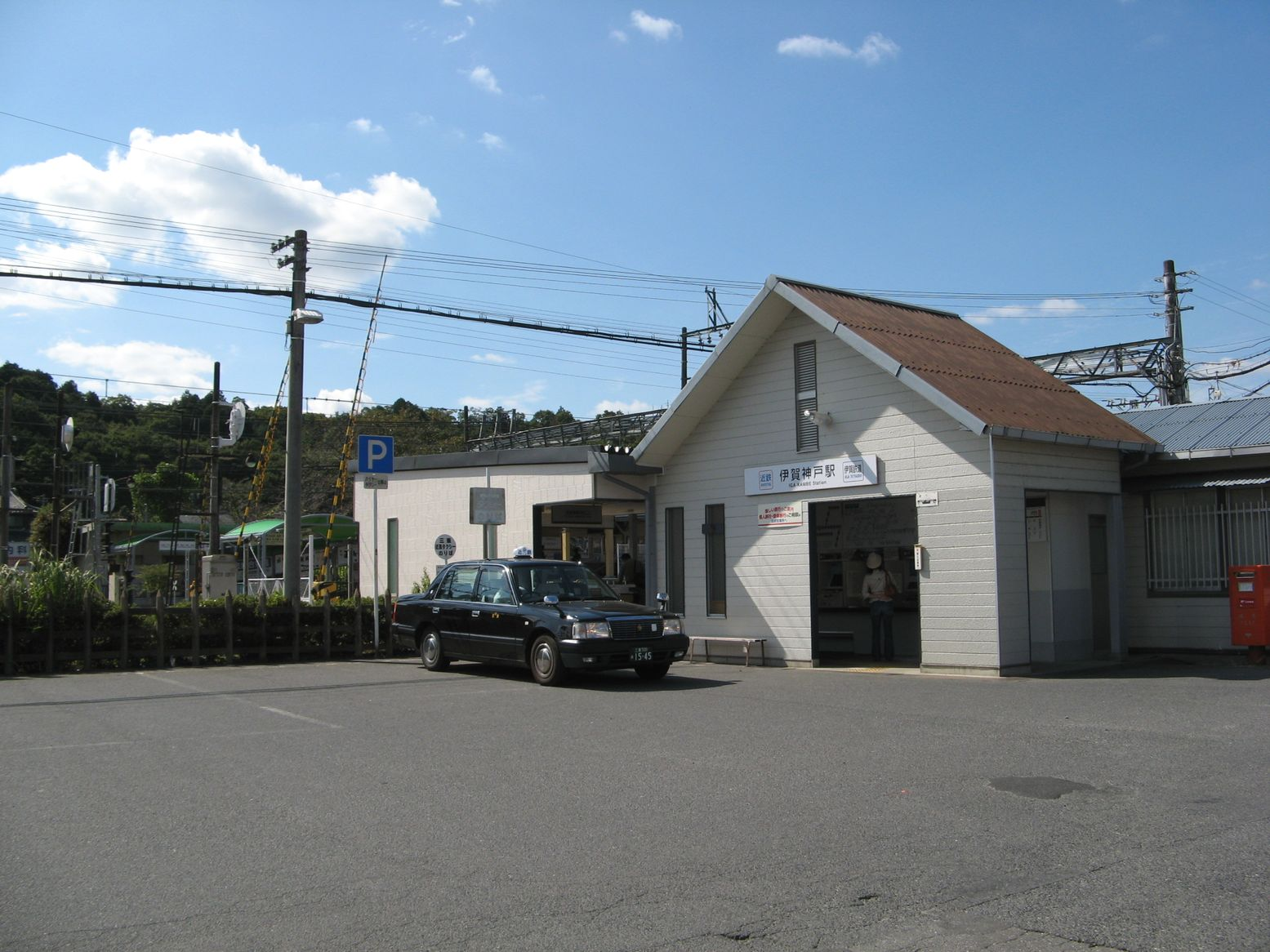
- Iga-Kambe Station in October 2007

General information
- Location: 2628-3, Hido, Iga-shi, Mie-ken 518-0115; Mie Prefecture; Japan
- Coordinates: 34.6735°N 136.1529°E
- Operator: Kintetsu Railway; Iga Railway
- Lines: Osaka Line; ■ Iga Line
- Platforms: 3 side platforms

Other information
- Station code: D52
- Website: Official website

History
- Opened: October 10, 1930

Passengers
- FY2019: 2246 (Kintetsu); 1350 (Iga Railway) daily
Location
- Location within Mie Prefecture Location within Japan

Iga-Kambe Station (伊賀神戸駅, Iga-Kambe-eki) is an interchange passenger railway station in located in the city of Iga, Mie Prefecture, Japan, operated by the private railway operator Kintetsu Railway.

== Lines ==
Iga-Kambe Station is served by the Kintetsu Osaka Line, and is located 75.5 rail kilometers from the starting point of the line at Ōsaka Uehommachi Station. It is also served by the Iga Railway Iga Line and is 16.6 rail kilometers from the terminus of that line at Iga-Ueno Station.

== Station layout ==
The station consists of three side platforms. From north to south they are numbered 5 (adjacent to the station building, and serving the Iga Line), and (either side of the Osaka Line) 1 and 2, serving, respectively, eastbound (down) trains towards Ise-Nakagawa and westbound (up) trains towards Nabari. Platform 1 was originally an island platform, but the track on its northern side was removed in 2007. At the same time, an earlier additional Iga Line track (no 6) was removed to allow improvements to be made to the station building including the provision of an end-access ramp to platform 5.

=== Platforms ===
5	■ Iga Railway Iga Line	for Uenoshi and Iga-Ueno
1	■ Osaka Line	for Ise-Nakagawa, Ujiyamada, Kashikojima, and Nagoya
2	■ Osaka Line	for Nabari, Yamato-Yagi, Osaka Uehommachi, Osaka Namba and Kyoto

== Adjacent stations ==
«	Service	»
Osaka Line
Mihata	Local	Aoyamachō
Mihata	Express	Aoyamachō
Mihata	Rapid Express	Aoyamachō
Nabari	Limited Express	Ise-Nakagawa
Iga Railway Iga Line
Hido	-	Terminus
Kintetsu Iga Line (abandoned section)
(Hido)	-	Mihata-Shinden

== History ==
Iga-Kambe Station opened on October 10, 1930 as a station on the Sangu Express Electric Railway. The station replaced Shoda Station (庄田駅) on the former Iga Electric Railway, which had been opened on July 18, 1922, but which was located several hundred meters from Iga-Kambe Station. The Iga Electric Railway became part of the Sangu Electric Railway on March 31, 1929. After merging with Osaka Electric Kido on March 15, 1941, the Sangu Electric Express became part of the Kansai Express Railway. This line was merged with the Nankai Electric Railway on June 1, 1944 to form Kintetsu. On October 1, 1964, the section of the Kintetsu Iga Line between this station and Mihata Station was abandoned, making this station effectively a terminus of the Kintetsu Iga Line. The remaining portion of the Kintetsu Iga Line from this station to Iga-Ueno Station became the Iga Railway, a separately-operated subsidiary company of Kintetetsu in 2007.

== Passenger statistics ==
In fiscal 2019, the Kintetsu station was used by an average of 2,246 passengers daily and the Ise Railway station by 1,350 passengers daily (boarding passengers only).

== Surrounding area ==
- Menard Aoyama Resort

== See also ==
- List of railway stations in Japan
