= List of international presidential trips made by Maithripala Sirisena =

Maithripala Sirisena served as the 7th President of Sri Lanka from 9 January 2015 to 18 November 2019. This article documents all international presidential trips made by Sirisena during his term in office.

== Summary of international trips ==
During his term, Maithripala Sirisena made 47 foreign trips to 29 countries. Sirisena never visited South America.

Map of international trips made by Maithripala Sirisena as president: (as of October 2016) 1 visit 2 visits 3 visits 4 visits 6 visits Sri Lanka

No. of visits	Country
6	India
4	United States
3	Japan, Thailand, United Kingdom
2	China, Pakistan, Singapore
1	Australia, Austria, Bangladesh, Cambodia, France, Germany, Georgia, Indonesia, Iran, Italy, Kenya, Maldives, Malta, Malaysia, Nepal, Philippines, Qatar, Russia, Seychelles, South Korea, Tajikistan, Vatican City

== 2015 ==
Maithripala Sirisena made 10 trips to 10 countries in the year 2015.

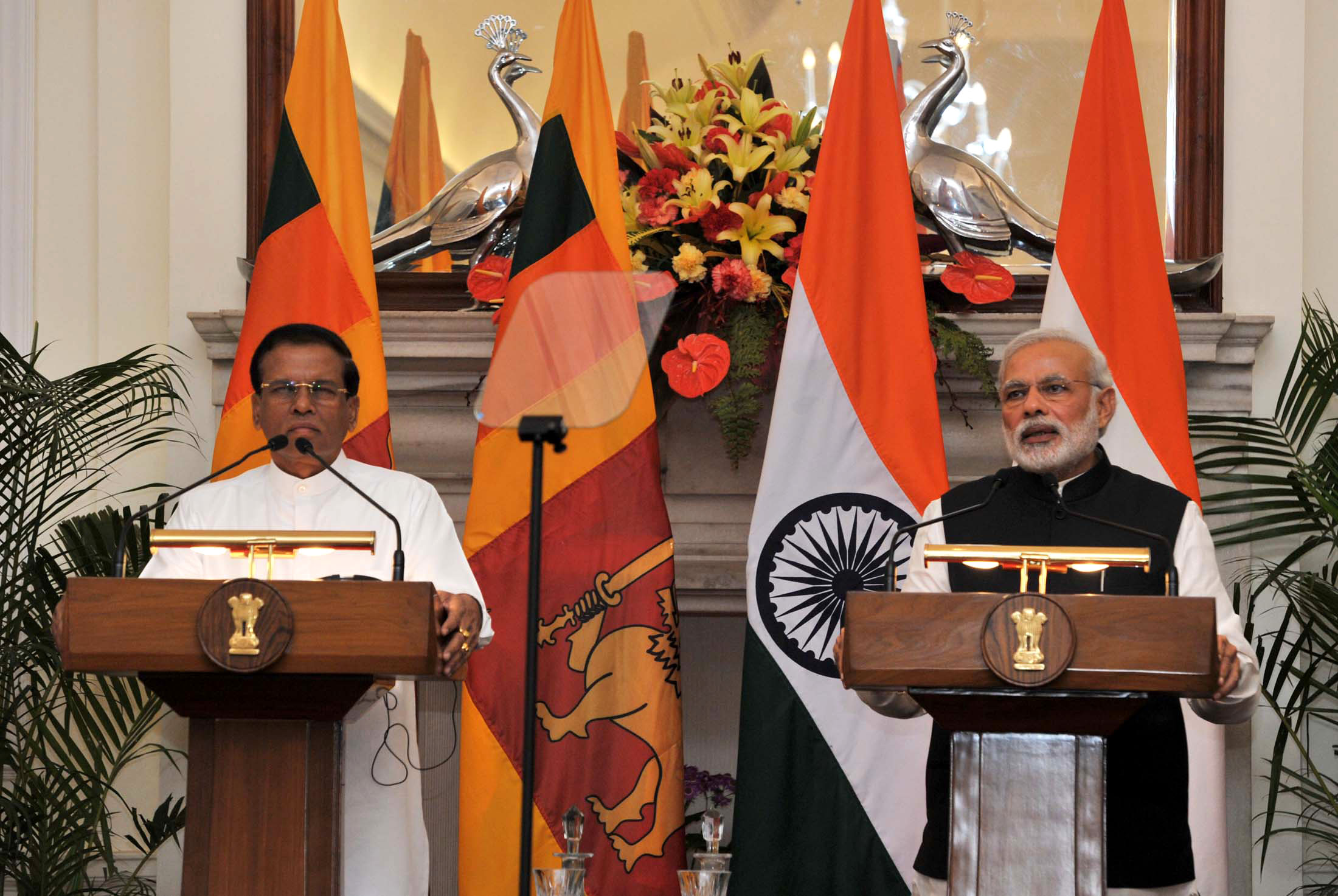
Sirisena in New Delhi with Narendra Modi, February 2015

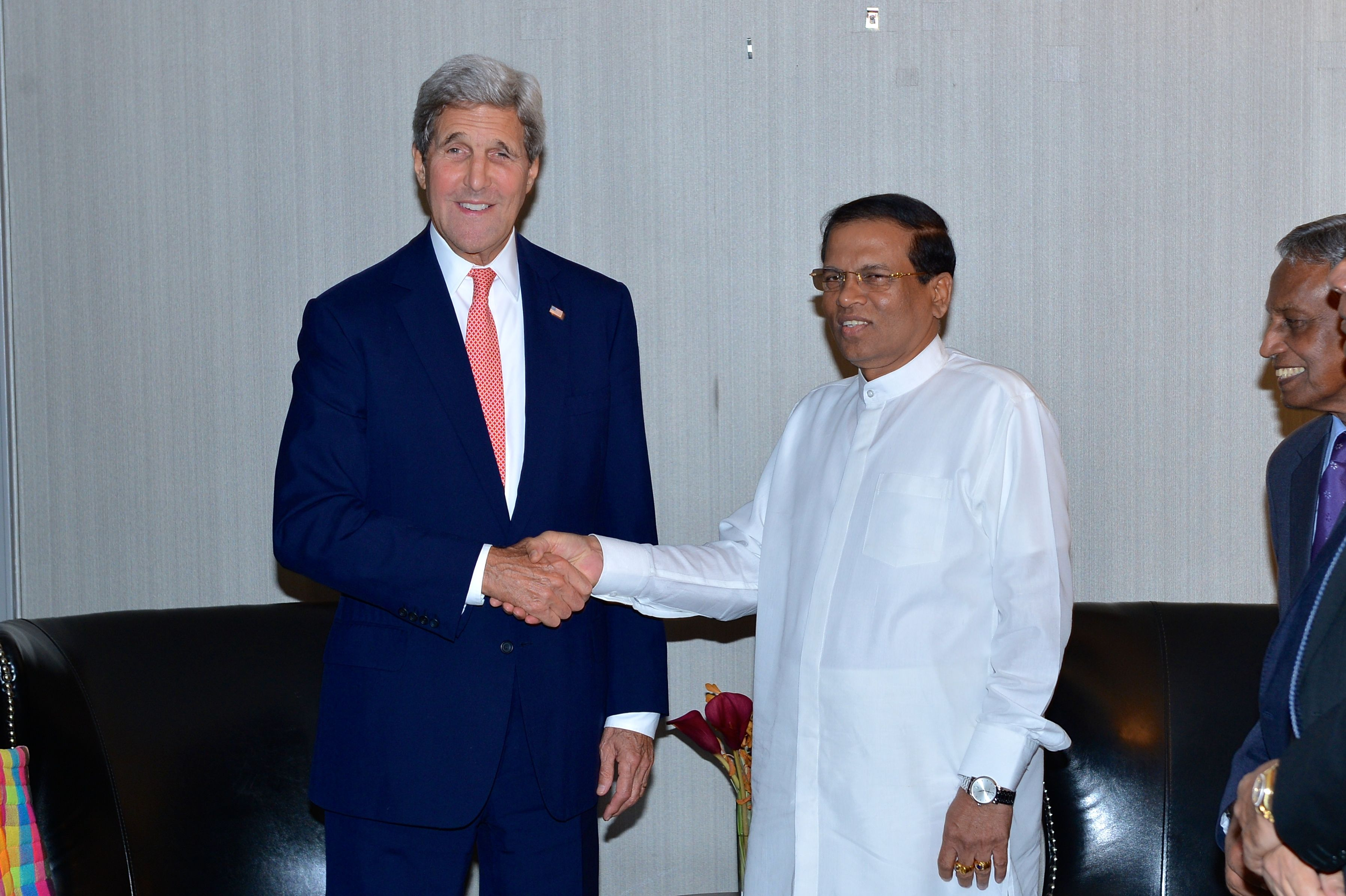
Meeting U.S. Secretary of State John Kerry on the sidelines of the 70th Regular Session of the UN General Assembly, September 2015

Country	Areas visited	Date(s)	Purpose(s)	Notes
India	New Delhi	15–18 February	State visit	See also: India-Sri Lanka relations The first overseas visit made by President Maitripala Sirisena, on the invitation of Indian prime minister Narendra Modi.
United Kingdom	London	7–11 March	Official visit	See also: Sri Lanka–United Kingdom relations Visited the UK as Chair in Office of the Commonwealth as part of Commonwealth Day celebrations. Met with Queen Elizabeth II, Prime Minister David Cameron, Leader of the Opposition Ed Miliband and Defense Secretary Michael Fallon.
China	Beijing; Boao	26–29 March	Asia Annual Conference and state visit	See also: China–Sri Lanka relations President Maithripala Sirisena visited China on the invitation of President of China Xi Jinping. President Sirisena also participated in the 2015 Asia Annual Conference in Boao.
Pakistan	Islamabad; Taxila Museum	5–7 April	State visit	See also: Pakistan–Sri Lanka relations At the invitation of President Mamnoon Hussain and Prime Minister Nawaz Sharif of Pakistan, President Maithripala Sirisena paid a State visit to Pakistan. Sirisena visited the Taxila Museum, which hosts many statues of Buddha.
Maldives	Malé	26–27 July	State visit	See also: Maldives–Sri Lanka relations At the invitation of President Abdulla Yameen, President Sirisena was invited as chief guest of the 50th National Independence Day ceremony of the Maldives.
United States	New York City	10–23 September	United Nations General Assembly and bilateral meetings	To attend the 70th United Nations General Assembly session, where he delivered a special address. Sirisena also held bilateral meetings with several leaders including Prime Minister of Malta Dr. Joseph Muscat, Prime Minister of Pakistan Nawaz Sharif, Prime Minister of New Zealand John Key and Prime Minister of Australia Malcolm Turnbull.
Thailand	Bangkok	1–4 November	State visit	At the invitation of Prime Minister General Prayut Chan-o-cha.
Malta	Valletta	27–29 November	Commonwealth Heads of Government Meeting 2015	Attended the 2015 Commonwealth Heads of Government Meeting (CHOGM).
France	Paris	29 November–1 December	2015 United Nations Climate Change Conference	Attended the 2015 United Nations Climate Change Conference.
Vatican	Vatican City	13–16 December	State visit	See also: Holy See–Sri Lanka relations At the invitation of Sovereign Pope Francis.

== 2016 ==
Maithripala Sirisena made 12 trips to 9 countries during the year 2016.

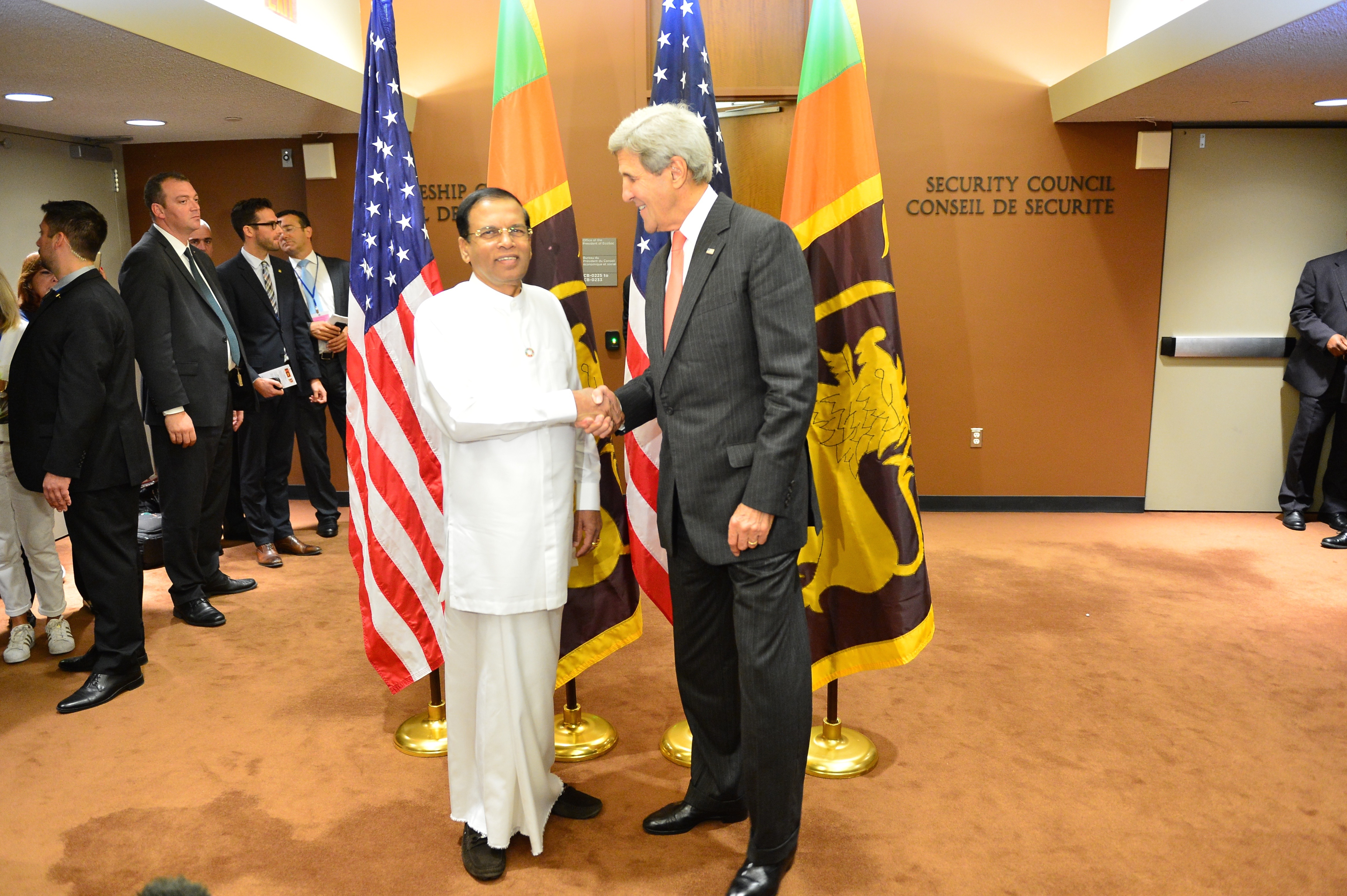
John Kerry meets Sirisena at the United Nations, New York City, in September 2016

Country	Areas visited	Date(s)	Purpose(s)	Notes
Germany	Berlin	15–18 February	State visit	At the invitation of the German chancellor Angela Merkel. Met with the president of Germany Joachim Gauck to further strengthen the economic and trade co-operation between the two countries. Sirisena visited the German Parliament and met with representatives of the Parliament and held bilateral discussions with the German Foreign Minister and the Minister of German Economic Affairs.
Austria	Vienna	18–21 February	State visit	Held talks with the Federal President Heinz Fischer at the Hofburg at the Presidential Palace, improving relations between the two countries.
Singapore	Singapore	27 February	Private visit	To visit Health Minister Rajitha Senaratne, who was receiving medical treatment.
United Kingdom	London	11–13 May	London Anti-Corruption Summit	See also: Sri Lanka–United Kingdom relations Attend the Anti-Corruption Summit organised by the British government, at the invitation of British prime minister David Cameron. Held bilateral discussions with Prime Minister Cameron during the summit.
India	New Delhi; Madhya Pradesh	13–15 May	State visit	See also: India-Sri Lanka relations Invited by Indian prime minister Narendra Modi to attend and address the valedictory session at the Vaicharick Mahakumbh, held as part of the Simhastha Mahakumbh in Ujjain. Held discussions on issues of Tamil Nadu fishermen with Prime Minister Modi, as well as talks on reconciliation in Sri Lanka and trade. Sirisena also visited the Sanchi Stupa and attend a function by the Maha Bodhi Society of Sri Lanka where he unveiled a statue of Anagarika Dharmapala.
Japan	Kashiko Island, Shima, Mie Prefecture	26–27 May	Group of Seven (G7)	See also: 42nd G7 summit Invited by Japanese prime minister Shinzo Abe. Sirisena attended the summit in Japan. He also met with US president Barack Obama and other G7 leaders.
United States	New York City	18–26 September	United Nations General Assembly & bilateral meetings	See also: United States-Sri Lanka relations To attend the 71st United Nations General Assembly session, where he delivered a special address. Sirisena had bilateral meetings with several leaders including United States Secretary of State John Kerry and Prime Minister of Australia Malcolm Turnbull
Thailand	Bangkok	7–10 October	Asia Corporation Dialogue Summit	Attend the 34 nation summit. Apart from attending the conference, President Sirisena held several bilateral meetings with state leaders, including Thai Prime Minister Prayuth Chan-o-cha.
India	Goa	15–17 October	BRICS	See also: India-Sri Lanka relations Invited by Indian prime minister Narendra Modi to attend and address the attend the BRICS- BIMSTEC outreach summit. Held talks with Bangladesh Prime Minister Sheikh Hasina and Myanmar's foreign minister Aung San Suu Kyi as well as the presidents of Russia and China.
Thailand	Bangkok	31 October	Funeral of Bhumibol Adulyadej	Attend the Funeral of King Bhumibol Adulyadej, King of Thailand, and pay respects on behalf of the people of Sri Lanka.
India	New Delhi	6–7 November	World Health Organization	See also: India-Sri Lanka relations Conference of Parties to the World Health Organization Framework Convention on Tobacco Control. Met with Indian president Pranab Mukherjee.
Malaysia	Kuala Lumpur	15–17 December	State visit	See also: Malaysia–Sri Lanka relations Held talks with the Prime Minister Najib Razak, improving relations between the two countries by signing several bilateral MOUs. Also met with King of Malaysia Muhammad V of Kelantan.

== 2017 ==
Maithripala Sirisena made 7 trips to 7 countries in the year 2017.

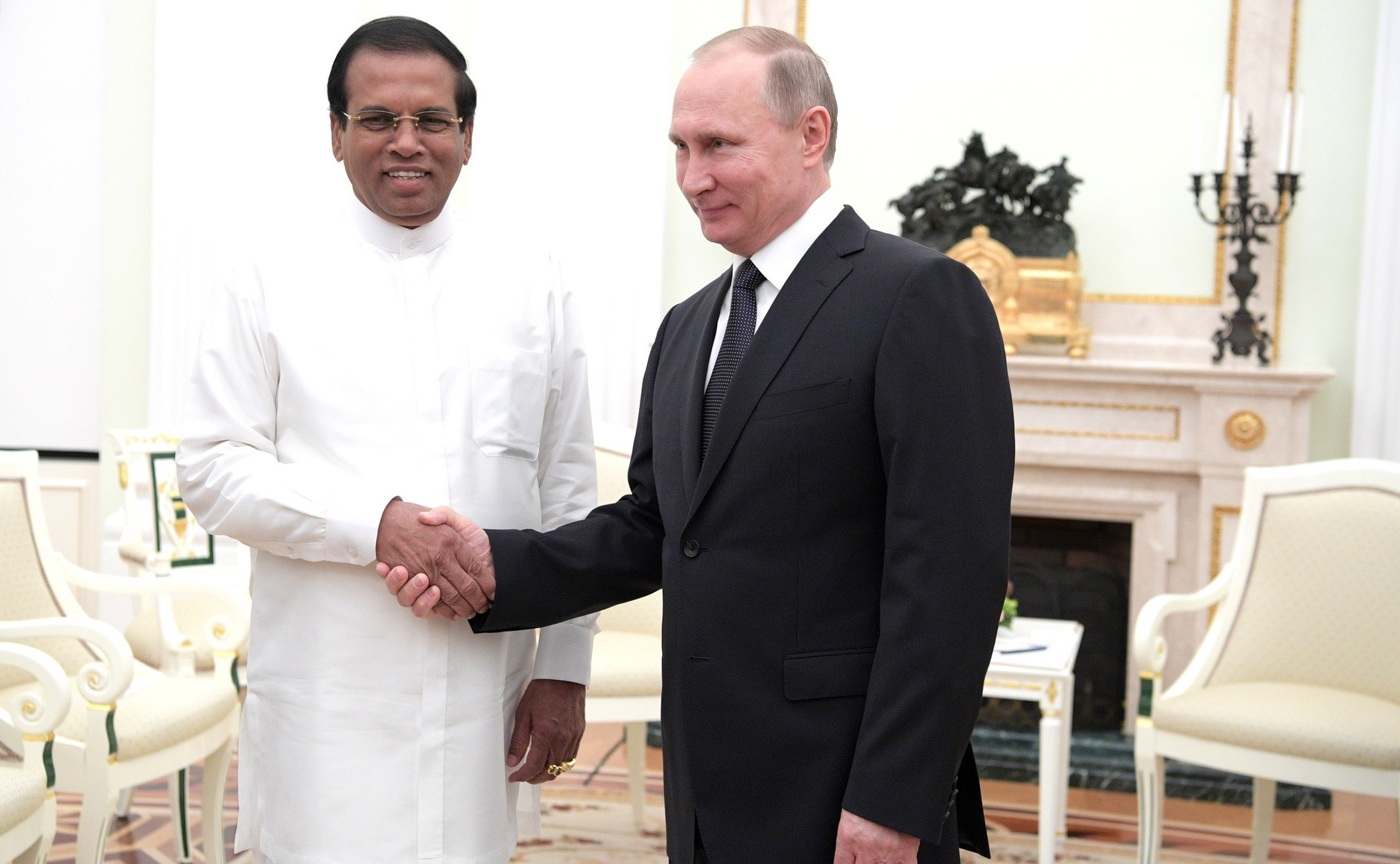
Sirisena at a meeting with Vladimir Putin in Moscow

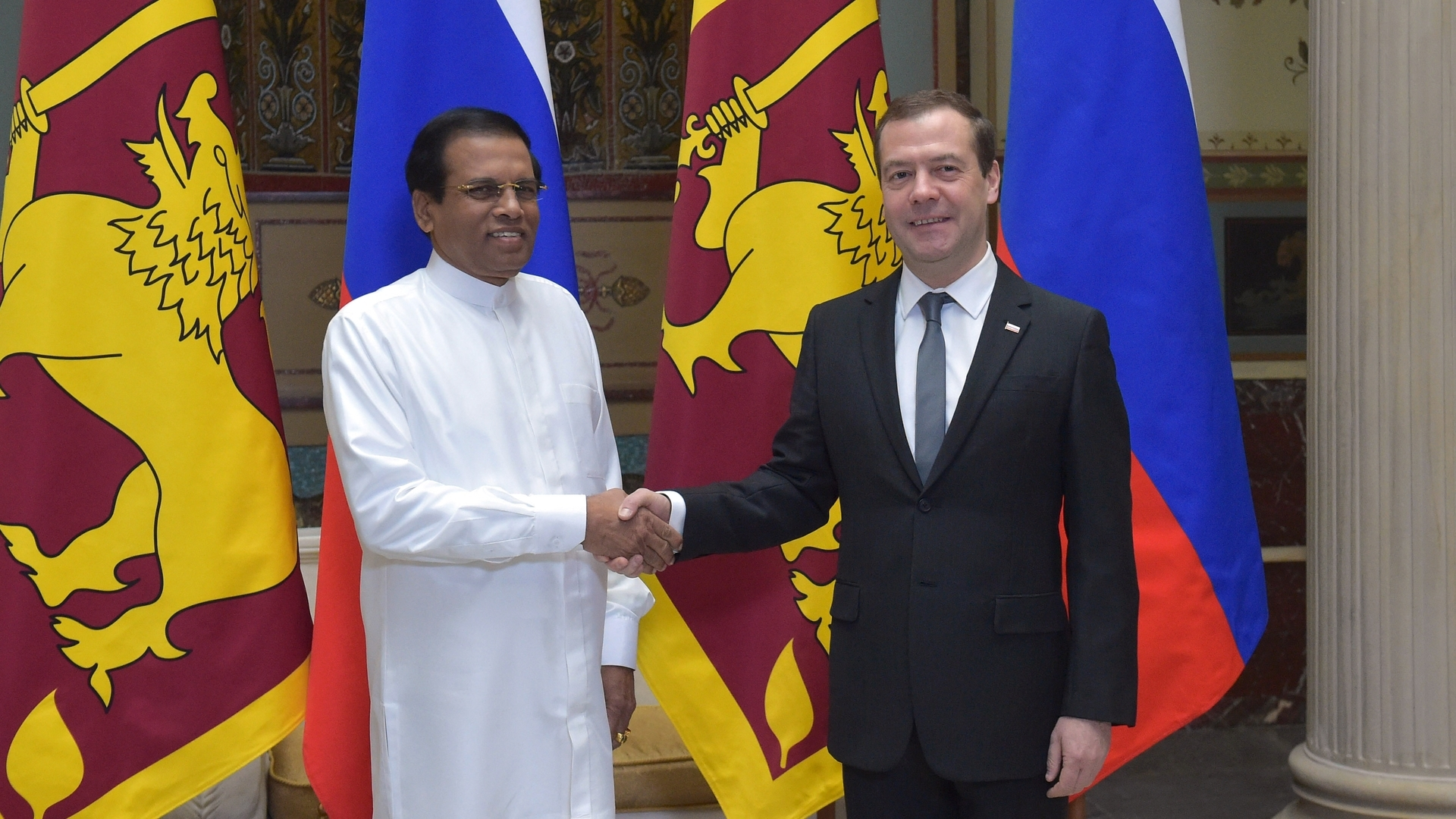
Meeting Dmitry Medvedev during Sirisena's visit to Russia

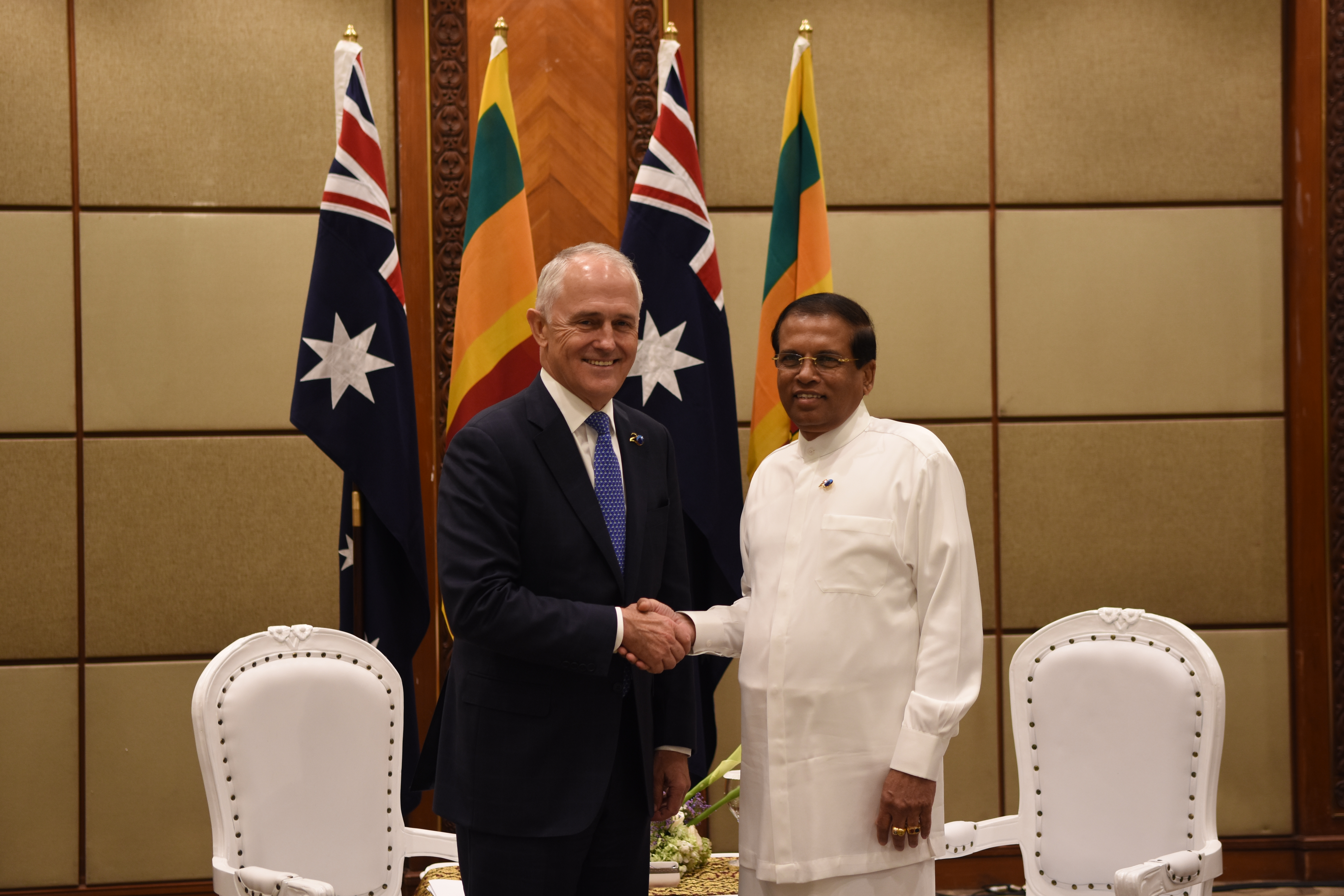
Meeting with Malcolm Turnbull in Jakarta

Country	Areas visited	Date(s)	Purpose(s)	Notes
Indonesia	Jakarta	6–8 March	State visit	At the invitation of the Indonesian president Joko Widodo and to attend the 20th Anniversary Summit of the Indian Ocean Rim Association (IORA).
Russia	Moscow	21–26 March	State visit	See also: Russia-Sri Lanka relations On the invitation extended by Russian president Vladimir Putin. This was the first visit to Russia by a Sri Lankan President.
Australia	Canberra	23–26 May	State visit	Special invitation extended by Australian prime minister Malcolm Turnbull.
Bangladesh	Dhaka	13–15 July	State visit	See also: Bangladesh-Sri Lanka relations President Sirisena was invited by Prime Minister Sheikh Hasina for an official 3 day visit.
United States	New York City	17–23 September	United Nations General Assembly & bilateral meetings	To attend the Seventy-second session of the United Nations General Assembly, where he delivered a special address. Sirisena also held bilateral meetings with several leaders.
Qatar	Doha	25–27 October	State visit	Invited by Emir of Qatar Tamim bin Hamad Al Thani for an official 2 day visit.
South Korea	Seoul	27–30 November	State visit	President Sirisena was invited by Korean President Moon Jae-in for a state visit.

== 2018 ==
Maithripala Sirisena made 10 trips to 10 countries in 2018.

Country	Areas visited	Date(s)	Purpose(s)	Notes
India	New Delhi	10–12 March	International Solar Alliance	See also: India-Sri Lanka relations Participated in the International Solar Alliance on the invitation of Indian prime minister Narendra Modi and French president Emmanuel Macron.
Japan	Tokyo; Hiroshima	12–15 March	State visit	See also: Japan-Sri Lanka relations Sirisena met with Emperor Akihito and Empress Michiko and held bilateral discussions with the Japanese prime minister Shinzo Abe.
Pakistan	Islamabad	22–24 March	State visit	See also: Pakistan-Sri Lanka relations To attend the Pakistan Republic Day celebrations as chief guest on an invitation extended by Pakistan President Mamnoon Hussain.
United Kingdom	London	16–23 April	Commonwealth Heads of Government Meeting 2018	See also: Sri Lanka-United Kingdom relations To attend the Commonwealth Heads of Government Meeting 2018. President Sirisena met with the UK's Secretary of State for International Trade Liam Fox, member of the British House of Lords Lord Baron Naseby.
Iran	Tehran	12–14 May	State visit	See also: Iran-Sri Lanka relations On invitation of Iranian president Hassan Rouhani, whom he met as well as Supreme Leader of Iran Ayatollah Ali Khamenei.
Italy	Rome	15–17 July	Committee on Forestry	To attend the 24th session of the Committee on Forestry (COFO) and the 6th World Forest Week.
Georgia	Tbilisi	17–20 July	Open Government Partnership	To attend the 5th Session of Open Government Partnership. President Sirisena also held a bilateral meeting with the Georgian president Giorgi Margvelashvili.
Nepal	Kathmandu; Lumbini	29 August–1 September	BIMSTEC	See also: Nepal-Sri Lanka relations To attend the 4th Summit of the Bay of Bengal Initiative for Multisectoral Technical and Economic Cooperation (BIMSTEC). The president also met with the leaders of Nepal and Myanmar.
United States	New York City	23–29 September	United Nations General Assembly & bilateral meetings	See also: Sri Lanka-United States relations To address to the 73rd Session of the United Nations General Assembly. Met with Malaysian prime minister Mahathir Mohamad.
Seychelles	Victoria	8–10 October	State visit	Official visit on the invitation of Seychelles President Danny Faure.

== 2019 ==
Maithripala Sirisena made 8 trips to 8 countries in the year 2019.

Country	Areas visited	Date(s)	Purpose(s)	Notes
Philippines	Metro Manila; Los Baños	15–19 January	State visit	See also: Philippines–Sri Lanka relations State visit to discuss bilateral relations, focusing on areas of mutual interest, including political, economic, agriculture, cultural and people-to-people engagement with his Philippine counterpart, President Rodrigo Duterte. Sirisena also visited the Asian Development Bank (ADB), and the International Rice Research Institute (IRRI) in Los Baños.
Singapore	Singapore	23–25 January	3rd Forum of Ministers and Environment Authorities of Asia Pacific	To deliver the Keynote address at the Third Forum of Ministers and Environment Authorities of Asia Pacific. Also held bilateral discussions with the President and Prime Minister of Singapore.
Kenya	Nairobi	13–17 March	United Nations Environment Assembly	See also: Kenya–Sri Lanka relations To attend the United Nations Environment Assembly. President Sirisena also meet with President Uhuru Kenyatta.
China	Beijing	13–15 May	Conference on Dialogue of Asian Civilizations	See also: China–Sri Lanka relations To attend the Conference on Dialogue of Asian Civilizations. President Sirisena also met with Chinese president Xi Jinping.
India	New Delhi	30–31 May	Inauguration of Narendra Modi	See also: India–Sri Lanka relations To attend the inauguration ceremony of the second term of Prime Minister Narendra Modi.
Tajikistan	Dushanbe	13–15 June	2019 Conference on Interaction and Confidence-Building Measures in Asia	To attend the 2019 Conference on Interaction and Confidence-Building Measures in Asia. President Sirisena had bilateral meeting with President of Tajikistan Emomali Rahmon and delivered a special lecture at the heads of state conference on 15 June.
Cambodia	Phnom Penh; Angkor	7–10 August	State visit	On the invitation of King Norodom Sihamoni, with the aim of further strengthening bilateral relations between the two countries. Met with Prime Minister Hun Sen as well.
Japan	Tokyo	21–23 October	Enthronement of Japanese emperor	See also: Japan–Sri Lanka relations To attend the enthronement of the new Japanese emperor. President Sirisena also had a meeting with former Japanese prime minister Yasuo Fukuda.

== Cancelled visits ==
Country	Areas that were to be visited	Date(s)	Purpose(s)	Notes
Pakistan	Islamabad	November 2016	SAARC Summit	See also: 19th SAARC summit Summit cancelled.
Iran	Tehran	November/December 2016, January 2017	State visit	See also: Iran-Sri Lanka relations Visit cancelled. The two presidents met during the Asian Cooperation Dialogue Summit in Bangkok.
Bangladesh	Dhaka	26 March 2017	State visit	See also: Bangladesh-Sri Lanka relations Visit cancelled. Sirisena was invited to be the chief guest at the country's Independence Day celebrations.

== Multilateral meetings participated in by Sirisena ==
Group	Year				
Group	2015	2016	2017	2018	2019
ACD	none	8–10 October, Bangkok	none	2018, Tehran	none
CHOGM	27–29 November, Birgu	none	none	19–20 April, London	none
G-15	2015, Tokyo	none	none	none	none
NAM	none	TBA 2016, Venezuela	none	none	none
SCO	14–15 December, Zhengzhou	TBA 2016, Bishkek	none	none	none
SAARC	none	September 2016, Islamabad	none	none	none
Others	UN Climate Change; 30 November, Paris	G7 summit 26–27 May	none		
Others	UN Climate Change; 30 November, Paris	London; Anti-Corruption Summit; 11–13 May	none		
██ = Did not attend; ██ = Future event

== See also ==
- Foreign policy of Maithripala Sirisena
- Timeline of the presidency of Maithripala Sirisena
- List of international prime ministerial trips made by Ranil Wickremesinghe
