= 42nd G7 summit =

2016 international leader meeting in Japan

Coordinates: 34°18′30″N 136°49′7″E

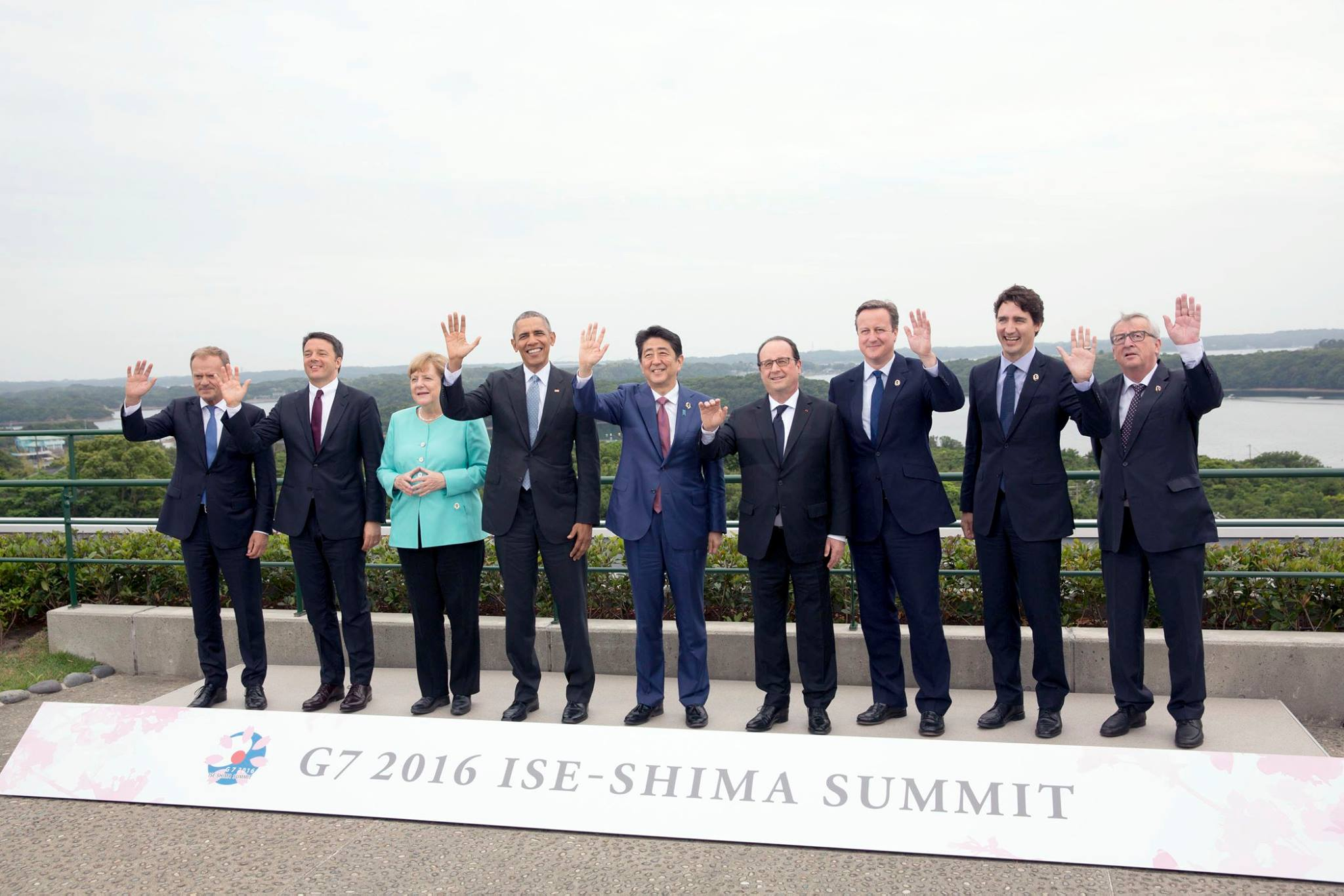
- Host country: Japan
- Date: 26–27 May 2016
- Cities: Shima
- Venues: Shima Kanko Hotel, Kashiko Island
- Participants: Canada; France; Germany; Italy; Japan; United Kingdom; United States; European Union Invited guests: Bangladesh; Chad; Indonesia; Laos; Papua New Guinea; Sri Lanka; Vietnam
- Follows: 41st G7 summit
- Precedes: 43rd G7 summit

The 42nd G7 summit was held on 26–27 May 2016 at the Shima Kanko Hotel in Kashiko Island, Shima, Mie Prefecture, Japan. In March 2014, the G7 declared that a meaningful discussion was currently not possible with Russia in the context of the G8. Since then, meetings have continued within the G7 process.

== Host selection ==
Eight Japanese cities bid to host the 42nd G7 summit in 2016. Prime Minister Shinzō Abe announced on 5 June 2015 that Shima in Mie Prefecture was selected against other bids from Hiroshima, Kobe, Nagoya, Sendai, Niigata, Karuizawa, and Hamamatsu.

When the central government's deadline closed in August 2014 for prefectural governors to apply to host the summit, Mie Prefecture was not in the running. A member of the Prime Minister's Office actually contacted the governor of Mie Prefecture in December 2014, encouraging him to submit a bid. Mie Prefecture was subsequently declared a candidate on 21 January 2015.

Ise Grand Shrine had an advantage in terms of security, as it has regularly hosted visits by both the Imperial family and Japanese political leaders. Another plus was its location in close proximity to Chūbu Centrair International Airport in the Aichi Prefecture, offering easy access to visitors. Moreover, Prime Minister Abe had long had a fascination with Ise Shrine. Abe had a custom of visiting the shrine every year after New Year's holiday, and was even known to postpone meetings so that he could attend a ceremony held at the shrine.

== Leaders at the summit ==
The attendees included the leaders of the seven G7 member states, as well as representatives of the European Union. The President of the European Commission has been a welcome participant in all meetings and decision-making since 1981.

The 42nd G7 summit was the first summit for Canadian Prime Minister Justin Trudeau. It was also the final summit for British Prime Minister David Cameron, French President François Hollande, Italian Prime Minister Matteo Renzi, and US President Barack Obama.

=== Participants ===
**Core G7 members** Host state and leader are shown in bold text.
Member		Represented by	Title
(Canada)	Canada	Justin Trudeau	Prime Minister
(France)	France	François Hollande	President
(Germany)	Germany	Angela Merkel	Chancellor
(Italy)	Italy	Matteo Renzi	Prime Minister
(Japan)	**Japan**	**Shinzō Abe**	**Prime Minister**
(United Kingdom)	United Kingdom	David Cameron	Prime Minister
(United States)	United States	Barack Obama	President
(European Union)	European Union	Jean-Claude Juncker	Commission President
(European Union)	European Union	Donald Tusk	Council President
**Guest Invitees (Countries)**
Member		Represented by	Title
(Bangladesh)	Bangladesh	Sheikh Hasina	Prime Minister
(Chad)	Chad	Idriss Déby	President
(Indonesia)	Indonesia	Joko Widodo	President
(Laos)	Laos	Thongloun Sisoulith	Prime Minister
(Papua New Guinea)	Papua New Guinea	Peter O'Neill	Prime Minister
(Sri Lanka)	Sri Lanka	Maithripala Sirisena	President
(Vietnam)	Vietnam	Nguyễn Xuân Phúc	Prime Minister

== Agenda ==
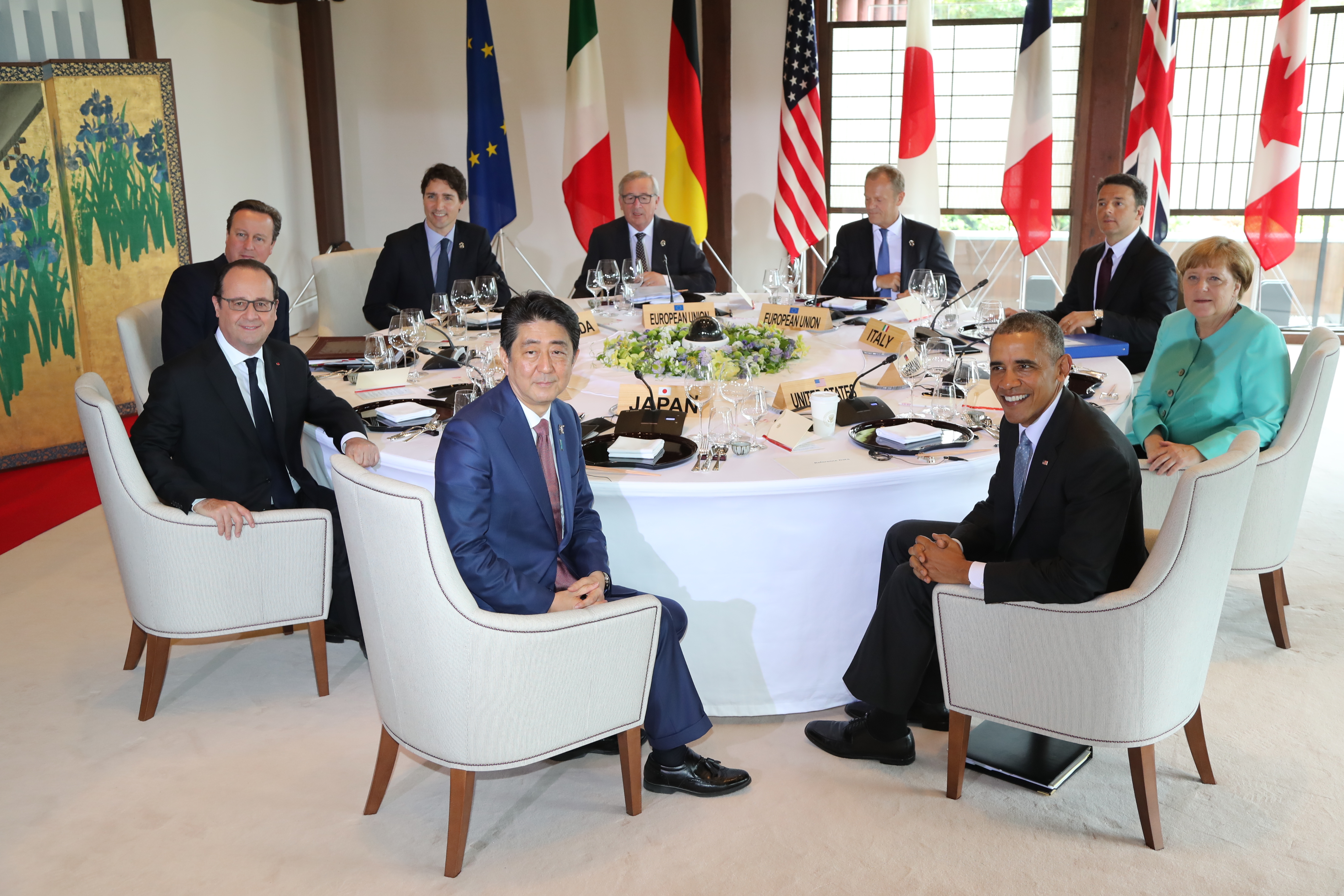
Working session on 26 May 2016

The Japanese G7 presidency announced the following agenda:

=== Global economy and trade ===
The G7 leaders aim to address challenges affecting the growth of the world economy, like slowdowns in emerging markets and drops in the price of oil.

The G7 also issued a warning in the wake of the upcoming referendum on the United Kingdom's membership of the European Union that "a UK exit from the EU would reverse the trend towards greater global trade and investment, and the jobs they create and is a further serious risk to growth". Commitment to an EU–Japan Free Trade Agreement – which would mean the elimination of the vast majority of trade tariffs, and boost imports and exports in key areas such as agriculture, car manufacturing and clothing, and which the British government alleges "will be worth the equivalent of £200 for every household" – was solidified, with a possible signing in autumn. Cameron also claimed that the deal, alongside the highly unpopular Transatlantic Trade and Investment Partnership (TTIP) and the Trans Pacific Partnership (TPP), would boost the world economy by £340bn.

Despite this, in the wake of the Panama Papers, an editorial by Oxfam Canada titled "G7 sides with tax dodgers" criticised the G7's commitment to free trade; the editorial said:

G7 leaders have sided with the tax dodgers and not the public. Despite all the talk of action, the G7 have missed this opportunity to end the destructive era of tax havens, and the world's poorest people – especially women and girls, will pay the price."

=== Foreign policy ===
The G7 leaders aim to discuss current foreign policy issues like counterterrorism, conflicts in the Middle East, the Russo-Ukrainian war, North Korea's nuclear program, and the territorial disputes in the South China Sea.

=== Climate change and energy ===
The G7 leaders will discuss "how to lead the overall efforts of the international community in addressing climate change" following the signing of the Paris Agreement in April. The leaders will also discuss their leading role in energy policy and ensuring energy security.

=== Development ===
As the first G7 summit following the adoption of the Sustainable Development Goals in September 2015, the G7 leaders will discuss advancing and promoting the Goals.

=== Quality infrastructure investment ===
The G7 leaders will discuss the importance of quality infrastructure investment contributing to sustainable development.

=== Health ===
The G7 leaders will discuss strengthening the response to widespread epidemics "by taking into account the lessons learned from previous outbreaks" like the Ebola virus epidemic in West Africa. They will also discuss the promotion of universal health care.

=== Women ===
The G7 leaders will discuss the promotion of women's empowerment in education, science and technology, and in a wider range of areas.

== Gallery of participating leaders ==
=== Core G7 participants ===
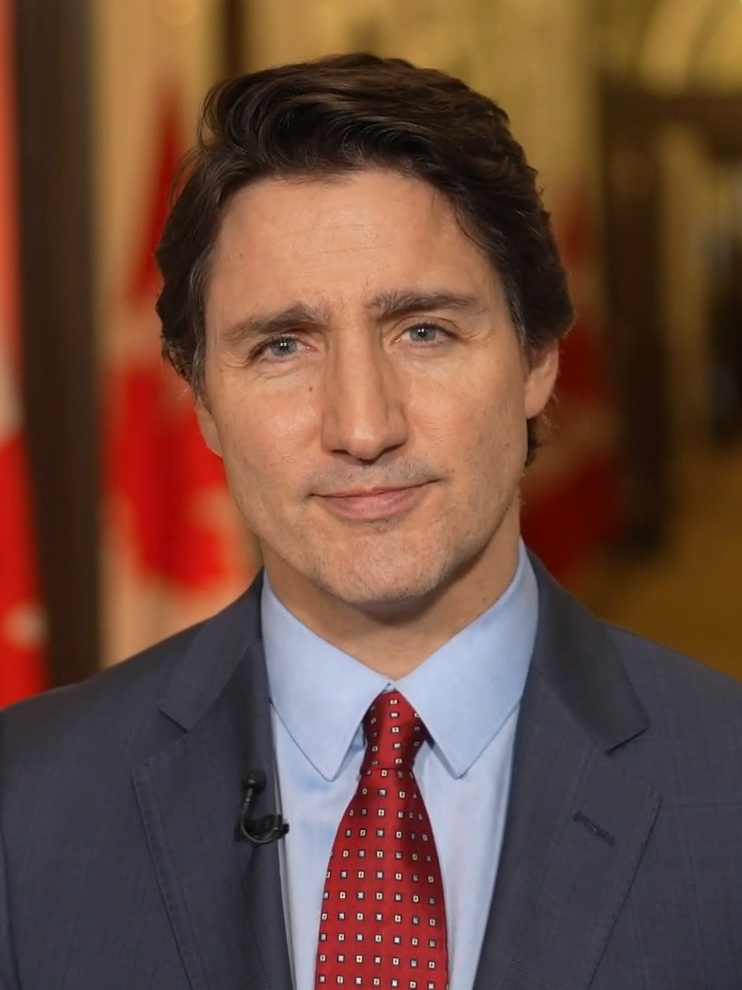
(Canada) Canada
Justin Trudeau,
Prime Minister

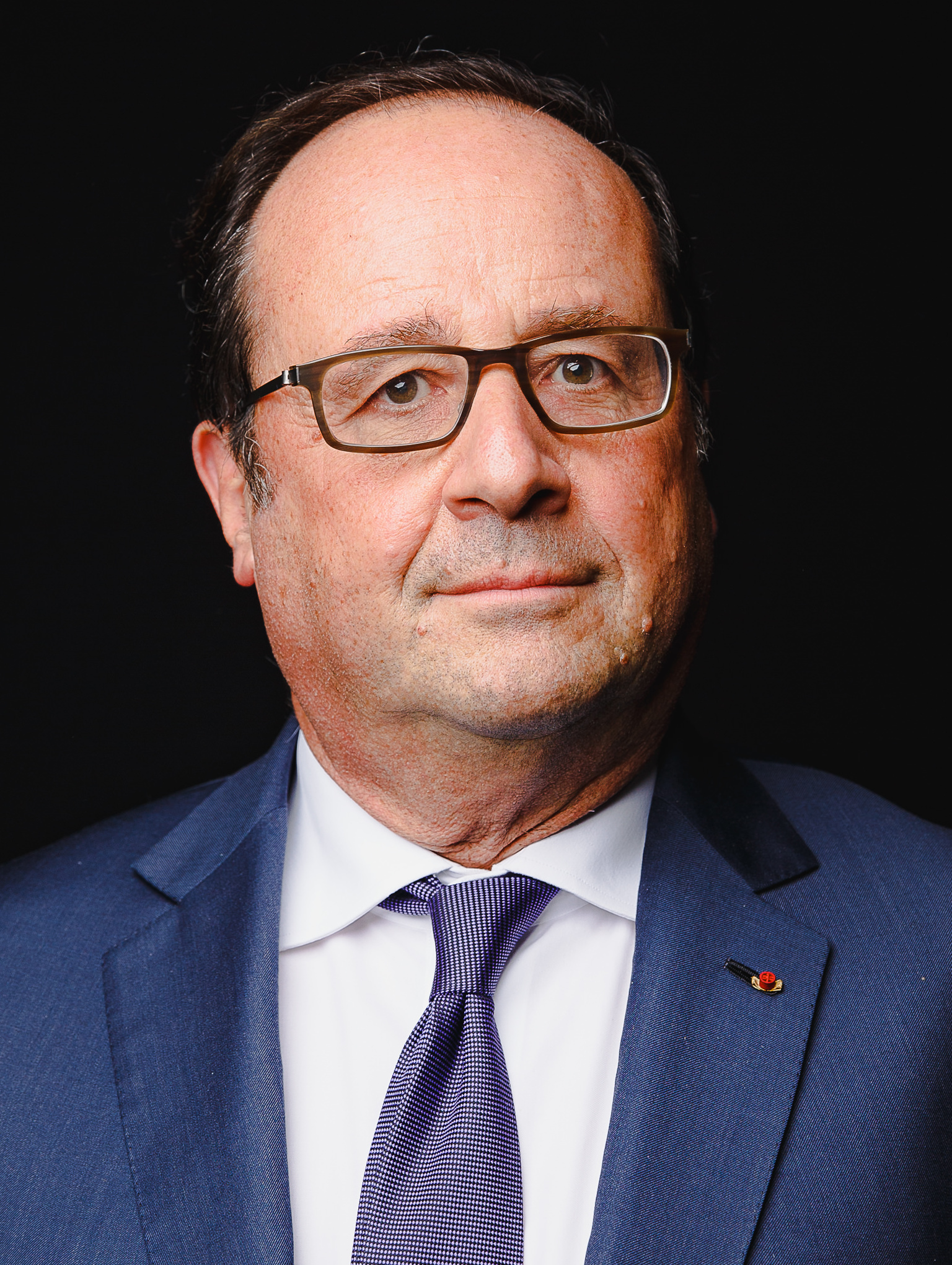
(France) France
François Hollande,
President

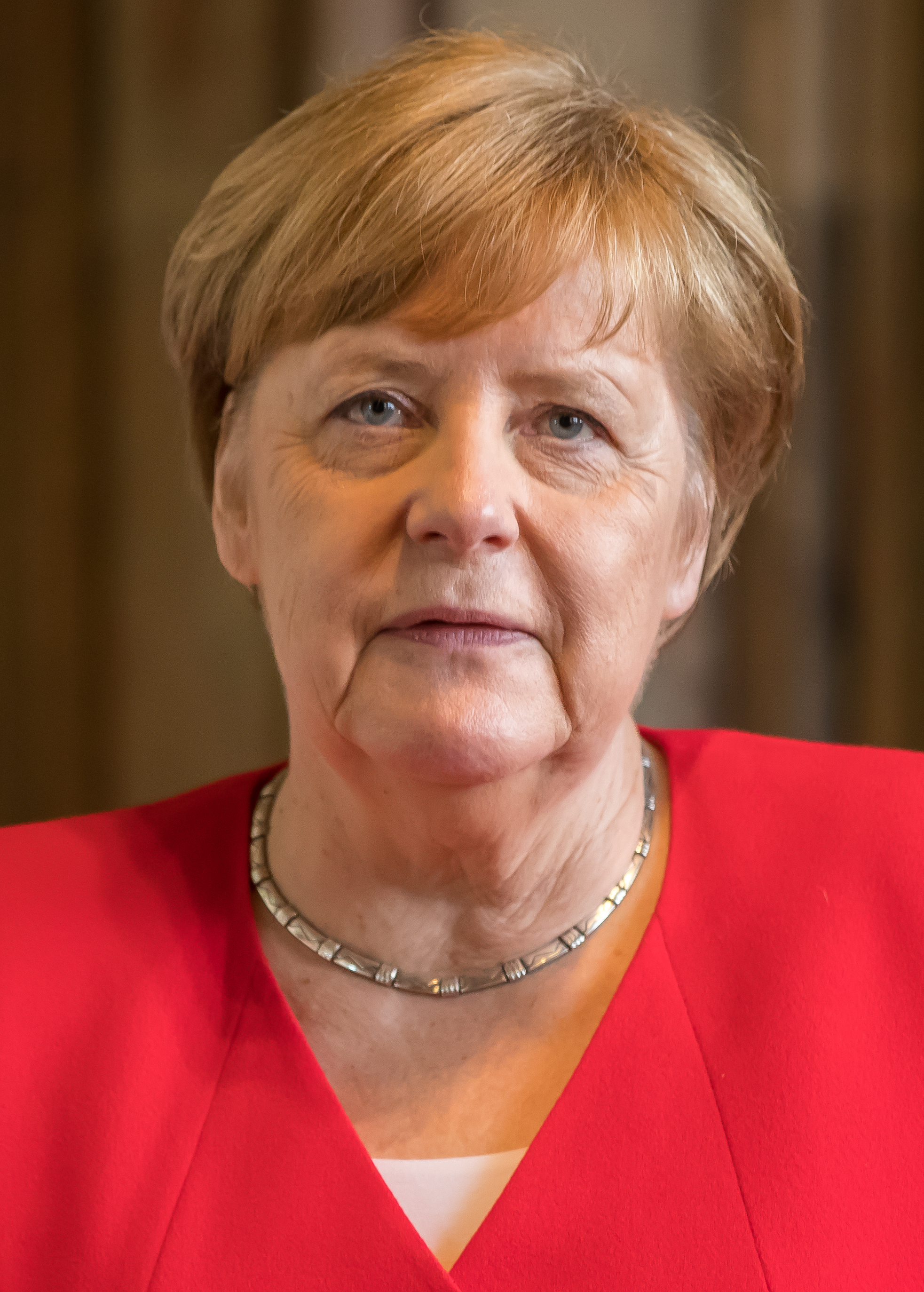
(Germany) Germany
Angela Merkel,
Chancellor

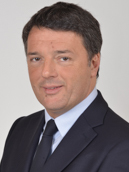
(Italy) Italy
Matteo Renzi,
Prime Minister

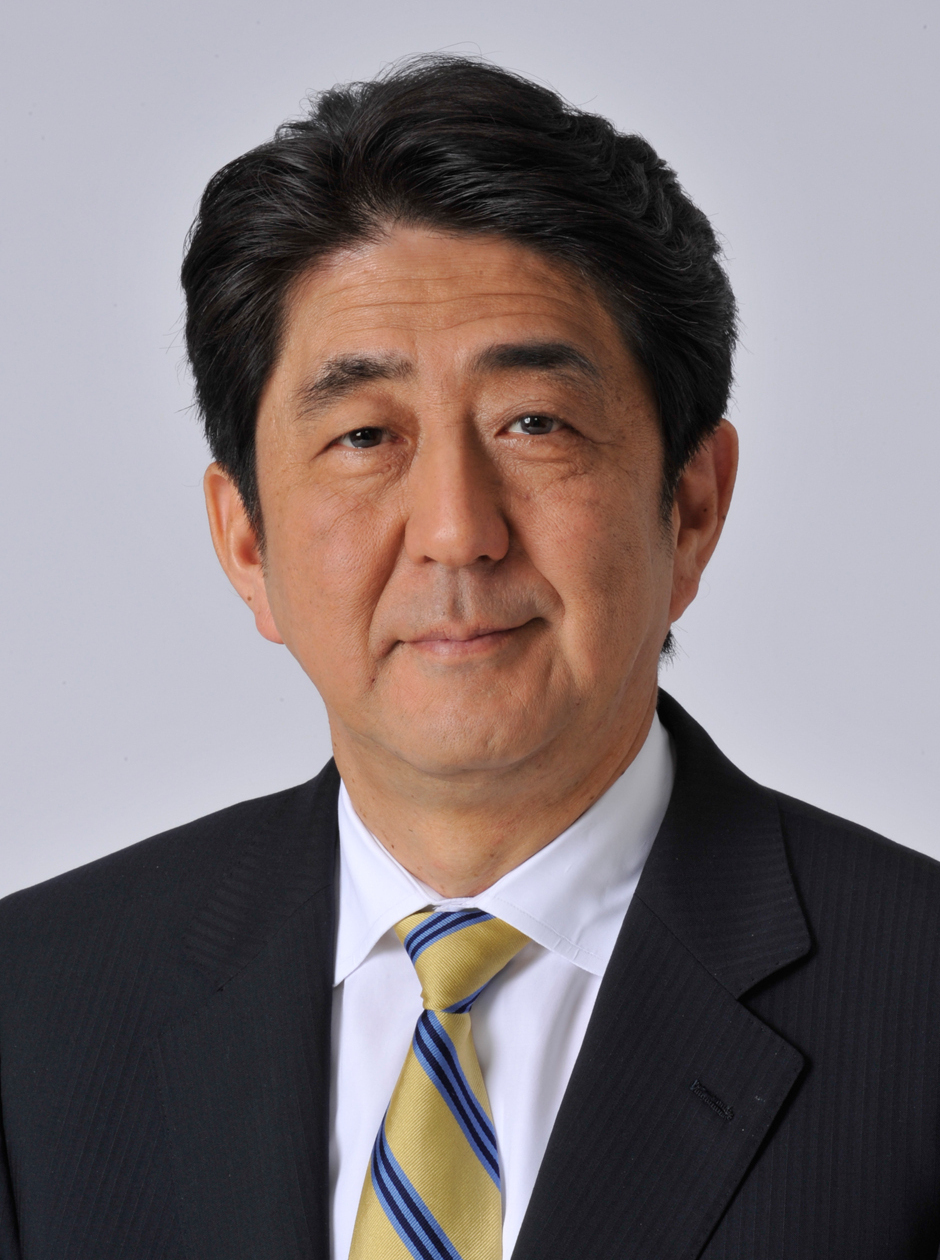
(Japan) Japan
Shinzō Abe,
Prime Minister (Host)

(United Kingdom) United Kingdom
David Cameron,
Prime Minister

(United States) United States
Barack Obama,
President
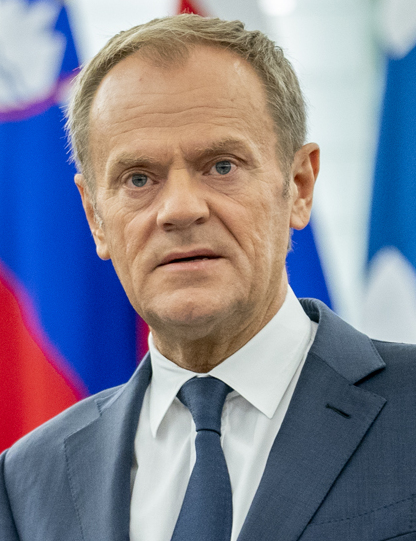
(European Union) European Union
Donald Tusk,
Council President

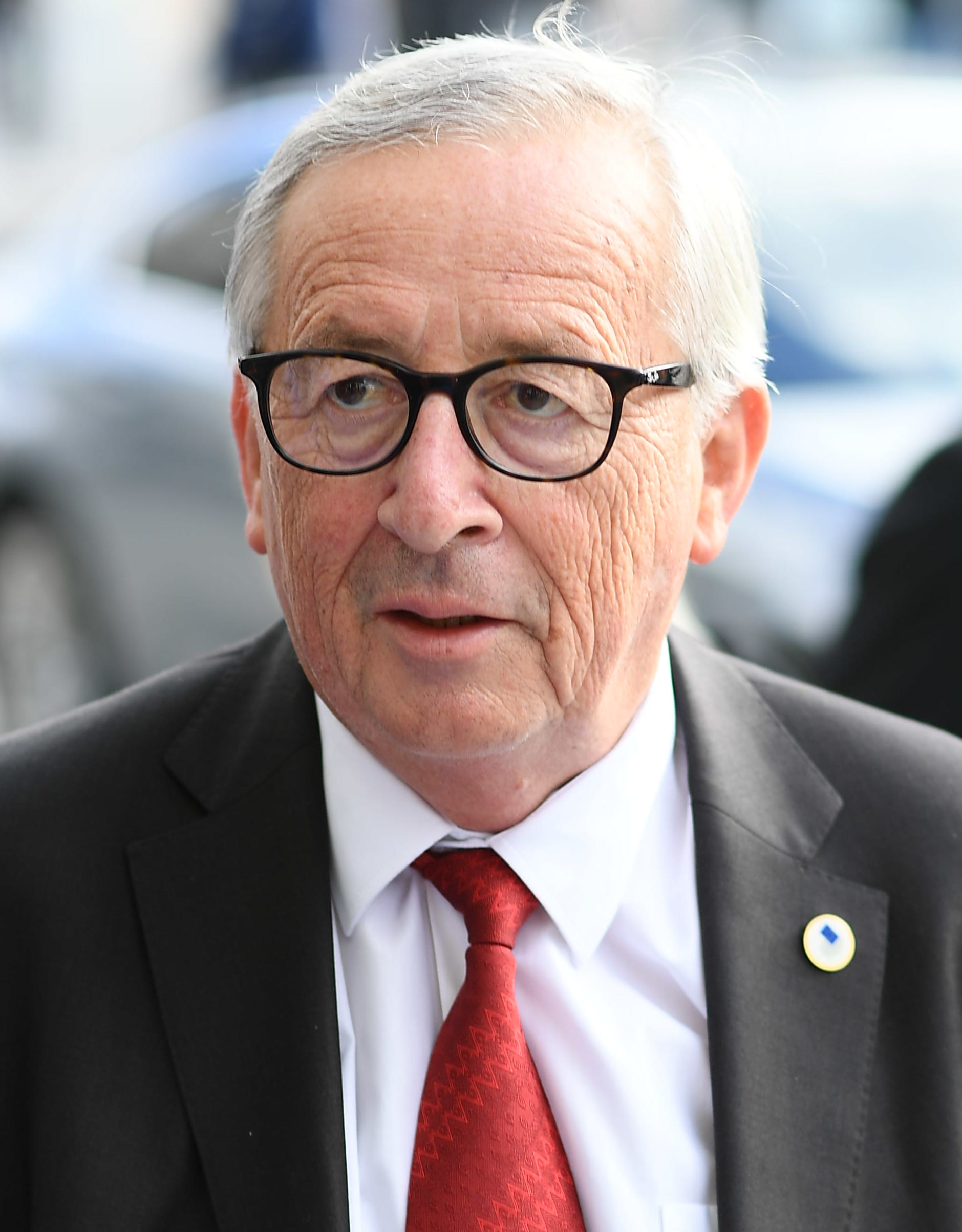
(European Union) European Union
Jean-Claude Juncker,
Commission President

=== Invited guests ===
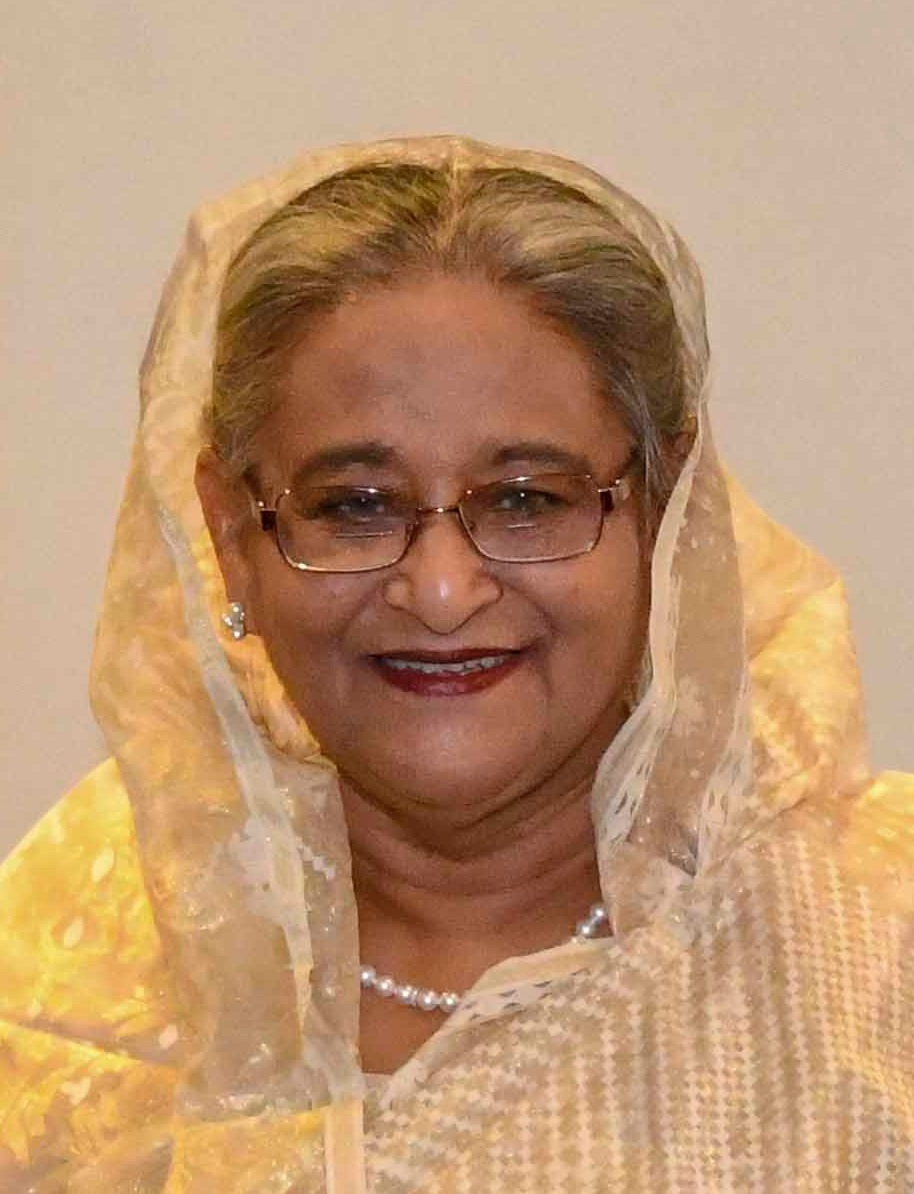
(Bangladesh) Bangladesh
Sheikh Hasina,
Prime Minister

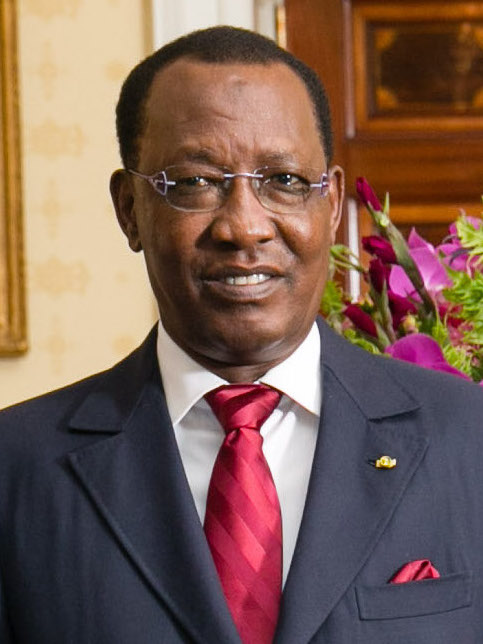
(Chad) Chad
Idriss Déby,
President

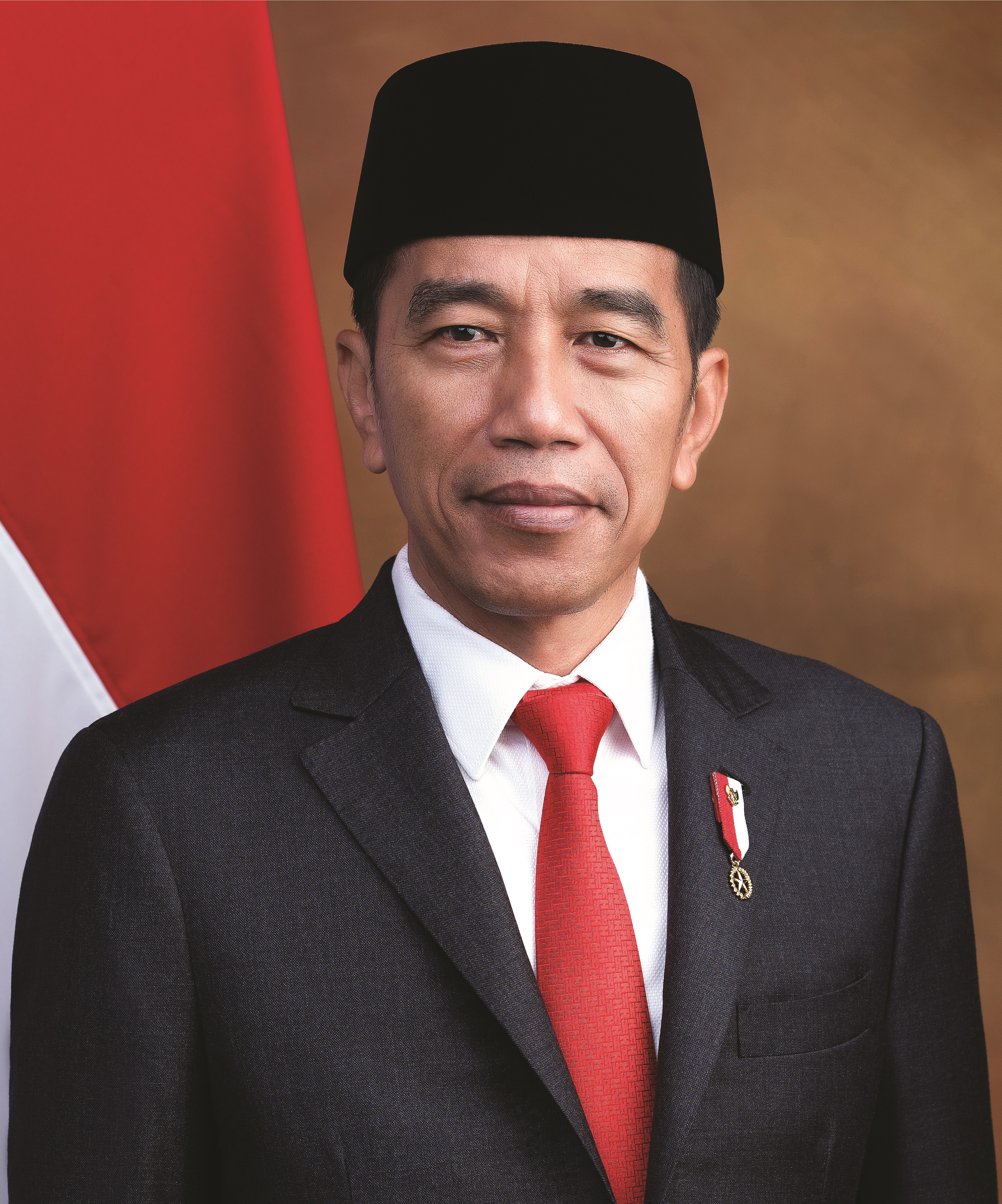
(Indonesia) Indonesia
Joko Widodo,
President

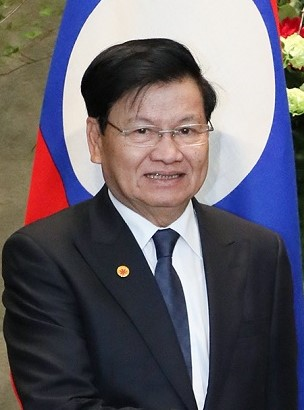
(Laos) Laos
Thongloun Sisoulith,
Prime Minister

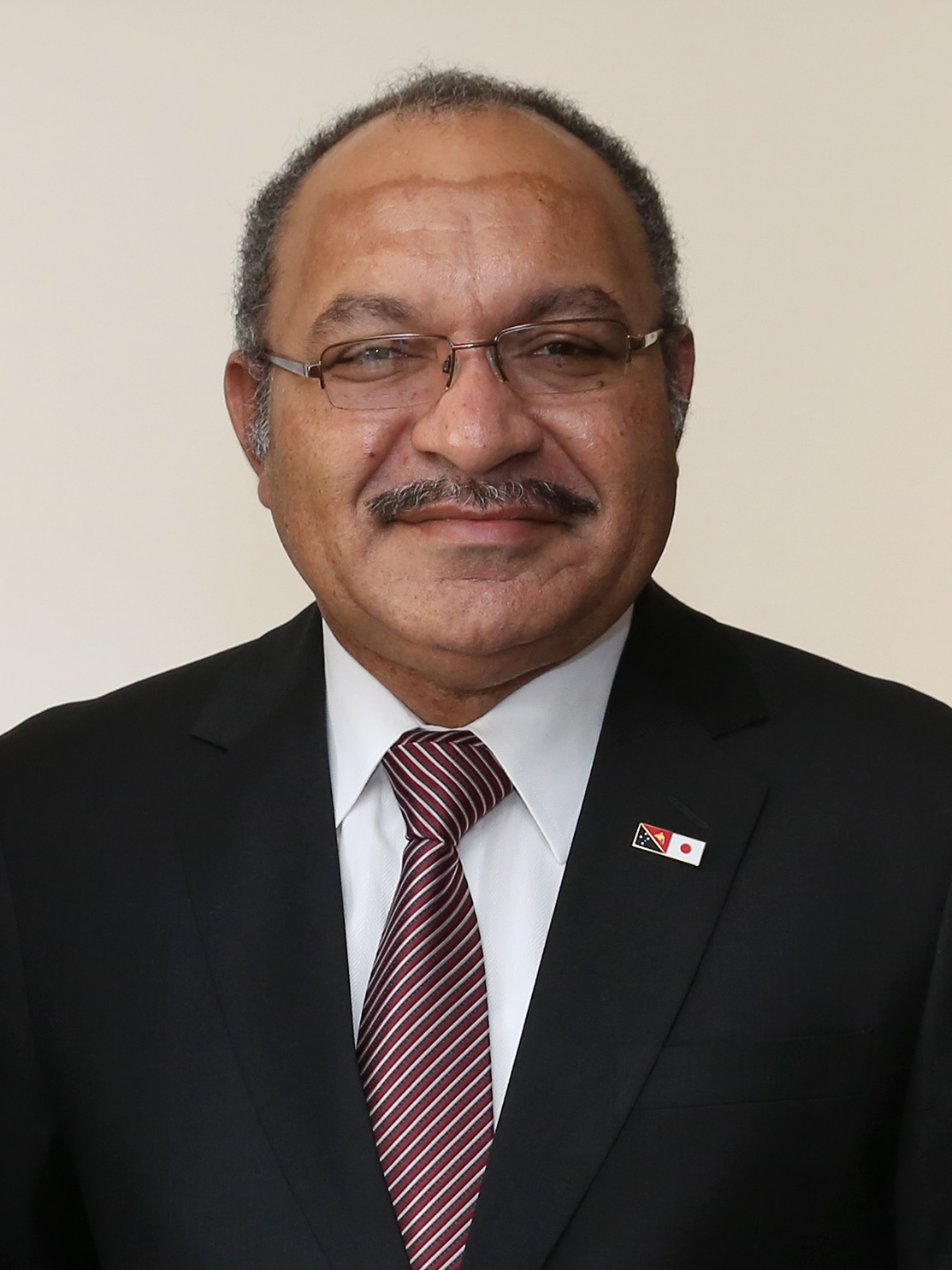
(Papua New Guinea) Papua New Guinea
Peter O'Neill,
Prime Minister

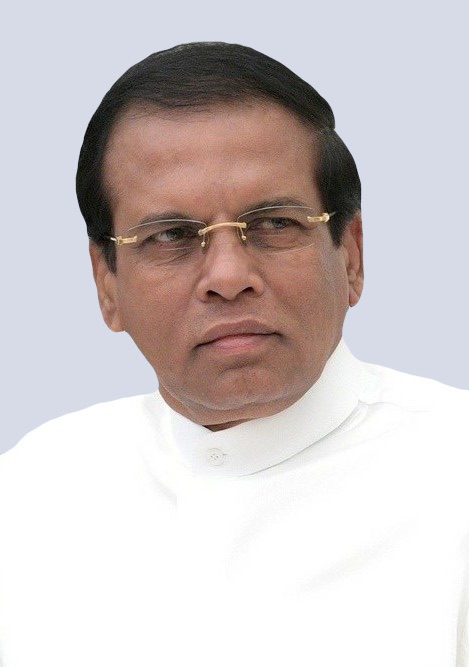
(Sri Lanka) Sri Lanka
Maithripala Sirisena,
President

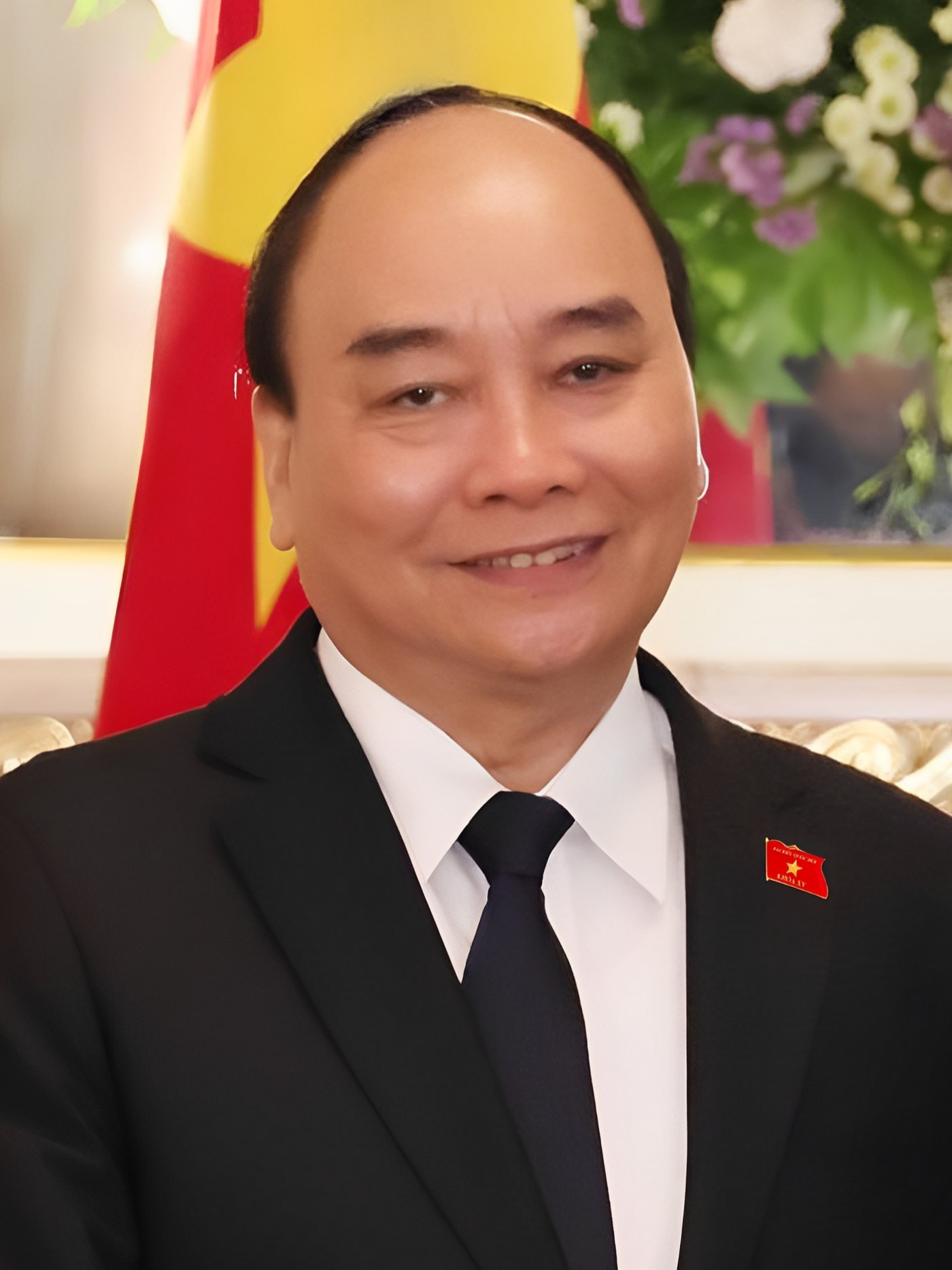
(Vietnam) Vietnam
Nguyễn Xuân Phúc,
Prime Minister

== See also ==
- G7 Kitakyushu Energy Ministerial Meeting
- G8
- Ise-Shima
- Ise-Shima National Park
