= Anorisaki Lighthouse =

Anori Saki Lighthouse 安乗埼灯台
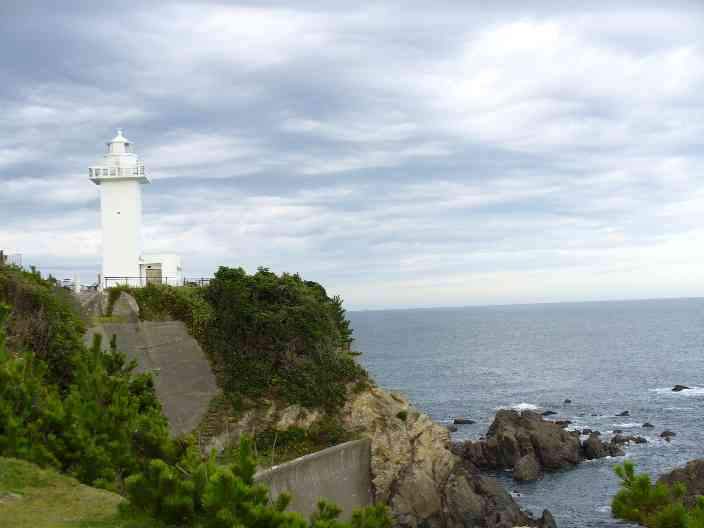
- Anori Saki Lighthouse
- Location: South of Shima; Mie Prefecture; Japan
- Coordinates: 34°21′54.5″N 136°54′30.9″E

Tower
- Constructed: 1 April 1873
- Foundation: concrete
- Construction: concrete tower
- Automated: October 1988
- Height: 12.7 metres (42 ft)
- Shape: square tower with balcony and lantern
- Markings: white tower and lantern
- Heritage: Registered Tangible Cultural Property of Japan

Light
- First lit: 1948 (current)
- Focal height: 33.3 metres (109 ft)
- Lens: Fourth Order Fresnel
- Intensity: 330,000 cd
- Range: 16.5 nautical miles (30.6 km; 19.0 mi)
- Characteristic: Fl W 15s.
- Japan no.: JCG-2769

Anorisaki Lighthouse (安乗埼灯台, Anorisaki tōdai) is a lighthouse on the top of Shima Peninsula in the city of Shima, Mie Prefecture, Japan.

== History ==
The Anorisaki Lighthouse was designed and constructed by British engineer Richard Henry Brunton. Work began in late 1871. It was first lit on April 1, 1873. It is the first lighthouse in Japan to use a rotating Fresnel lens. The octagonal structure was built of Zelkova serrata wood and had a total height of 10.6 metres.

During his career in Japan, Brunton constructed 25 lighthouses from far northern Hokkaidō to southern Kyūshū, each with a different design. Although Anorisaki Lighthouse was the 20th of the 25 built by Brunton, it was the oldest with a wooden construction.

Since its construction in the late 19th century, Anorisaki Lighthouse was relocated twice. The lighthouse was first relocated in 1911 due coastal erosion, being moved five miles further inland, and then again in 1948, when the original structure was replaced with a more modern design and relocated to the Museum of Maritime Science in Tokyo.

The modern replacement was completed in August 1948 and is a square ferro-concrete structure with a height of 12.7 metres. The lens was upgraded to a 4th order Fresnel in 1950.

The lighthouse was fully automated and has been unattended since October 1988. Since April 29, 2004, it has been open to the public for tours, with a small museum attached containing displays about the filming of the 1957 Japanese movie Times of Joy and Sorrow.

== See also ==
- List of lighthouses in Japan
