= Ise-Shima National Park =

National park in Kansai, Japan

- 伊勢志摩国立公園
- IUCN category II (national park)
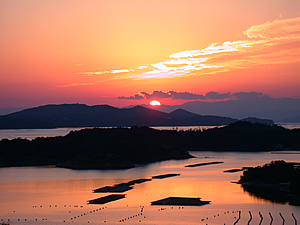
- Oyster beds in Ago Bay

- Location within Mie Prefecture Location within Japan
- Location: Honshū, Japan
- Nearest city: Ise, Mie
- Coordinates: 34°23′N 136°46′E
- Area: 555.44 km^{2} (214.46 mi^{2})
- Established: November 20, 1946

Ise-Shima National Park (伊勢志摩国立公園, Ise-Shima Kokuritsu Kōen) is a national park in Mie Prefecture, Japan. It is characterized by its ria coast and islands scattered around a number of bays. The interior is hilly with Mount Asama-ga-take (555 meters (1,821 ft)) the highest peak.

== Natural areas ==
- Ago Bay
- Kami-shima
- Kashiko-jima
- Kozukumi-jima
- Gokasho Bay
- Matoya Bay
- Mount Asama-ga-take 555 meters (1,821 ft)
- Tōshi-jima

== Cultural sites ==
- Ise Jingū
- Meoto Iwa
- Kongōshō-ji

== Related municipalities ==
- Ise
- Toba
- Shima
- Minami-Ise

== See also ==
- List of national parks of Japan
