= Times of Joy and Sorrow =

1957 Japanese film

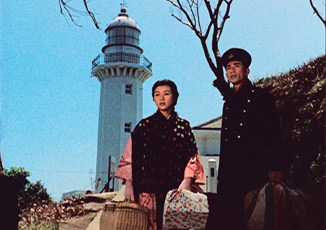
- Hideko Takamine and Keiji Sada
- Kanji: 喜びも悲しみも幾歳月
- Directed by: Keisuke Kinoshita
- Written by: Keisuke Kinoshita
- Produced by: Shochiku
- Cinematography: Hiroshi Kusuda
- Music by: Chuji Kinoshita
- Release date: 1 December 1957 (Japan)
- Running time: 162 minutes
- Country: Japan
- Language: Japanese

Times of Joy and Sorrow (喜びも悲しみも幾歳月, Yorokobi mo kanashimi mo ikutoshitsuki), also titled The Lighthouse in the UK, is a 1957 Japanese drama film written and directed by Keisuke Kinoshita.

== Plot ==
In 1932, a young lighthouse keeper returns from his father's funeral with a new bride, who quickly learns the importance of the marital bond to members of her husband's profession, which is often characterized by the hardships of physical isolation and sudden reassignment. Over the next 25 years they transfer to ten different lighthouses throughout Japan, raising two children and befriending multiple colleagues and their families. They endure wartime attacks on the strategically relevant lighthouses as well as a tragedy involving one of their children, ultimately celebrating the other's marriage and settling together into middle age.

== Cast ==
- Hideko Takamine as Kiyoko Arisawa
- Keiji Sada as Shiro Arisawa
- Takahiro Tamura as Mr. Nozu
- Katsuo Nakamura as Kotaro
- Yōko Katsuragi as Fuji Tatsuko
- Kōji Mitsui as Mr. Kanemaki
- Kuniko Igawa as Itoko Suzuki
- Shizue Natsukawa as Mrs. Natori
- Masako Arisawa as Yukino
- Hiroko Itō as Masako
- Noboru Nakaya as Shingo Natori
- Takeshi Sakamoto as Postmaster
- Ryūji Kita as Natori
- Mutsuko Sakura as Mrs. Kanemaki

== Featured Lighthouses ==
The film was shot on location at 10 different lighthouses throughout Japan, including opening scenes at Kannonzaki, the site of the country's first lighthouse.

- Kannonzaki Lighthouse - Miura Peninsula, Kanagawa
- Ishikari Lighthouse - Ishikari, Hokkaido
- Izu Oshima Lighthouse - Izu Ōshima, Izu Islands
- Mizunokojima Lighthouse - Bungo Channel, Oita
- Meshima Lighthouse - Gotō Islands, Nagasaki
- Hajiki Saki Lighthouse - Sado Island, Niigata
- Omaesaki Lighthouse - Omaezaki, Shizuoka
- Anorisaki Lighthouse - Shima, Mie
- Ogijima Lighthouse - Seto Inland Sea, Kagawa
- Hiyoriyama Lighthouse - Otaru, Hokkaido

== Legacy ==
Times of Joy and Sorrow has been remade three times for Japanese television, and in 1986 Kinoshita himself reworked it as Big Joys, Small Sorrows.

In 1993 a statue depicting the movie's two stars in an iconic pose from publicity materials was erected at Hajikizaki Lighthouse on Sato Island, one of the filming sites, as a tribute to lighthouse staff nationwide.

== Home media ==
Although the film has not been released on disc or for streaming in the United States, Kinoshita's remake Big Joys, Small Sorrows was among the inaugural films available in Spring 2019 for streaming on The Criterion Channel.
