= G7 Kitakyushu Energy Ministerial Meeting =

- Host country: Japan
- Date: 1–2 May 2016
- Venues: RIHGA Royal Hotel Kokura; Kokura-kita, Kitakyushu, Japan
- Participants: Canada; France; Germany; Italy; Japan; United Kingdom; United States; European Union

The G7 Kitakyushu Energy Ministerial Meeting is one of the related Ministerial Meetings of the Ise-Shima Summit which was held on 1–2 May 2016 in Kitakyushu, Japan.

== Site of the Meeting ==
On July 3, 2015, Yoichi Miyazawa, the Minister of Economy, Trade and Industry, made the following statement after it had been decided that the G7 Energy Ministerial Meeting was to be held in Kitakyushu City . “Ever since the establishment of the Imperial Steel Works, Kitakyushu City has continued to develop as a hub for heavy chemical industries, and has been a driving force in promoting the modernization of Japanese industry and the country’s rapid economic growth. At present, the city is at the forefront of energy-related policies, making it a most suitable venue for the G7 Energy Ministerial Meeting.”

Kitakyushu City is making great efforts towards the development of energy distribution systems for the realization of a recycling oriented society and is a pioneer on the global stage in policy related to energy and the environment. Such efforts include the "Smart Community Creation Project" which utilizes information and communications technology (ICT) to promote the efficient distribution of renewable energy and hydrogen energy within the area.

In 2011, the city was recognized by the Organization for Economic Cooperation and Development (OECD) for its pioneering efforts in environmental policy; including its history of overcoming pollution and the implementation of the Kitakyushu Eco-Town project. The city was selected as one of four Green Growth Model Cities by the OECD alongside the cities of Paris, Chicago and Stockholm.

In May 2015, ‘The Kitakyushu Smart Community Creation Project’ was selected as a finalist in the 2014 ISGAN Awards. It was chosen as a finalist from a selection of forty projects spanning fifteen countries, and was the only finalist from the Asia region.

== Press Tour ==
In March 2016, The Foreign Press Center Japan (FPCJ) organized a press tour to Kitakyushu under the title of "The Front Line of the Future of Energy Use in Japan".
