= G7 ministerial meetings =

G7 and (from 1997 to 2014) G8 ministerial meetings are meetings of the government ministers of the G7 and G8 countries. G7 summit meetings originated in an ad hoc gathering of finance ministers in 1973.

Meetings of finance ministers, labour and employment ministers, environment ministers, foreign ministers and trade ministers and other ad hoc ministerial meetings have taken place within the country designated for the annual G7 or G8 summit. As of 2021, seven G7 "Ministerial Tracks" cover economic, environmental, health, trade, technology, development and foreign policy issues.

== Digital technology ministers ==
The digital technology ministers of the G7 countries met in Paris on 15 May 2019, during the French G7 presidency. Ministers from India, Australia, New Zealand and Chile and representatives of the OECD, International Telecommunication Union (ITU) and UNESCO also attended. A draft of the Charter for an Open, Free and Safe Internet was discussed at the meeting. This was subsequently signed by six of the G7 members, but not by the United States.

== Energy ministers ==
The G7 Kitakyushu Energy Ministerial Meeting took place in Kitakyushu, Japan on 1–2 May 2016. Climate, energy and environment ministers met on 15–16 April 2023 in Sapporo, also in Japan.

== Foreign ministers ==
G7 foreign ministers met in Capri in April 2024 and again in Fiuggi in November 2024.

== Health ministers ==
G7 health ministers met in June and November 2021, the latter being an urgent meeting called by the U.K. presidency to discuss developments relating to the spread of the Omicron COVID-19 variant. A G7 health ministers' meeting was held in Nagasaki, Japan in May 2023.

== Labour and employment ministers ==
From 11 to 13 May 2008, in advance of the G8 summit in Tōyako, Hokkaido in July 2008, the Labour and Employment Ministers of the G8 countries and the EU Commissioner for Employment, Social Affairs and Equal Opportunities held a ministerial meeting in Niigata, Japan. With the additional participation of the Director-General of the ILO (Juan Somavía) and the Secretary-General of the OECD (Ángel Gurría), and Labour Ministers from Indonesia and Thailand invited as guests, the aim of the meeting was to discuss "the best balance for a resilient and sustainable society".

Three themes were addressed:

- Enabling Well-Balanced Lives in Harmony with Increased Longevity (individual level)
- The Contribution of Labour Market and Employment Policies to Addressing the Needs of Vulnerable Workers and Areas (society level)
- The Contribution of the G8 Members to the Challenges to Global Sustainability (global society level).

As a result of these discussions a principle referred to as the "Niigata Global-Balance Principle" was adopted, which set out a recognition that:

Governments, employers and workers should work together to achieve a coherent balance of growth, employment, productivity and concern for the environment. Social dialogue and cooperation beginning at the workplace makes an important contribution to this goal.

More recently, labour and employment ministers met in Wolfsburg, Germany, in May 2022 (their first meeting after the COVID-19 pandemic interrupted the cycle of meetings); Kurashiki, Japan, in April 2023; and Cagliari, Italy, from 11 to 13 September 2024. The three main topics covered at the 2024 meeting are:

- human-centered development and the use of artificial intelligence within work,
- resilient labour markets in ageing societies, and
- responsive, flexible and inclusive skills and lifelong learning policies and systems.

== Trade ministers ==
The G7 trade ministers held their first meeting on 31 March 2021.

== See also ==
- 52nd G7 summit#Preparatory meetings: lists the ministerial meetings held in advance of the principal G7 summit of June 2026
