= Matoya Bay =

Bay in Mie Prefecture, Japan

Coordinates: 34°22′22″N 136°53′17″E

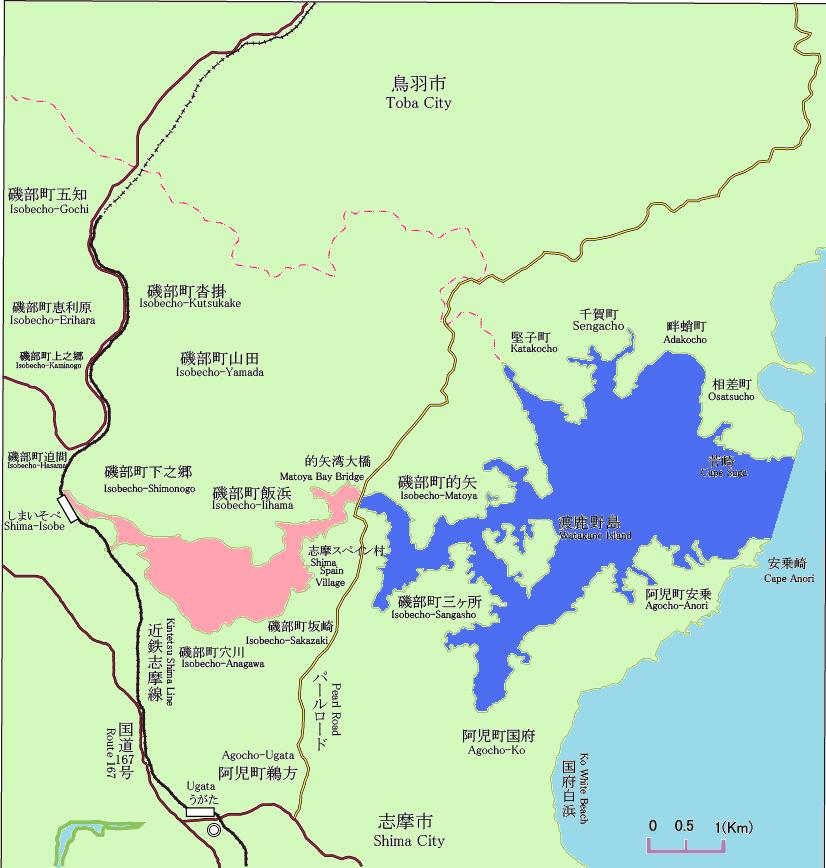
Matoya Bay

Matoya Bay (的矢湾, Matoya-wan) is a bay in the city of Shima and Toba, Mie Prefecture, Japan. It is part of the Ise-Shima region.

The bay is known for cultivation of oyster in Japan.
