= Ago Bay =

Bay in Mie Prefecture, Japan

Coordinates: 34°17′02″N 136°47′23″E

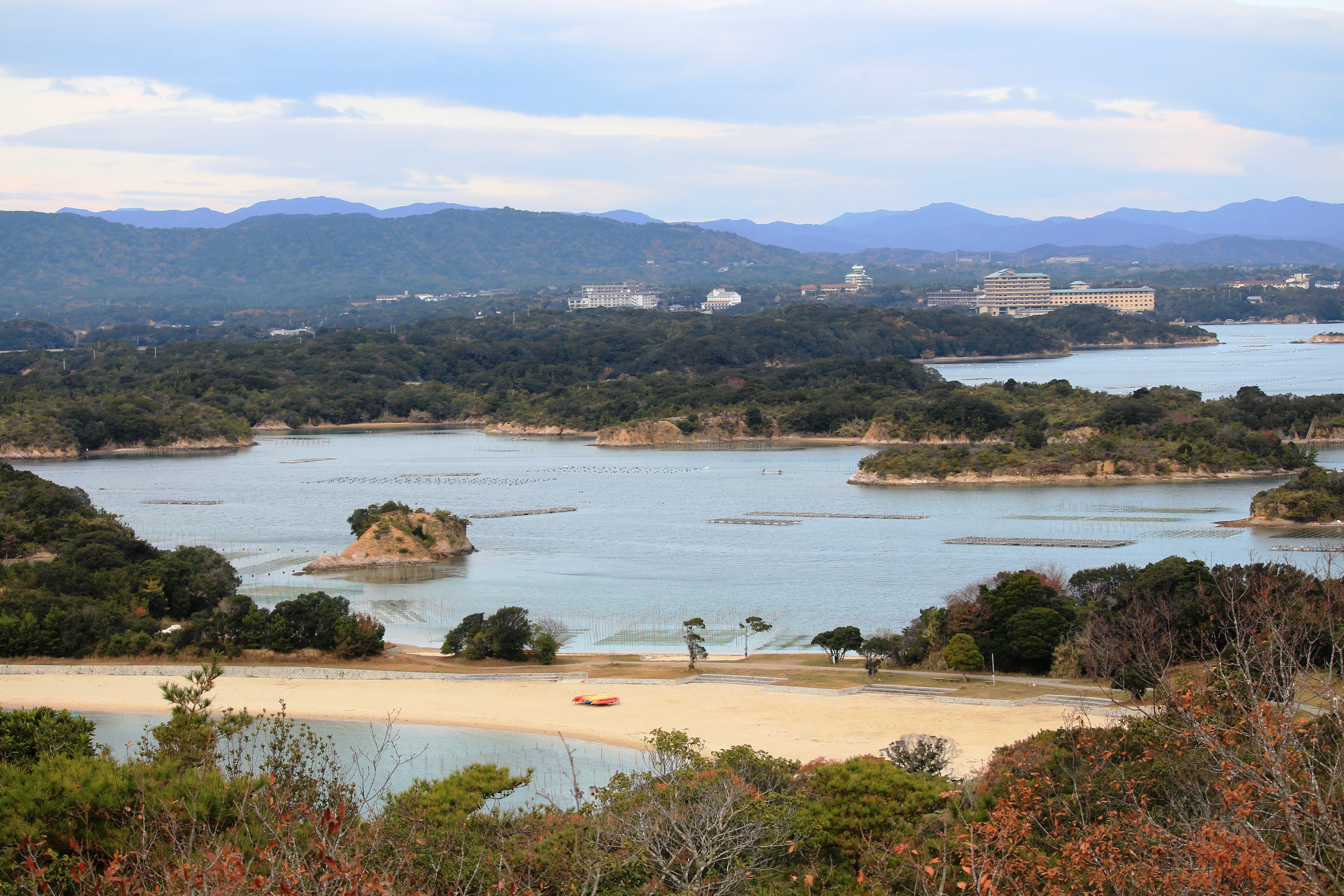
Jirōrokurō Beach in Ago Bay

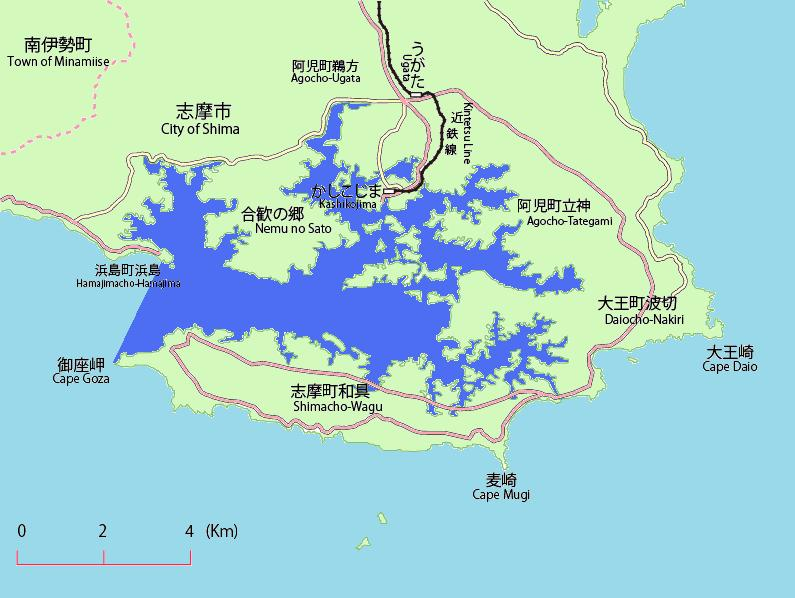
Map of Ago Bay

Ago Bay (英虞湾, Ago-wan) is a bay in the city of Shima, Mie Prefecture, Japan. It is part of the Ise-Shima region and is one of three marine environments in Shima.

The bay sees many tourists each year, in particular due to a train network owned by Kintetsu which runs trains from both Osaka and Nagoya to Kashiko-jima, an island in the bay.

== History ==
The Ago Bay area was originally known as "Miketsu-kuni," an allusion to its status as a food source for the surrounding community.

Pearl cultivation was first invented in the bay by Kōkichi Mikimoto in 1893. The cultured pearl industry soon took root in the area. However, in the 1900s, environmental degradation affected the bay's marine life. Development of the surrounding land and the construction of concrete dikes cut into the area's tidal flats. In addition, a red tide of Heterocapsa circularisquama blooms in 1992 killed off much of the pearl oyster population, and an uptick in hypoxia wiped out more marine life in the 1990s and in 2002.

The Committee for the Promotion of Environmental Restoration in Ago Bay was founded by scientists and government officials in 2008 to attempt to reverse this environmental damage. This led to a large-scale tidal flat restoration project in 2009, centered on a 2-hectare area of the bay near Ishibuchi in Shima. This was the first tidal flat restoration project in Japan at the time. A flap gate was opened in the dike to increase water flow, clams were stocked, and seagrasses were planted. A public education program was also put into place, and students in nearby schools sampled and observed the changes in marine life.

As of 2006, Ago Bay and surrounding areas made up one-third of Japan's cultured pearl production.
