= Haruka No. 2 =

Japanese musician (born 2001)

Haruka No. 2 はるか2号
- Born: Haruka Tsujino; May 6, 2001 (age 24); Shima, Mie, Japan
- Instrument: Recorder
- Years active: 2019–present

X information
- Handle: @haruka_2go
- Display name: はるか2号👃
- Years active: 2019–present
- Followers: 12, 100

YouTube information
- Channel: はるか2号[準備中]
- Years active: 2019–present
- Subscribers: 165,000
- Views: 28.18 million
- Last updated: February 23, 2026

Haruka Tsujino (Japanese: 辻野悠香, Hepburn: Tsujino Haruka; born May 6, 2001), professionally known as Haruka No. 2 (はるか2号, Haruka 2-gō), is a Japanese musician. She is well known for covering songs using her nose.

== Biography ==
Haruka Tsujino was born on May 6, 2001, in Shima, Mie. She graduated from Koka Elementary School, she graduated from middle school at Tokai Junior High School. She graduated from Suzuka National College of Technology. She said that she started uploading videos after her friend advised her to upload her video to Twitter after sending a video of herself playing on recorder using her nose. She started playing recorder using her nose in summer of 2019 after trying to do a duet using her mouth but she found it difficult, but when she tried to playing with her nose, it was good.

She became viral after uploading her cover version of Yoasobi's "Yoru ni Kakeru" on both Twitter and YouTube. The cover features her playing a recorder using her nose.

She auditioned in Got Talent España in June 2025, where she played "Viva España" using her nose.

== Artistry ==
She plays two recorders using her nose. She plays an alto recorder using her left nostril, while she plays a soprano recorder using her right nostril. The right recorder plays the high-pitched main melody, and the left plays the low-pitched sub-melody creating a duet.

== Personal life ==
She is ranked nidan in karate. She started learning karate when she was in first grade. She said that she uses karate to strengthen her lung capacity to help her breathe through her nose. She dreams of performing in Tokyo Dome.
