= Conference on Dialogue of Asian Civilizations =

2019 conference of Asian governments

Conference on Dialogue of Asian Civilizations 亚洲文明对话大会
- Date: 15 May 2019
- Locations: Beijing, China
- Website: 亚洲文明对话大会官网

The Conference on Dialogue of Asian Civilizations was an Asian cultural exchange conference hosted by China. It opened in Beijing on May 15, 2019, with the theme of "Exchange and Mutual Learning among Asian Civilizations and a Community with a Shared Future".

== Attending leaders ==
Attendees include heads of state and government from China, Cambodia, Greece, Singapore, Sri Lanka, Armenia, Mongolian leaders, and heads of international organizations such as UNESCO. More than 2,000 government officials and representatives from 47 Asian countries and other countries outside the region attended the opening ceremony and sub-forums of the conference.

== Conference content ==
On May 4, 2019, Beijing released "Asia Meets in Beijing" for the Conference on Dialogue of Asian Civilizations

The conference included:

- Opening Ceremony
- Asian Culture Carnival
- Six parallel sessions
- Asian Civilization Week

During the conference, Chinese leader Xi Jinping stated "If someone thinks their own race and civilisation is superior and insists on remoulding or replacing other civilisations, it would be a stupid idea and disastrous act".
