= Iran–Sri Lanka relations =

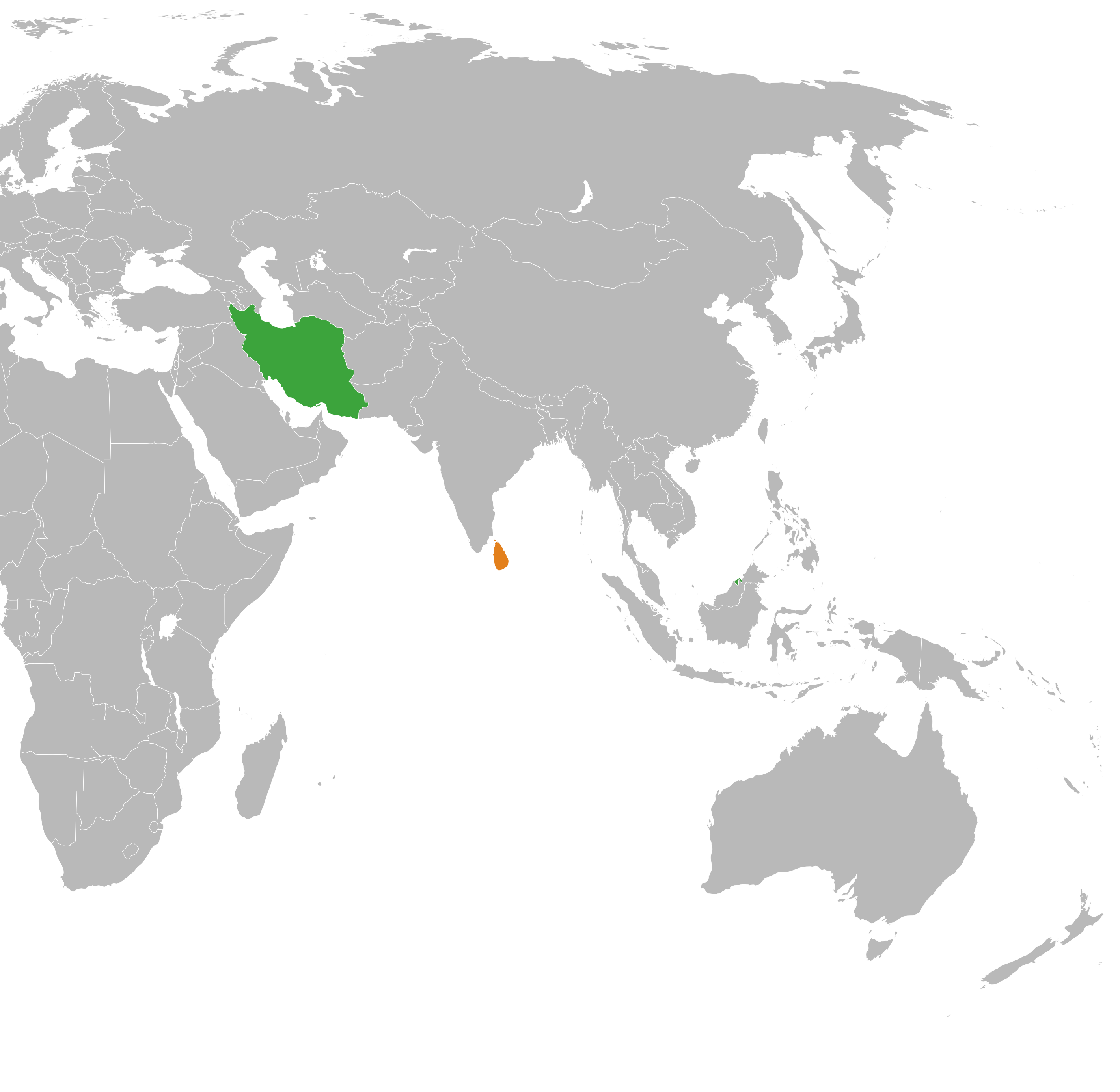

- Iran: Sri Lanka

Diplomatic mission
- Embassy of Iran, Colombo: Embassy of Sri Lanka, Tehran

Iran and Sri Lanka have had official diplomatic relations since 1961.

== History ==
Diplomatic relations between Iran (then known as Pahlavi Iran) and Sri Lanka (then known as Ceylon) began in 1961 via the Ceylonese embassy in Islamabad, which was the closest Ceylon had to a presence on Iranian soil until the opening of the Tehran embassy office in 1990. Tehran set up its Colombo office in 1975.

After Mahmoud Ahmadinejad became President of Iran, Sri Lanka was the first country he visited on his inaugural Asian tour. Mahinda Rajapaksa also made ties with Iran a priority after he ascended to office.

In 2024 April, Despite the tension in the Middle East, President of Iran Ebrahim Raisi visited to Sri Lanka for the inauguration of Uma Oya Hydropower Complex. Sri Lanka and Iran signed 5 agreements during this visit.

== Development and Trade ==
Iran has helped fund a number of development projects in Sri Lanka. In 2010 they agreed to post US$450-500 million for the Uma Oya Multipurpose Development Project, a 90-100 megawatt hydroelectric power plant around the Central Province. Iran has also invested in Sri Lankan Oil refineries and its investments have helped to double Sri Lankan Oil production capacity. Iran has also invested in rural electrification. These projects have made Iran Sri Lanka's largest aid donor.

Iran has been one of the top Ceylon Tea buyers from the Middle East.

== Military ==
During the Sri Lankan Civil War the Government of Sri Lanka approached Iran for loans at low interest to afford Sri Lanka purchases of electronic surveillance aircraft and unmanned aerial vehicles after a particularly daring attack on the Sri Lankan Air Force by the Liberation Tigers of Tamil Eelam. Iran agreed covertly to issue the loan and also invited selected Sri Lankan officers to train in Iran for the war. Analysts have termed Iran's aggressive courting of Sri Lanka's military capacity as a geostragetic implication of Iran's "Look east" strategy. For Iran's assistance in the Sri Lankan Civil War, Sri Lankan minister Wimal Weerawansa said that: "Iran has never let us down, even when many other countries in the world refused to back us. The county as a whole is very grateful for this brotherly treatment".

== 2026 Iran war ==
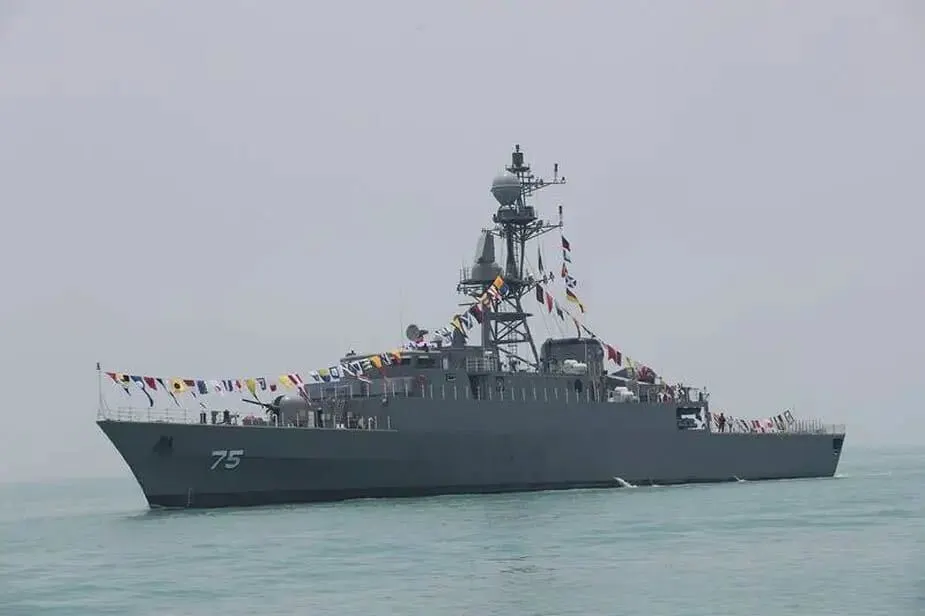
IRIS Dena dressed overall

During the Sinking of IRIS Dena, a total of thirty-two survivors were rescued by the Sri Lanka Navy. The rescued personnel were subsequently transported to the Galle National Hospital, where they received medical treatment for exhaustion and blast-related injuries.

Subsequent to this incident, a second Iranian naval vessel, IRIS Bushehr, belonging to the Bandar Abbas class, requested permission to enter the Port of Colombo. Following discussions with Iranian authorities through the Embassy of Iran in Colombo, and in consideration of the potential risk of a further United States attack, the Government of Sri Lanka authorized the Sri Lanka Navy to intern the vessel along with its crew, numbering 208 personnel.

It was further reported that the Government of Sri Lanka declined a request from the United States to permit the landing of two US military aircraft at Mattala Rajapaksa International Airport.

On March 24th, the Iranian ambassador to Colombo reaffirmed Iran’s commitment to supporting Sri Lanka, stating that despite tensions in the Strait of Hormuz, it remains open to friendly countries like Sri Lanka and that Iran remains ready to supply essential resources, including oil, if needed. He also expressed appreciation for the Sri Lankan government’s hospitality and humanitarian assistance provided to the surviving crew and cadets. Sri Lanka thanked Iran's offer but noted as it had no vessels, importing oil by itself was impossible.

== See also ==
- Foreign relations of Iran
- Foreign relations of Sri Lanka
