= Asia Corporation Dialogue Summit =

Asia Corporation Dialogue Summit also known as ACD Summit is one of the main summits attained by leaders of Asia. Summit began in 2001 as a ministerial-level summit, but in 2014 summit converted to a head of state level. Inaugurated in June 2002 in Cha-Am, Thailand, with 34 founding member nations.

== List of meetings ==
Year	Date	Country	City	Chairperson
2015	15–17 October	Kuwait	Kuwait city	Abah Al Ahmad Al Jaber Al Sabah
2016	8–10 October	Thailand	Bangkok	Prayut Chan-o-cha
