= Kashiko Island =

Island in Ago Bay, Mie, Japan

Coordinates: 34°18′30″N 136°49′7″E

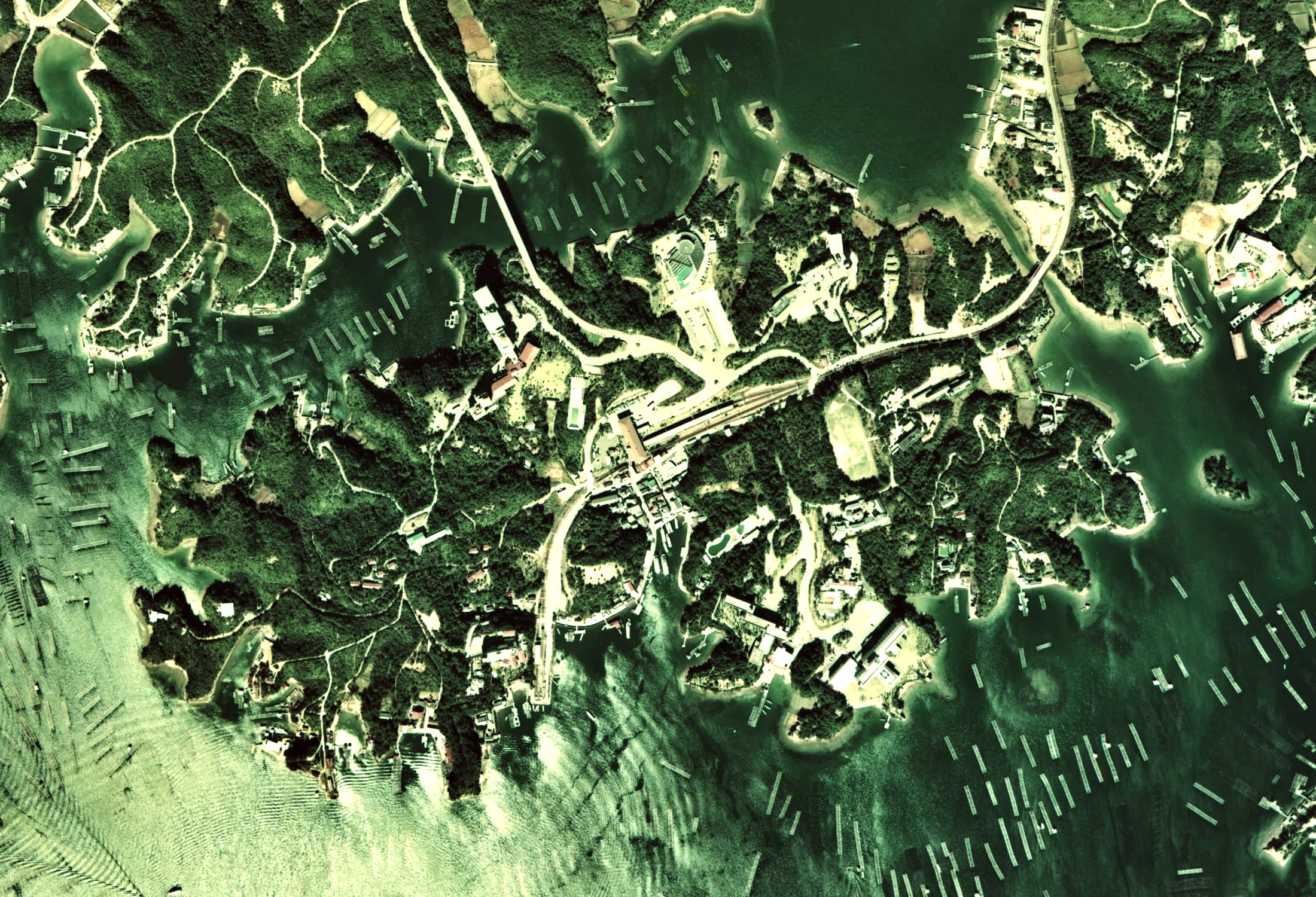
Kashiko Island from National Land Image Information (color aerial photographs), Ministry of Land, Infrastructure, Transport and Tourism

Kashiko Island (賢島, Kashiko-jima) is an island in Ago Bay. It is in the city of Shima, Mie Prefecture, Japan.

Although human presence in the Jōmon period has been attested, the island was uninhabited until 1929, when a railway built by Shima Electric Railway (now known as the Shima Line) was constructed to serve as the endpoint of the line. This railway sparked the creation of a tourism industry that still thrives. Kintetsu runs limited express trains from Osaka and Nagoya directly to this island and has many business enterprises there.

The surface area of the island is 0.66 square kilometres (0.25 sq mi) and the circumference is 7.3 kilometres (4.5 mi), making it the largest island in the Ago Bay. Along with Masaki Island, it is one of the only two inhabited islands in the bay.

Kashiko Island hosted the 42nd G7 summit in May 2016.

== Gallery ==
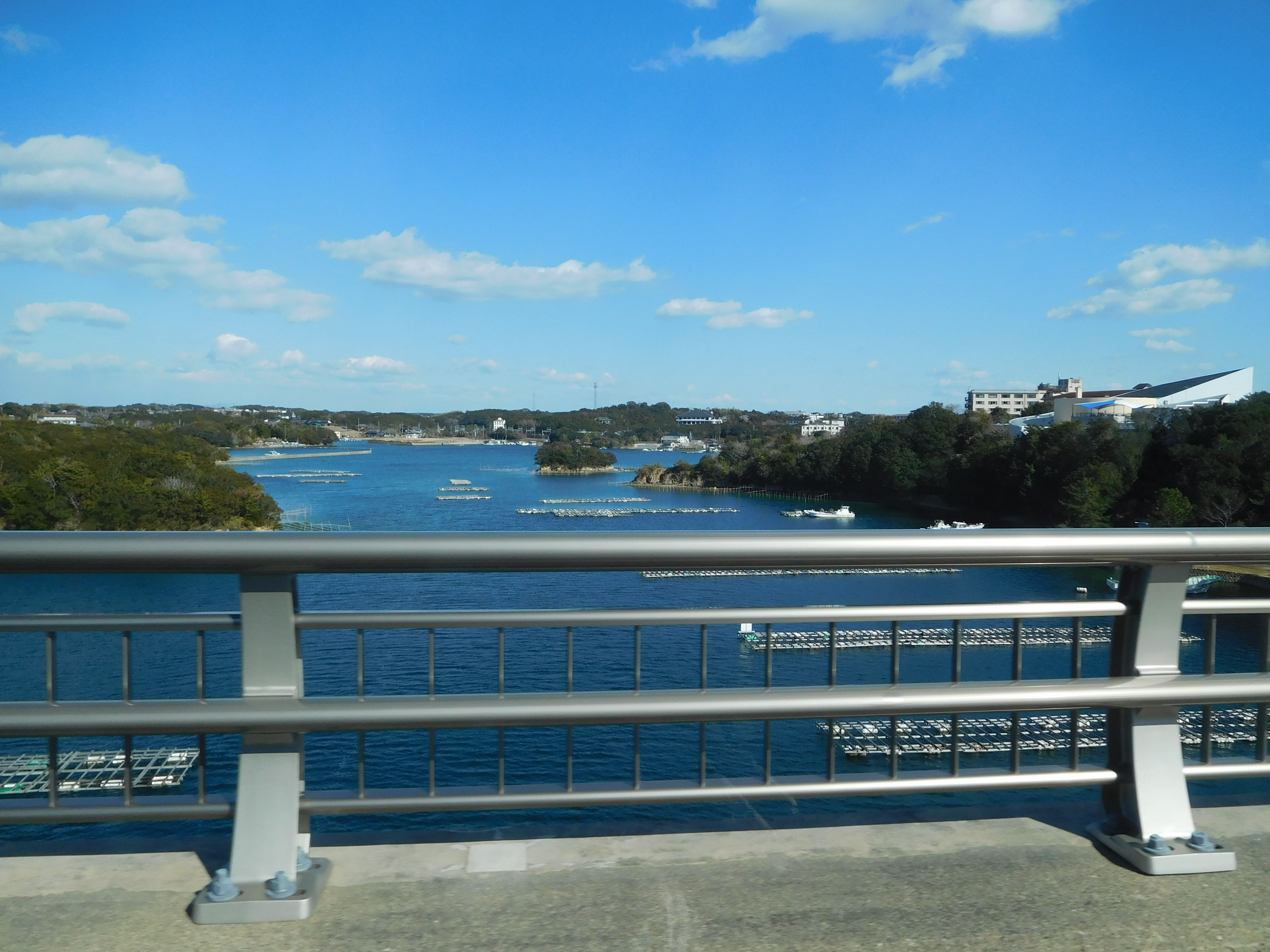
Kashiko Island Great Bridge
Kashiko Island is on the right.

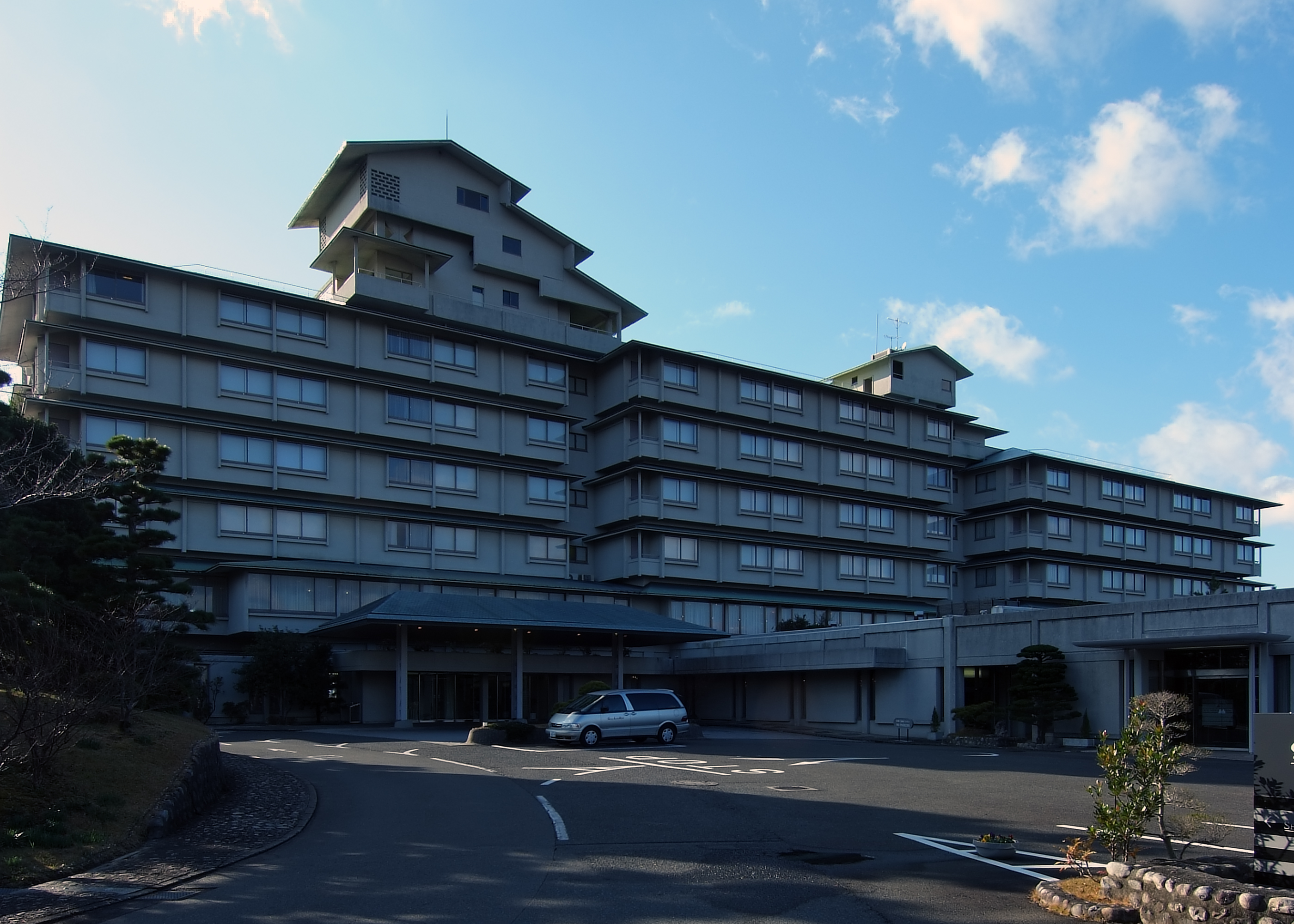
Shima Kanko Hotel Classic

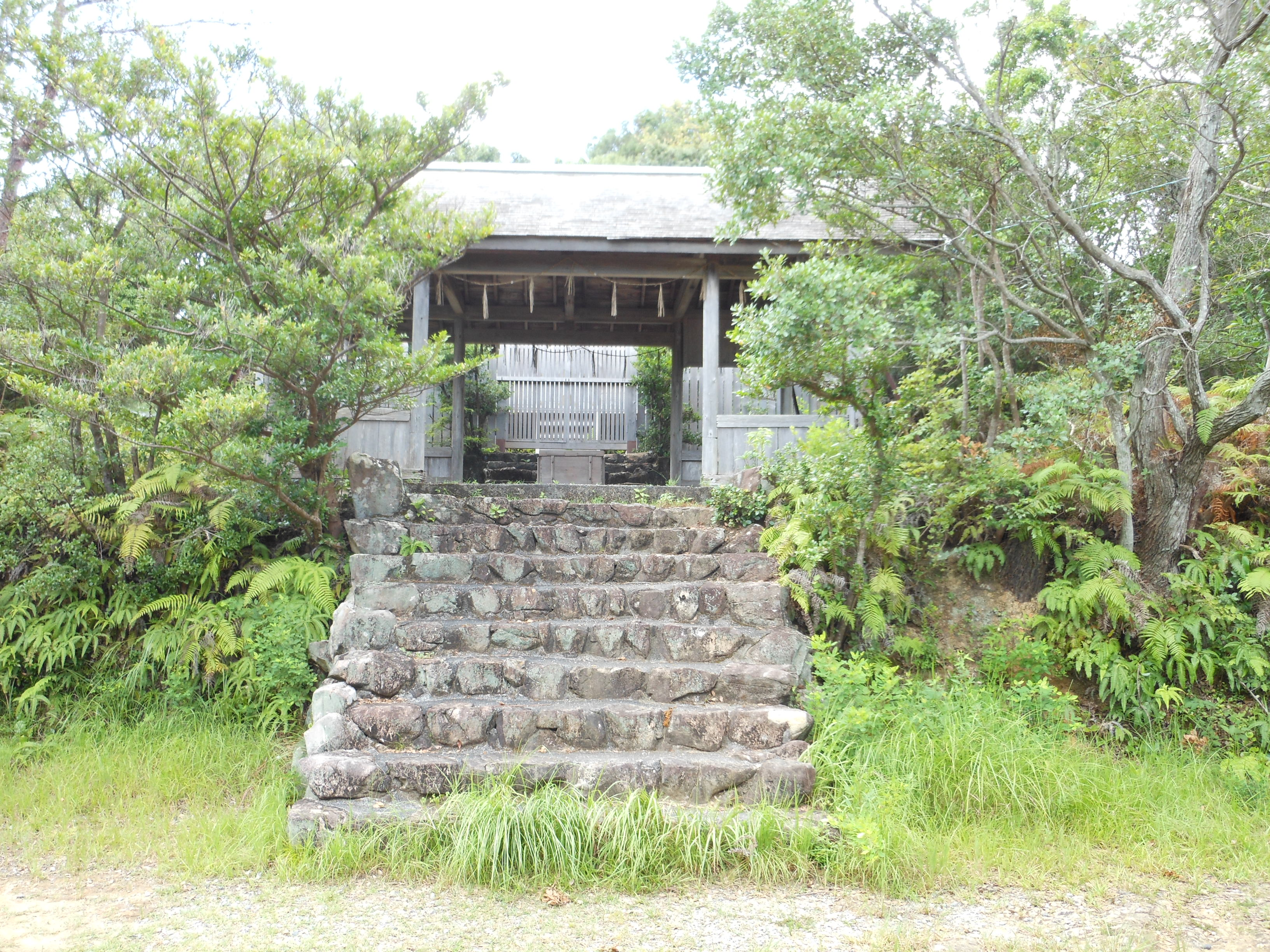
Kompira Shrine

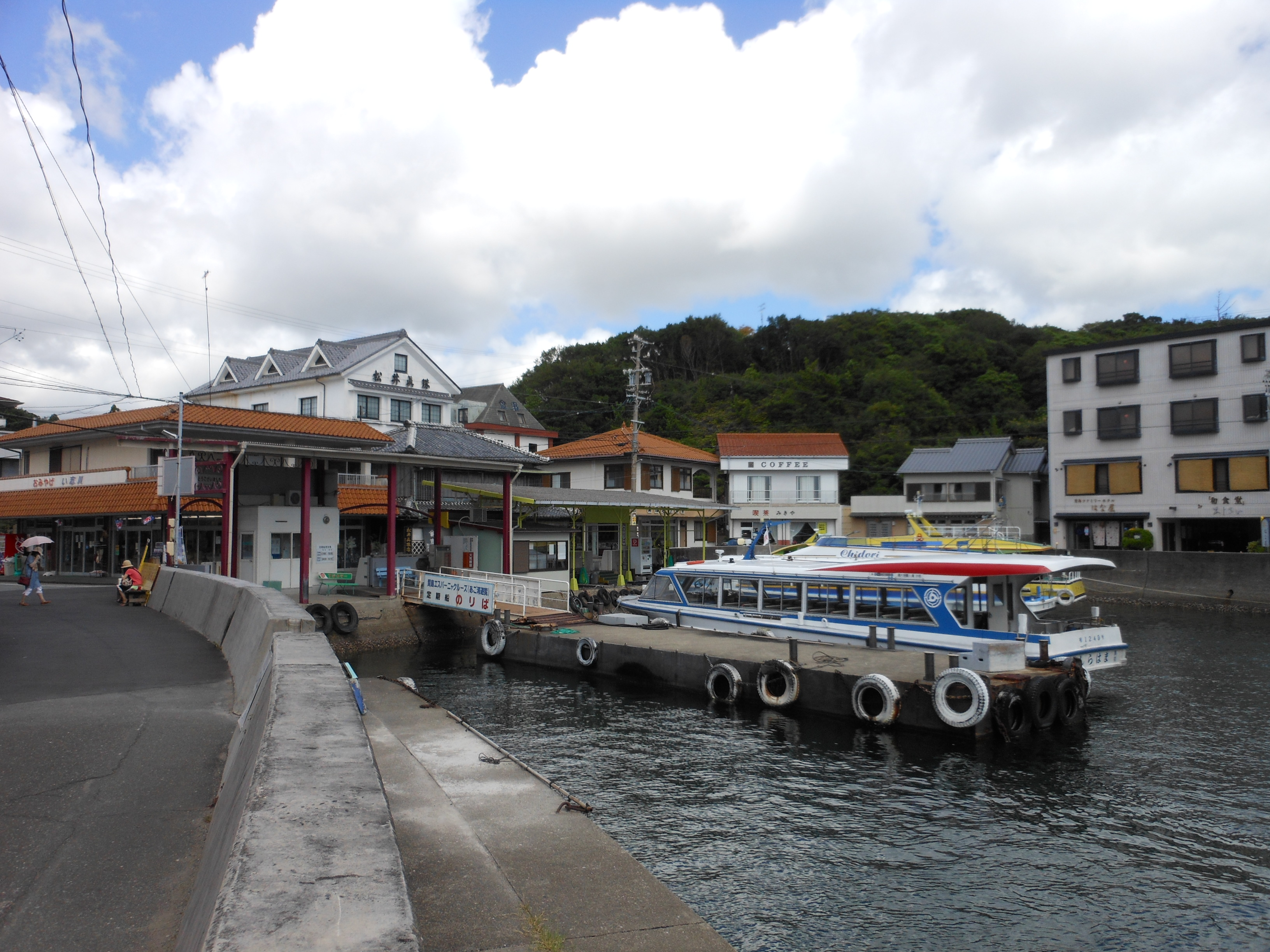
Port of Kashikojima

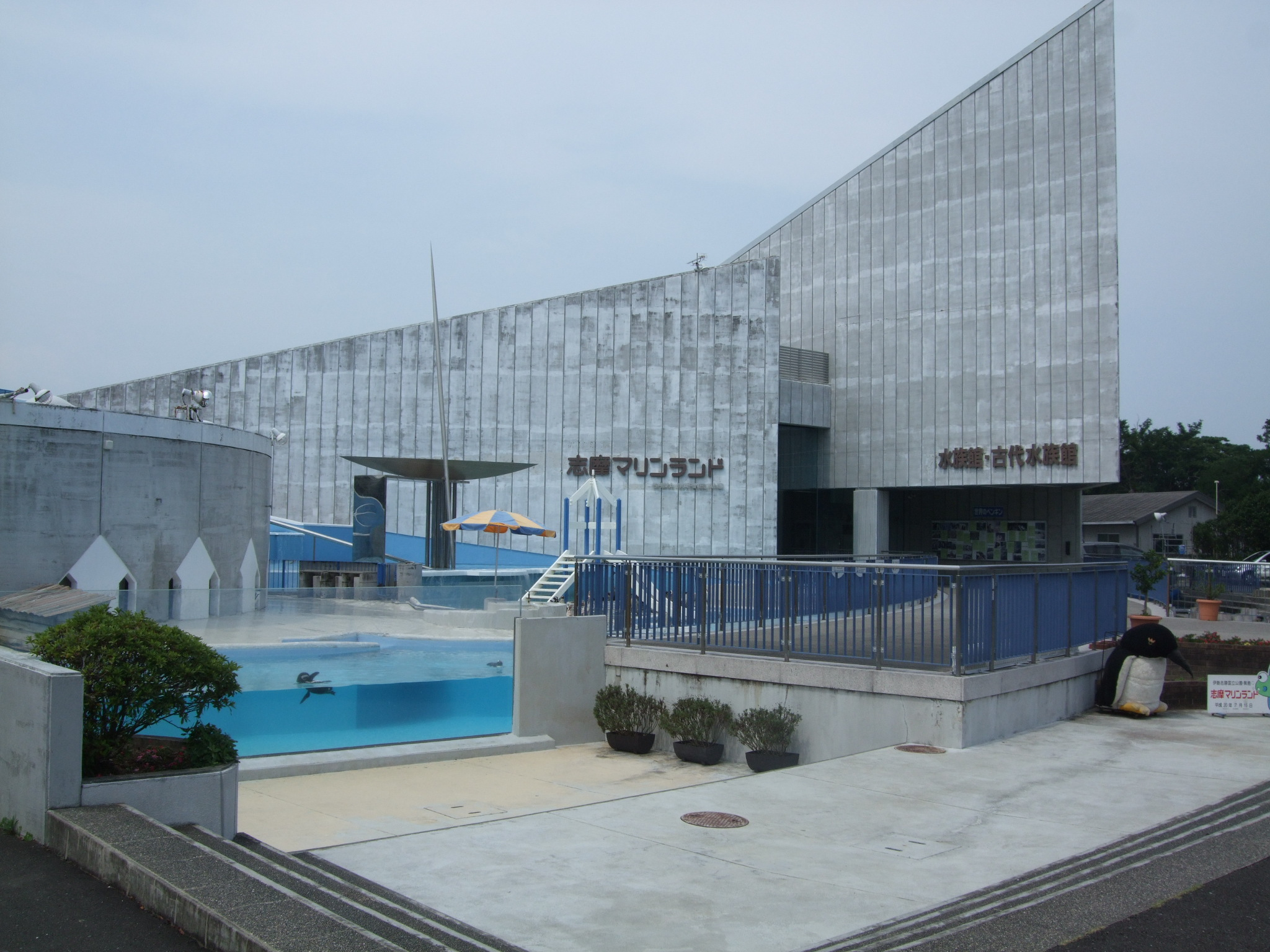
Shima Marine Land

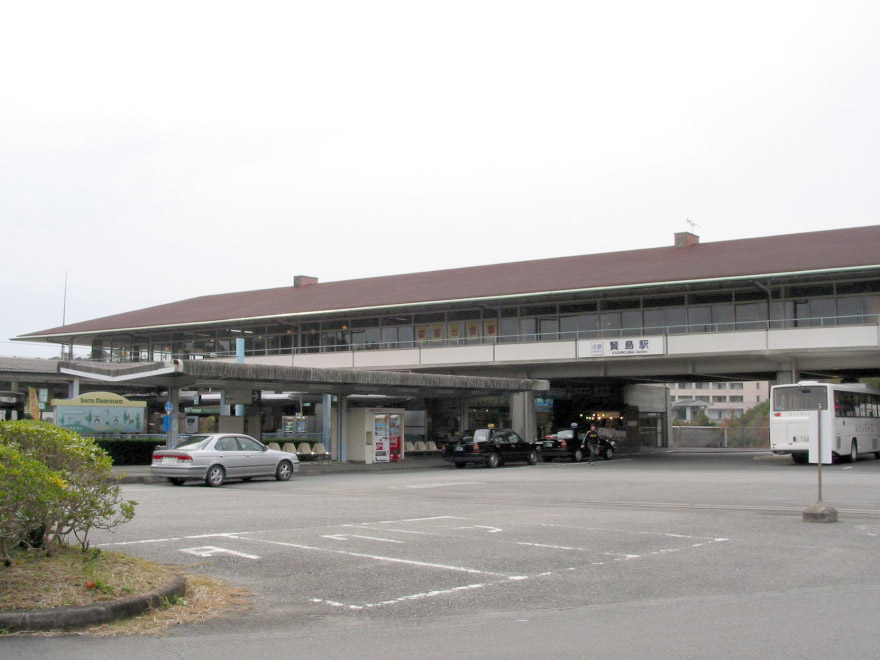
North wing of Kashikojima Station
