= Ise-Shima =

Region of Japan

The Ise-Shima (伊勢志摩) region of Japan, also called the Shima Peninsula (志摩半島, Shima-hantō), refers to the areas of eastern Mie Prefecture in or around Ise-Shima National Park, which include the cities Ise, Toba, Shima, and parts of the town of Minami-Ise. The area thrives on tourism, with many resort hotels and beaches in the area. Ise-Shima is also famed for fresh seafood, particular oysters.

The peninsula extends out into the Pacific Ocean, and unlike the factory-dotted coast of Ise Bay, the main industry is seafood and marine products, particularly pearl cultivation.

== Locations ==
Tourism in the Ise-Shima region is fueled primarily by these locations:

- Ise Grand Shrine
- Meoto Iwa
- Mikimoto Pearl Island
- Toba Aquarium
- Shima Spain Village

== Access ==
Direct service is available to Ise-Shima from both Osaka and Nagoya via Kintetsu limited express trains.

== In popular culture ==
- The author Mayumi Inaba's book Hantō e (半島へ, To the Peninsula) was written about her life on the Shima peninsula.
- Ama-San, an award-winning 2016 documentary film by Portuguese director Cláudia Varejão, follows the daily life of three Japanese Ama women who have been diving together, for 30 years, in a small fishing village on the Shima peninsula.
