= Ise-wan Ferry =

Passenger-car ferry in Japan

Coordinates: 34.543°N 136.953°E

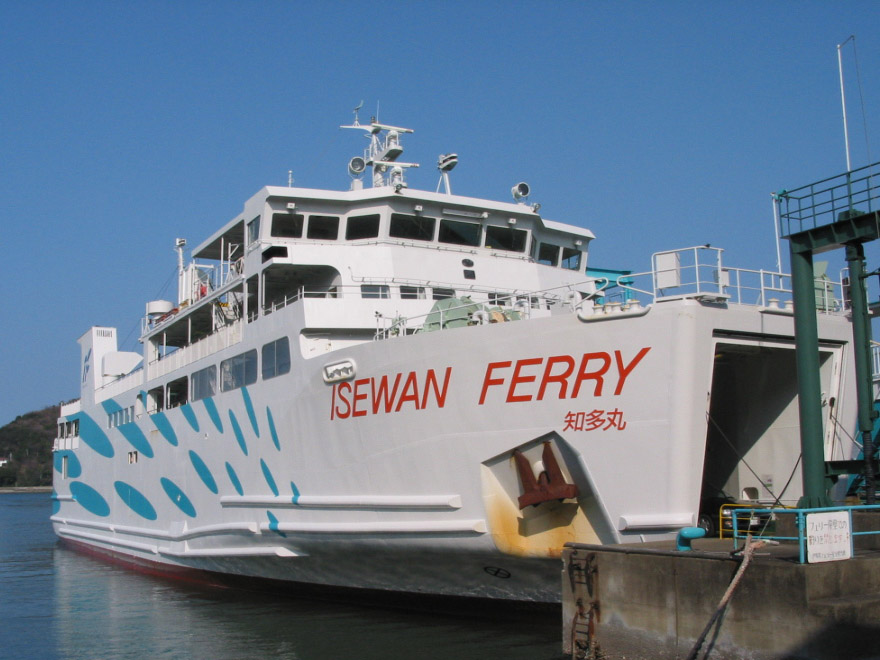
Ise-wan Ferry in the Port of Toba

The Ise-wan Ferry (伊勢湾フェリー), or Ise Bay Ferry is a passenger-car ferry between Toba, Mie Prefecture and Irago, Tahara, Aichi Prefecture, Japan. The ferry route serves as the sea section of National Route 42 and National Route 259.

== Route ==
The ferry service links Toba Port in Toba and Irago Port at Cape Irago in Tahara. A distance of 23.2 kilometres (14.4 mi), crossing the mouth of the eponymous Ise Bay takes around 55 to 60 minutes. The ferry passes a number of islands (including Kamishima, Sakatejima, Sugashima and Tōshijima) and dolphins and finless porpoises are often seen. As of 2022, there were eight round trips per day most of the year, and thirteen at peak times. The Toba-Irago sea route is also known as the Shiosai Kaidō.

== History ==
The service was begun in 1964 by the Isewan Car Shipping Company, a joint venture of Nagoya Railroad and Kintetsu Railway companies. In 1974 the operator's name was changed to the Isewan Ferry Company.

In March 2010, the Isewan Ferry Company announced that, due to worsening business performance and other constraints, the service would terminate in September of that year. In recognition of the importance of the service for tourism and the fishing industry, the two prefectures and two cities came together to develop a programme of support and a revitalization council was formed, with the additional involvement of the Chūbu Regional Transport Bureau, local businesses, and academic advisers.

== Ferries ==
Three vessels ply the route, each with a capacity of five hundred passengers:

- Chita-maru (知多丸)
- Ise-maru (伊勢丸)
- Toba-maru (鳥羽丸)

== See also ==
- Ise-Shima National Park
- Ise Shrine
