= Shirongo Matsuri =

Japanese festival

Coordinates: 34°30′09″N 136°54′23″E

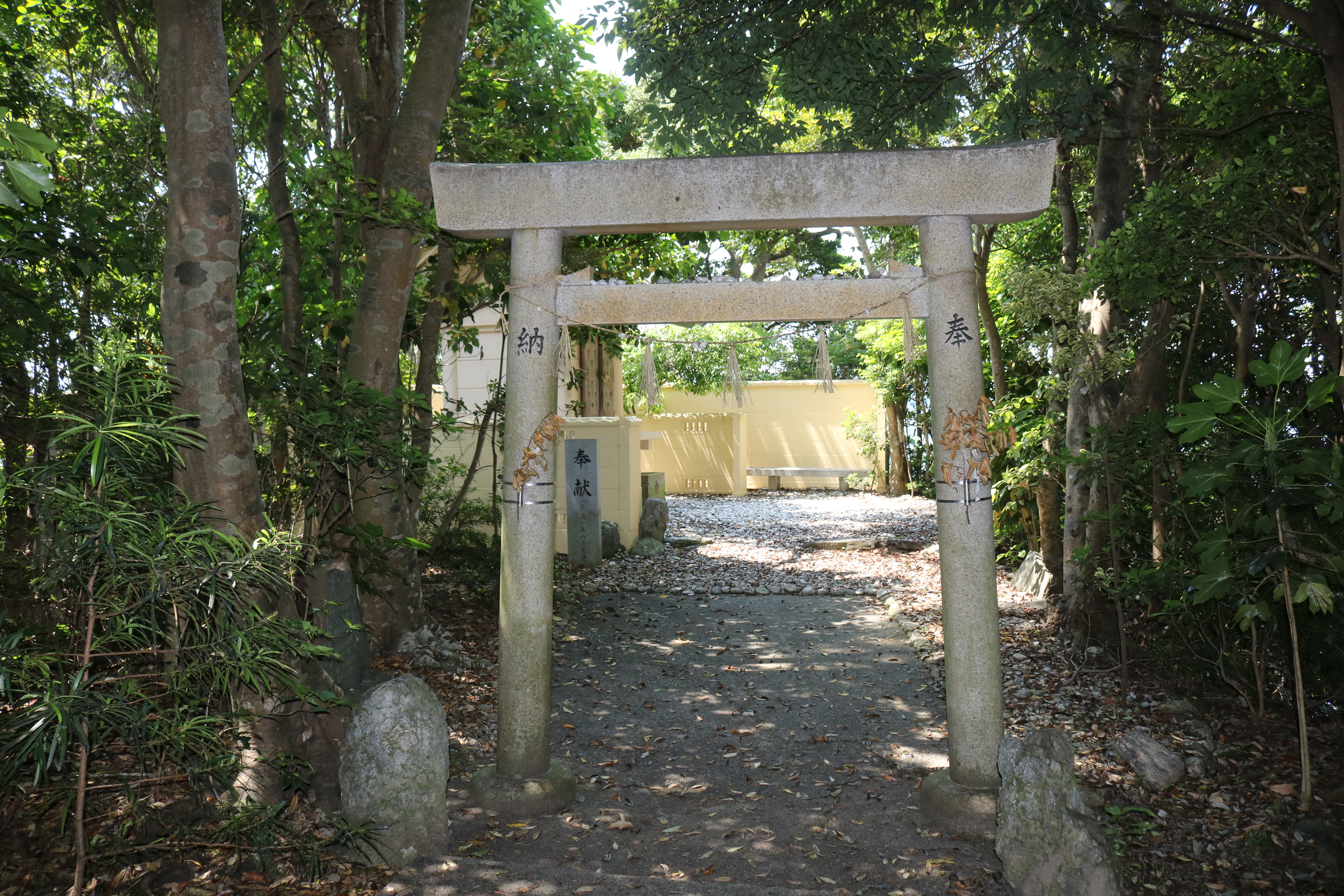
Torii leading to Shirohige Jinja

Shirongo Matsuri (しろんご祭) is a Japanese festival that takes place on the island of Sugashima in Toba, Mie Prefecture, Japan in early July each year. Offered in prayer for a bountiful catch and maritime safety, it has been designated a Municipal Intangible Folk Cultural Property, is a constituent part of Japan Heritage Story #073, Shima & Toba, Towns Where You Can Encounter Ama: Women Who Live Through Skin Diving, and has been selected by the Ministry of Land, Infrastructure, Transport and Tourism for inclusion on its listing of Island Treasures: 100 Views (島の宝100景).

== Description ==
The origins of the festival are said to lie in an episode some seven hundred years ago, when a white snake came ashore on Sugashima, where it was worshipped as a messenger of Ryūjin, guardian deity of the island alongside Shirohige Myōjin (白鬚明神). The festival, once held on the eleventh day of the sixth month of the old lunisolar calendar, now takes place on the eleventh of July each year, or on the Saturday closest to this date. Early in the morning, in the waters to the northeast of the island off Shirongo Beach (白浜 also しろんご浜), which is usually closed to fishing, Sugashima's fishing boats, decked out with large fishing flags, gather in worship of Shirohige Myōjin. At around 8 a.m., after purification by a Shinto priest and a beach dance, and upon the sounding of a conch, the ama diving-girls, clad in white isogi (磯着), all enter the water and compete to catch a pair of black and red abalone. The first to return with paired abalone, one male one female, places them on a board from a boat and dedicates them to Shirohige Myōjin at Shirohige Jinja, the kami's tutelary shrine. These offerings are termed "beckoning abalone" (まねきあわび, maneki-awabi) and are said to invite other abalone and promise a good catch, while the ama in question becomes the head ama for the year. The beach, shrine, and surrounding waters where the festival takes place are all situated and protected within Ise-Shima National Park.

== See also ==
- Festivals in Mie Prefecture
- Toba Sea-Folk Museum
- Ise Jingū, Meoto Iwa
- Toba Castle
- Haenyeo
- Maneki-neko
