= Kintetsu 23000 series =

Japanese train type

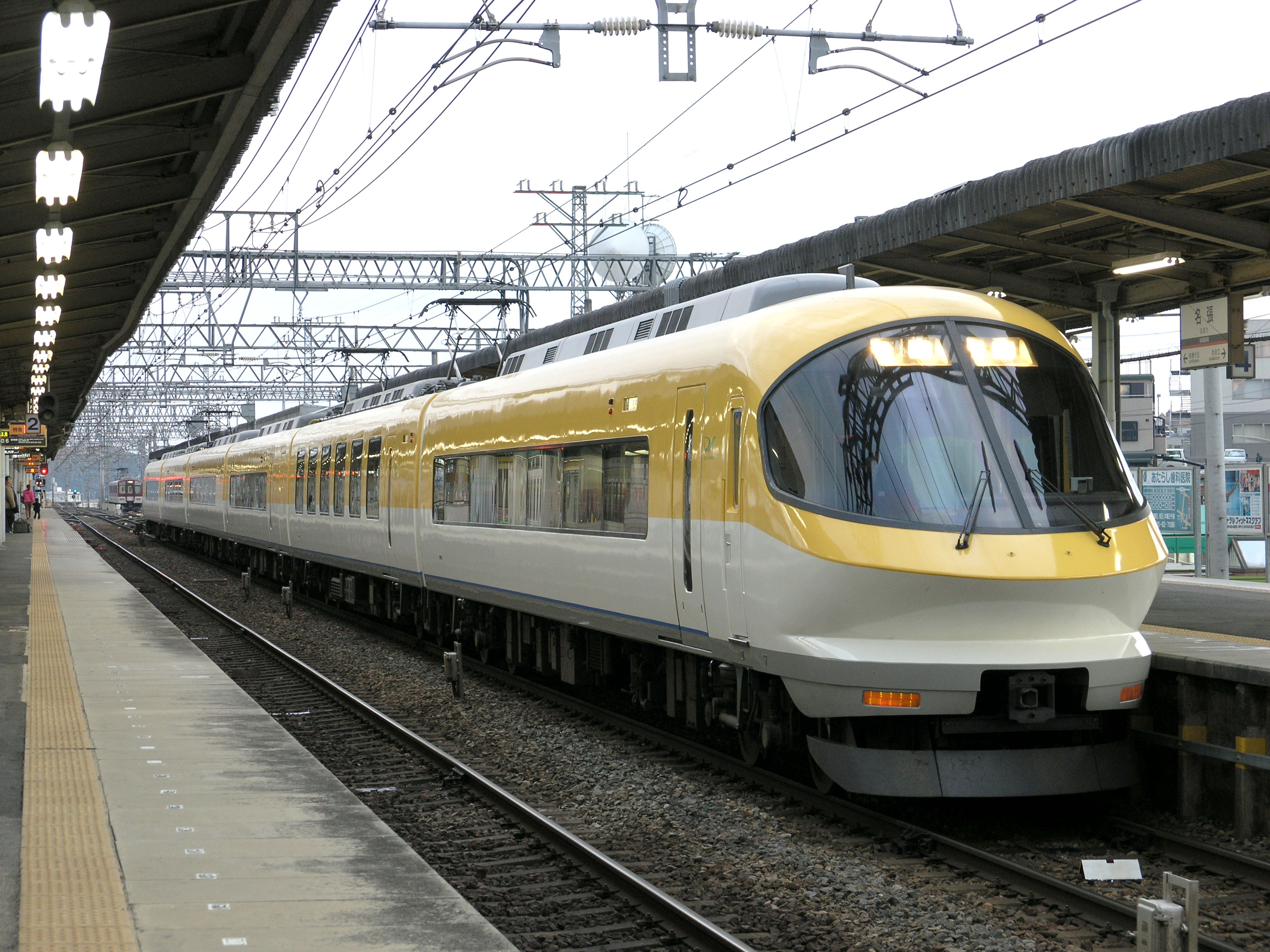
- Kintetsu 23000 series, November 2008
- In service: 1994–present
- Manufacturer: Kinki Sharyo
- Family name: Ise-Shima Liner
- Constructed: 1994–1995
- Entered service: 15 March 1994
- Refurbished: 2012–2013
- Number built: 36 vehicles (6 sets)
- Number in service: 36 vehicles (6 sets)
- Formation: 6 cars per trainset
- Fleet numbers: iL01 – iL06
- Operators: Kintetsu
- Depots: Saidaiji, Takayasu
- Lines served: Kintetsu Namba Line; Kintetsu Nara Line; Kintetsu Kyoto Line; Kintetsu Kashihara Line; Kintetsu Osaka Line; Kintetsu Nagoya Line; Kintetsu Yamada Line; Kintetsu Toba Line; Kintetsu Shima Line

Specifications
- Car body construction: Steel
- Train length: 124.4 m (408 ft)
- Car length: 20,820 mm (68 ft 4 in) (end cars); 20,520 mm (67 ft 4 in) (intermediate cars)
- Width: 2,800 mm (9 ft 2 in)
- Doors: Plug doors (1 per side)
- Maximum speed: 130 km/h (81 mph)
- Weight: 244 t (240 long tons; 269 short tons)
- Traction system: Variable frequency (GTO, SiC MOSFET)
- Power output: 3,200 kW
- Acceleration: 2.5 km/(h⋅s) (1.6 mph/s)
- Deceleration: 4.0 km/(h⋅s) (2.5 mph/s)
- Electric system(s): 1,500 V DC overhead line
- Current collector(s): Scissors-type pantographs
- Bogies: Bolsterless; KD-307A (trailer); KD-307 (motored)
- Braking system(s): Electronically controlled pneumatic brakes
- Safety system(s): Kintetsu ATS (old/new)
- Track gauge: 1,435 mm (4 ft 8 1/2 in)

The Kintetsu 23000 series (近鉄23000系) is an electric multiple unit (EMU) train type operated in Japan by Kintetsu Railway since 1994.

== Formations ==
The fleet of six 6-car sets are formed as follows, with four motored (M) intermediate cars and two trailer ends cars.

Car No.	6	5	4	3	2	1
Designation	Tc	M	M	M	M	Tc
Numbering	23100	23200	23300	23400	23500	23600
Weight (t)	36.2	42.2	41.2	41.2	42.2	36.2
Seating capacity	39	36	48	48	50	52

Cars 2 and 5 are each fitted with two scissors-type pantographs.

== Interior ==
Cars 1 to 4 have regular 2+2 abreast unidirectional seating. Car 5 is designated a "Salon Car", and has fixed facing seating bays with tables arranged 2+1 abreast. Car 6 is designated a "Deluxe Car", and has 2+1 abreast unidirectional seating.

== History ==
=== Refurbishment ===
All six trainsets underwent a refurbishment programme, with new interiors and external repainting in red or yellow liveries. The first refurbished set returned to service from 4 August 2012, with the last set completed by July 2013.

Set No.	Colour	Date refurbished
23101	Red	June 2013
23102	Yellow	December 2012
23103	Red	4 August 2012
23104	Yellow	September 2012
23105	Red	July 2013
23106	Yellow	February 2013

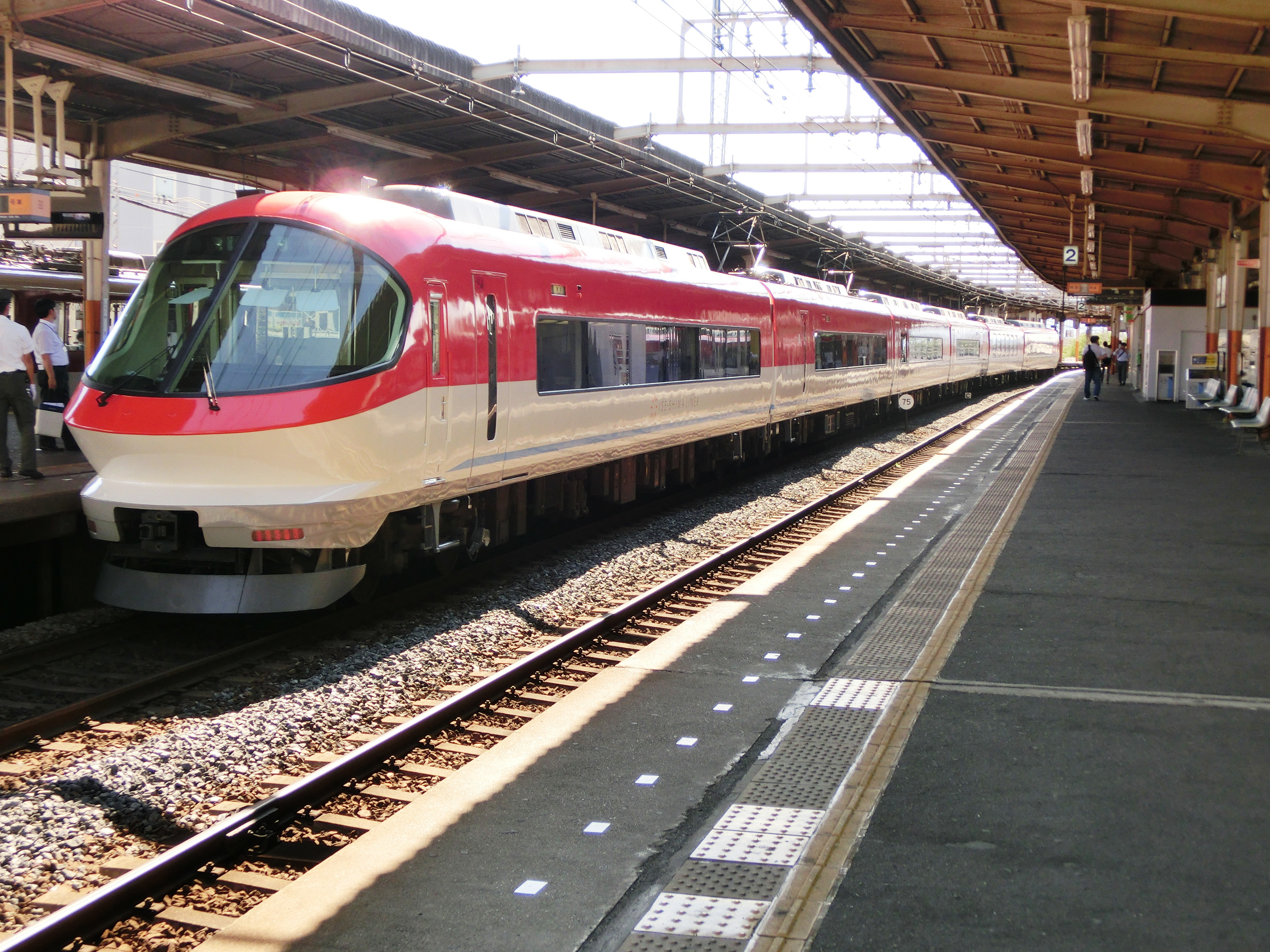
Refurbished set in red livery, August 2012

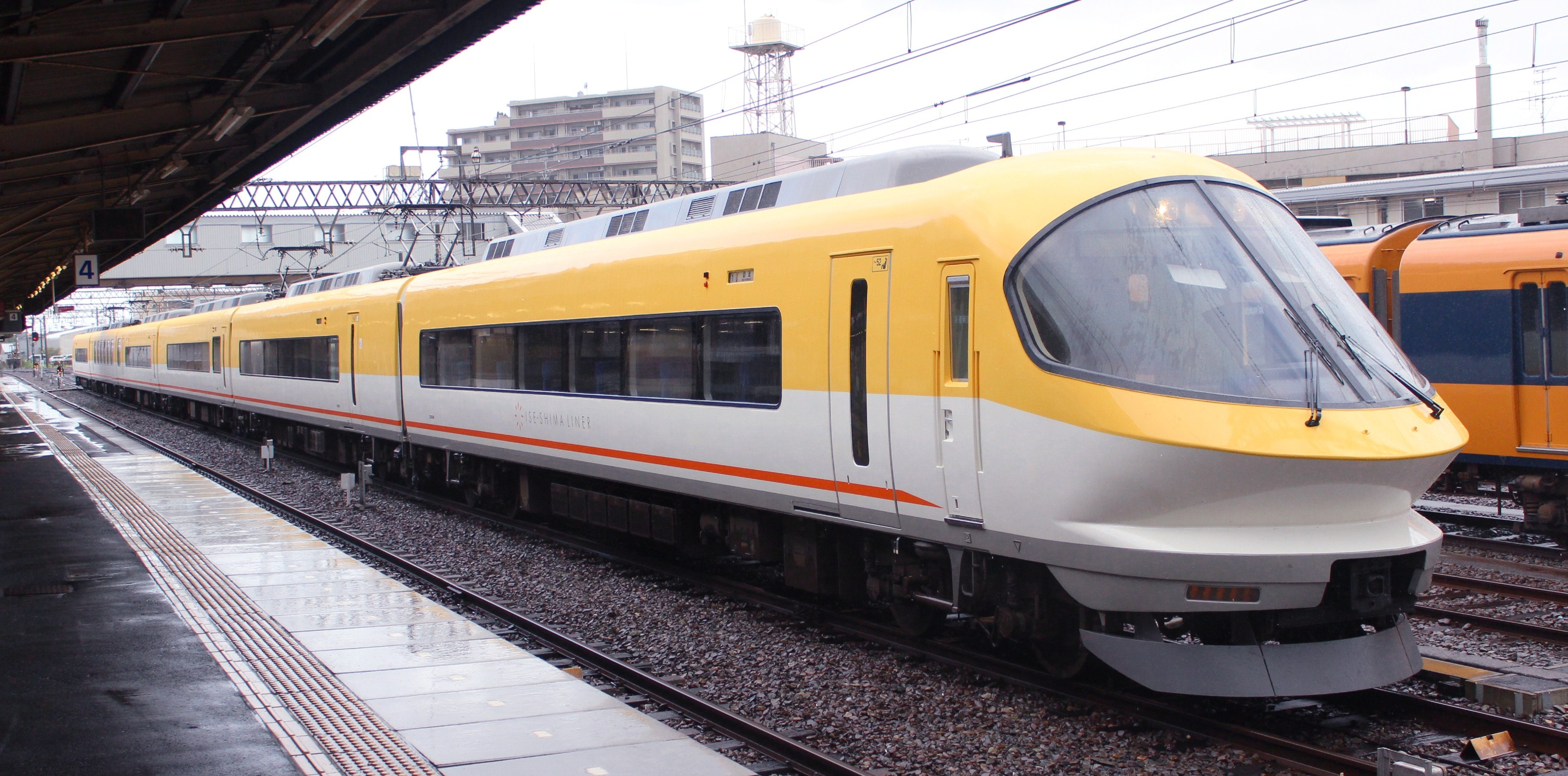
Refurbished set in yellow livery, September 2012
