= Sugashima Lighthouse =

Sugashima Lighthouse Suga Sima 菅島灯台
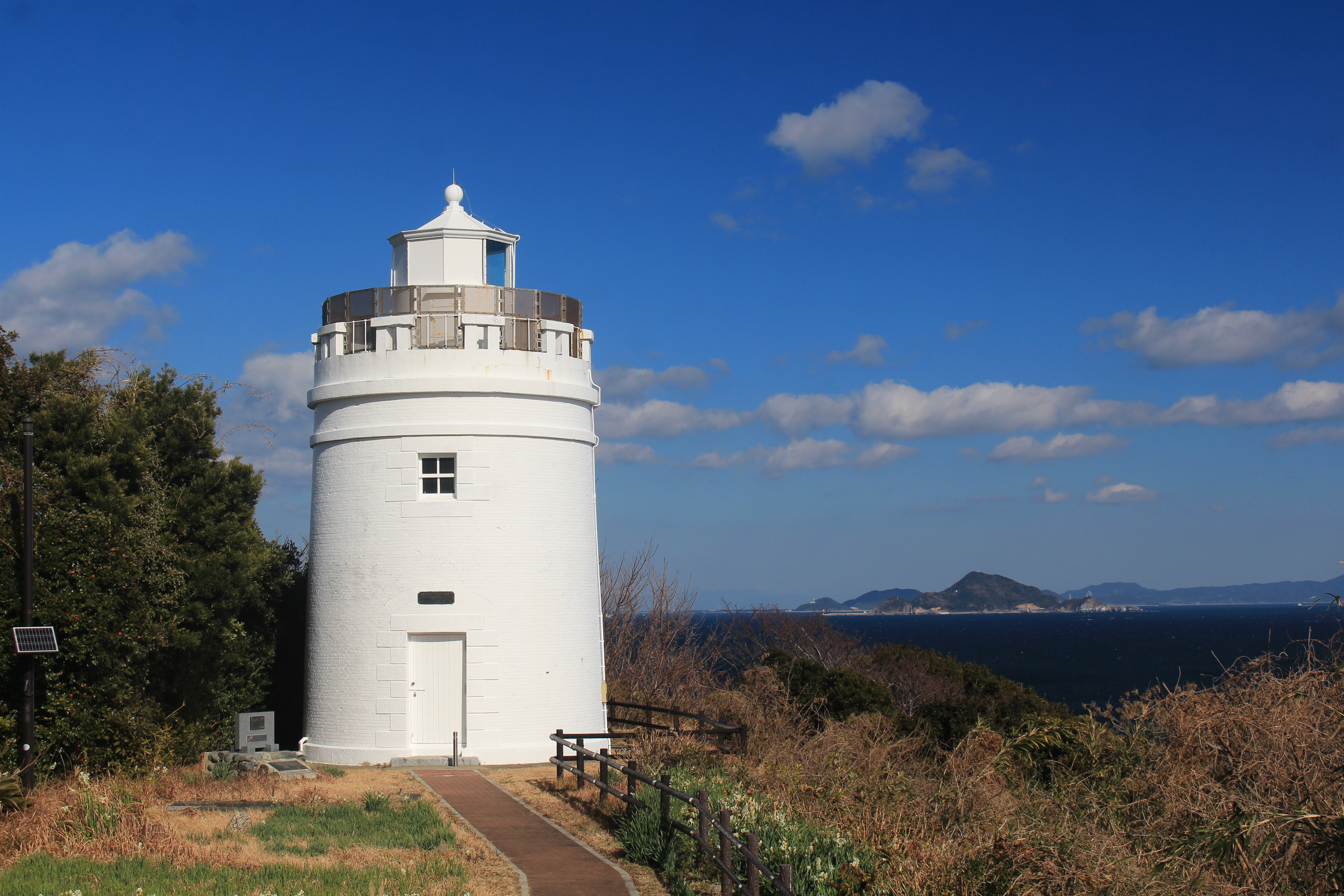
- Sugashima Lighthouse and Kami Island
- Location: Sugashima, off Toba; Mie Prefecture; Japan
- Coordinates: 34°29′59.9″N 136°54′31.8″E

Tower
- Constructed: July 1, 1873
- Foundation: concrete base
- Construction: masonry tower
- Automated: July 1959
- Height: 9.7 metres (32 ft)
- Shape: cylindrical tower with balcony and lantern
- Markings: white tower and lantern
- Heritage: Registered Tangible Cultural Property of Japan

Light
- First lit: 1 July 1873
- Focal height: 54.5 metres (179 ft)
- Lens: Fourth Order Fresnel
- Range: 27 kilometres (15 nmi)
- Characteristic: Fl W 4s.
- Japan no.: JCG-2750

Sugashima Lighthouse (菅島灯台, Sugashima tōdai) is a lighthouse located on the island of Sugashima, in Ise Bay off the shores of the city of Toba, Mie Prefecture, Japan. It is located within the borders of the Ise-Shima National Park.

== History ==
The Sugashima Lighthouse was designed and constructed by British engineer Richard Henry Brunton. Work began in February 1872. It was first lit on July 1, 1873, in a ceremony attended by Saigō Takamori and other dignitaries of the Meiji government. Brunton constructed a total of 25 lighthouses in Japan from far northern Hokkaidō to southern Kyūshū during his career in Japan, each with a different design. Built of domestically produced white bricks, the Sugashima Lighthouse is styled in the manner of a European castle round tower, complete with crenellations. It replaced a more primitive light established by the Tokugawa shogunate on the island in 1673 in response to numerous shipwrecks in the area.

The lighthouse was fully automated and has been unattended since July 1959. The 9.7-meter-tall (32 ft) tower contains a fourth order Fresnel lens, and has a range of 27 kilometers.

The Sugashima Lighthouse is listed as one of the “50 Lighthouses of Japan” by the Japan Lighthouse Association. It is operated by the Japan Coast Guard.

== Protected status ==
In 1964, the former official abode of the lighthouse keeper was relocated to serve as an exhibit at Meiji Mura, a historical museum in Inuyama, Aichi and was registered as an Important Cultural Property of Japan in 1968. The lighthouse itself became a Registered Tangible Cultural Property of Japan in 2010.

== See also ==
- List of lighthouses in Japan
