= Sakate =

Sakate (written: 坂手 or 阪手) is a Japanese surname. Notable people with the surname include:

- Atsushi Sakate (坂手 淳史, born 1993), Japanese rugby union player
- Yōji Sakate (坂手 洋二, born 1962), Japanese playwright

== See also ==
- Sakatejima, an island of Mie Prefecture, Japan
