= Ōzukumi-jima =

Island in Japan

Native name: Ōzukumi-jima (大築海島)
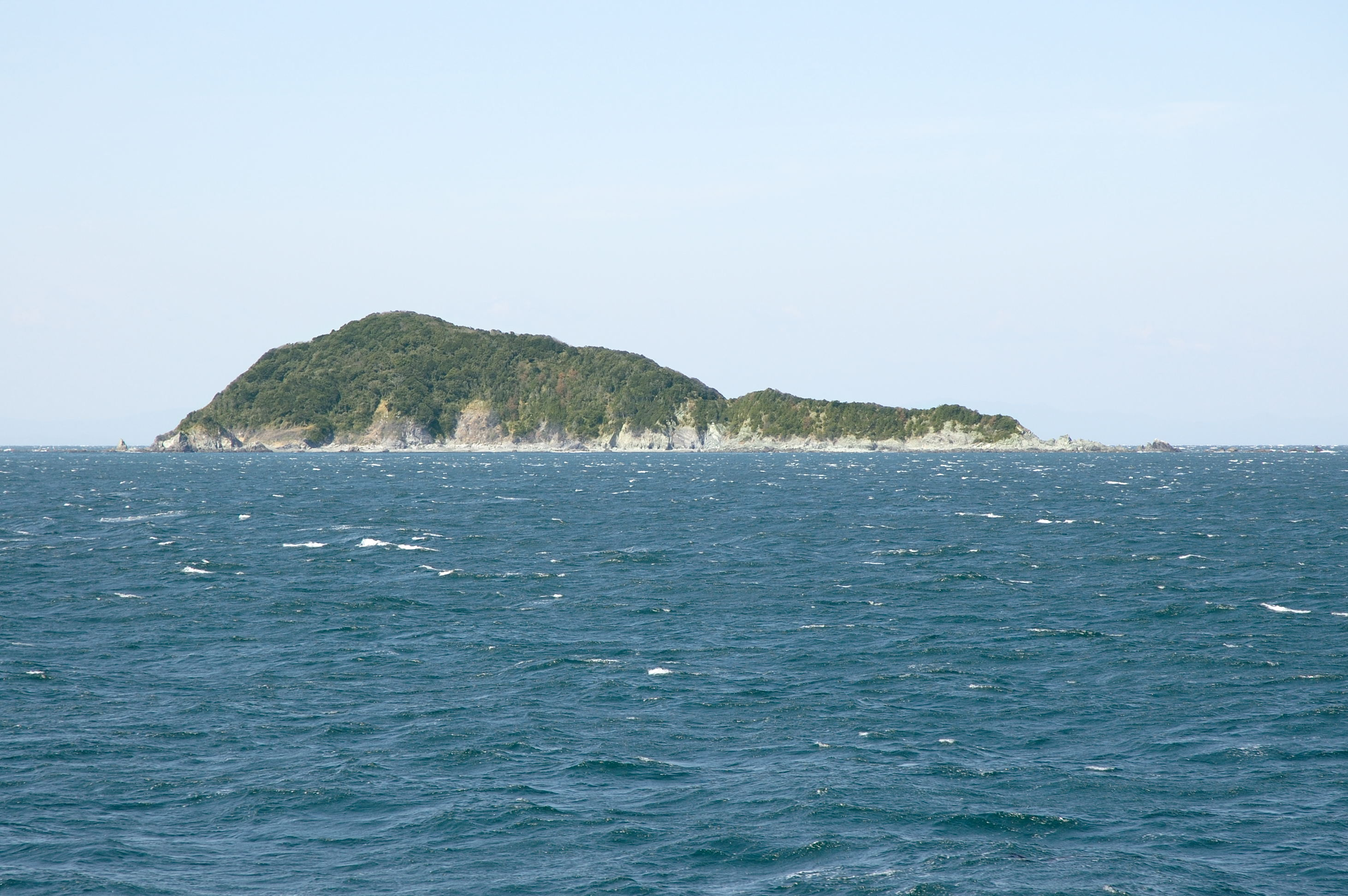
- Ōzukumi-jima
- Interactive map of Ōzukumi-jima

Geography
- Location: Mie Prefecture
- Coordinates: 34°32′30″N 136°54′40″E
- Area: 0.636 km^{2} (0.246 sq mi)

Administration
- Japan

Demographics
- Population: uninhabited

Ōzukumi-jima (大築海島) is an island located in Ise Bay off the east coast of central Honshu, Japan. It is administered as part of the city of Toba in Mie Prefecture.

Ōzukumi-jima is mentioned in the Heian period Wamyō Ruijushō . Archaeologists have found shell middens and the remains mid-Yayoi period pit houses and ceramics on the islands, indicating that it was inhabited in antiquity. However, the island is not known to have been inhabited in historic times. Some of the shells found in the middens were deep water varieties, suggesting that early people dove for them in the same way ama divers do today.

The waters surrounding Ōzukumi-jima are noted for the commercial fishing of shrimp and octopus. Local fishermen hold a Shinto ceremony on the island annually in July.

The island is not accessible by public transport.

== See also ==
- Desert island
- List of islands
