= Iseshima Skyline =

Toll road in Mie Prefecture, Japan

Coordinates: 34.459524°N 136.805446°E

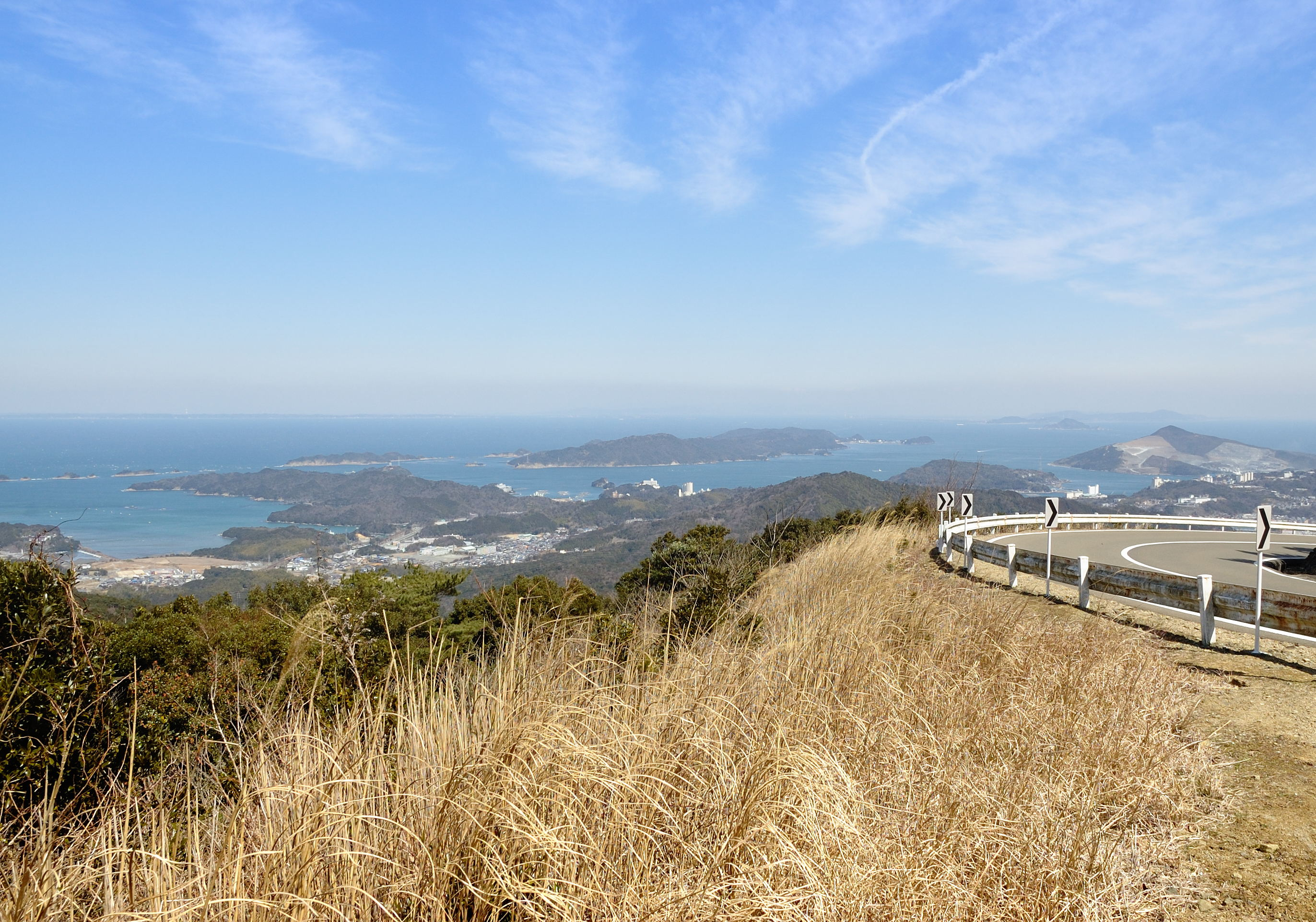
View from Iseshima Skyline on the Pacific Ocean.

Iseshima Skyline (伊勢志摩スカイライン, Iseshimasukairain) is a sight seeing toll road going through the Asamayama mountain, in Mie Prefecture, Japan.

The road is 16.5 km long and 6.5 m wide. The tolls are collected at the Iseshi-ujitachichou and Tobashi-Tobachou locations. As of August 2006, the toll for 2 wheeled vehicles was ¥860 and for cars ¥1220.
