= Asama Station =

Railway station in Ise, Mie Prefecture, Japan

Asama Station 朝熊駅
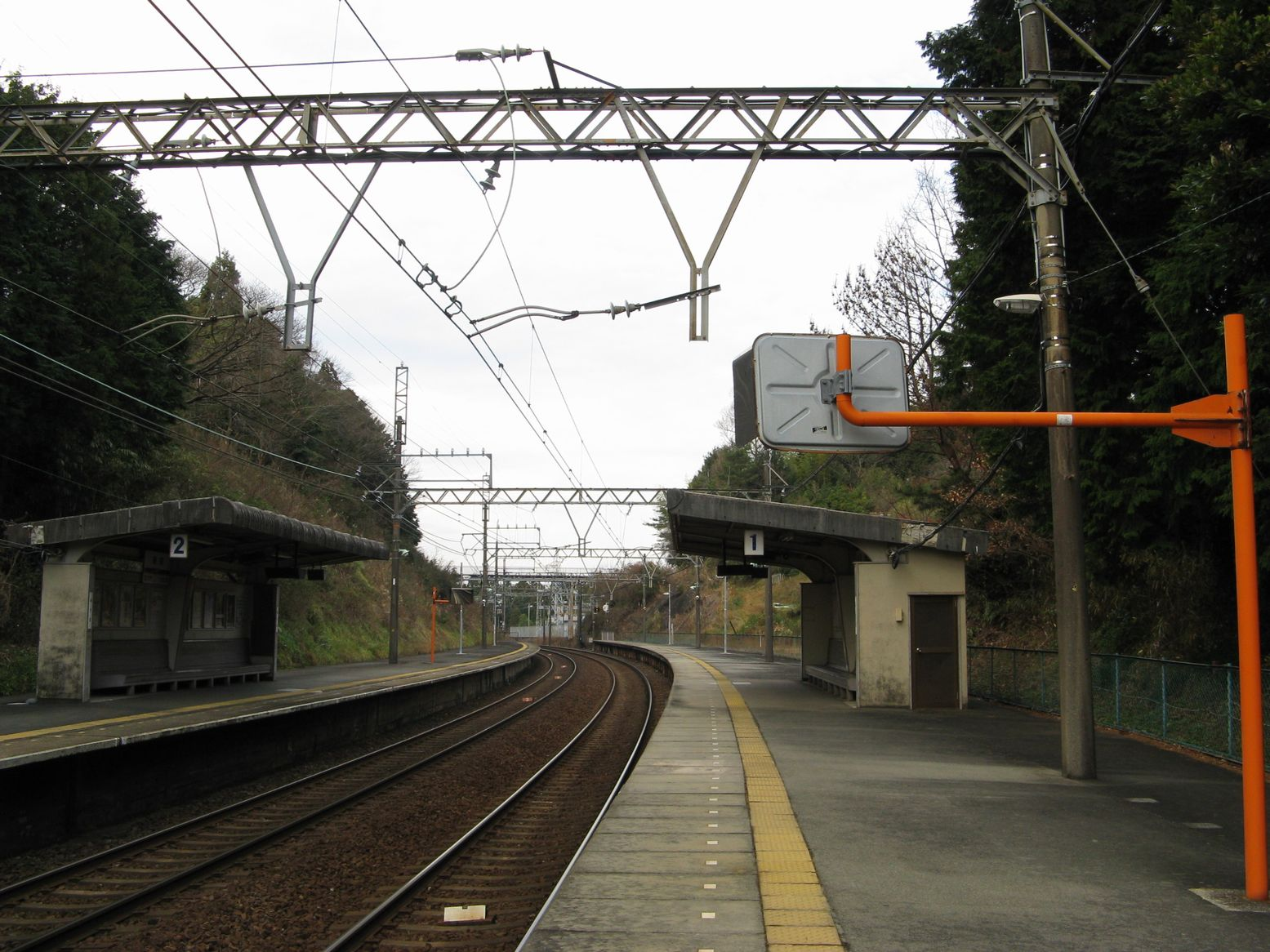
- Asama Station platforms, January 2009

General information
- Location: 1486 Koboyama, Asama-cho, Ise-shi, Mie-ken 516-0021; Japan
- Coordinates: 34.4770°N 136.7572°E
- Operator: Kintetsu Railway
- Line: Toba Line
- Distance: 33.2 km (20.6 mi) from Ise-Nakagawa
- Platforms: 2 side platforms
- Connections: Bus terminal

Other information
- Station code: M76
- Website: Official website

History
- Opened: March 1, 1970

Passengers
- FY2019: 117 daily
Location
- Location within Mie Prefecture Location within Japan

Asama Station (朝熊駅, Asama-eki) is a passenger railway station located in the city of Ise, Mie Prefecture, Japan, run by the private railway operator Kintetsu Railway.

== Lines ==
Asama Station is served by the Toba Line, and is located 4.9 rail kilometers from the starting point of the line at Ujiyamada Station.

== Station layout ==
The station was consists of two opposed side platforms built on an embankment. The station has no station building and the station is unattended.

=== Platforms ===
1	■ Toba Line	for Toba and Kashikojima
2	■ Toba Line	for Ujiyamada, Nagoya, Osaka Namba and Kyoto

== Adjacent stations ==
«	Service	»
Toba Line
Isuzugawa	Rapid Express	Ikenoura
Isuzugawa	Express	Ikenoura
Isuzugawa	Local	Ikenoura

== History ==
Asama Station opened on March 1, 1970.

== Passenger statistics ==
In fiscal 2019, the station was used by an average of 117 passengers daily (boarding passengers only).

== Surrounding area ==
- Mount Asama hiking trail

== See also ==
- List of railway stations in Japan
