= Kozukumi Island =

Island in Toba, Japan

Kozukumi-jima
Native name: Kozukumi-jima (小築海島)
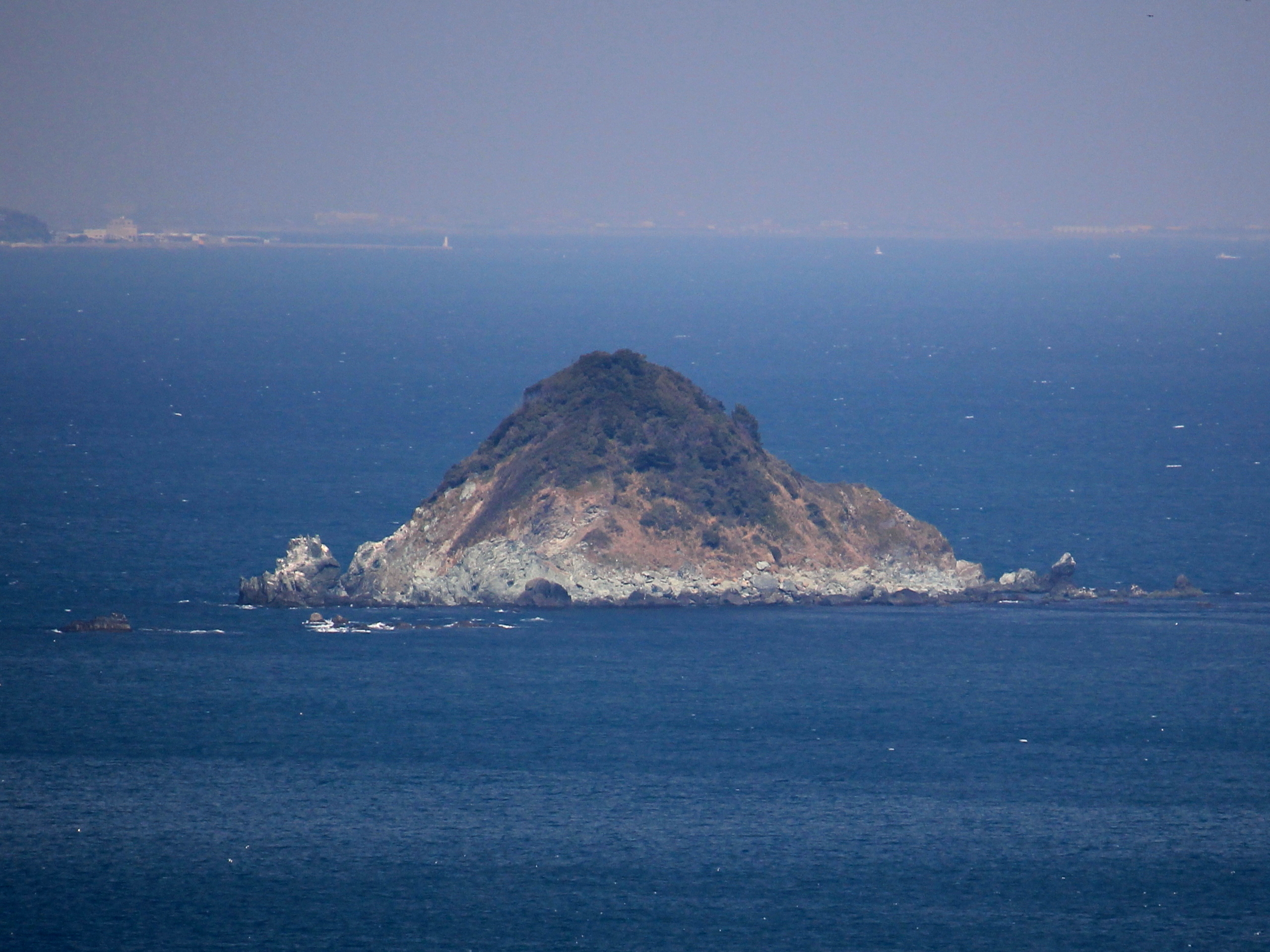
- Kozukumi-jima
- Interactive map of Kozukumi-jima

Geography
- Location: Mie Prefecture
- Coordinates: 34°32′56″N 136°55′29″E
- Area: 0.312 km^{2} (0.120 sq mi)
- Highest elevation: 41 m (135 ft)

Administration
- Japan

Demographics
- Population: uninhabited

Kozukumi-jima (小築海島) is an island located in Ise Bay off the east coast of central Honshu, Japan. It is administered as part of the city of Toba in Mie Prefecture.

Kozukumi-jima is uninhabited. It has been regarded as a sacred island to the Shinto religion since ancient times, and commercial fishing in its adjacent waters is prohibited. Archaeologists have found the remains of stone sanctuaries, which has been designated as a Hachiman Shrine by local fishermen, who hold a ceremony on the island annually on July 11. Other than this occasion, landing on the island is forbidden.

== See also ==
- Desert island
- List of islands
