= Isuzugawa Station =

Railway station in Ise, Mie Prefecture, Japan

Isuzugawa Station 五十鈴川駅
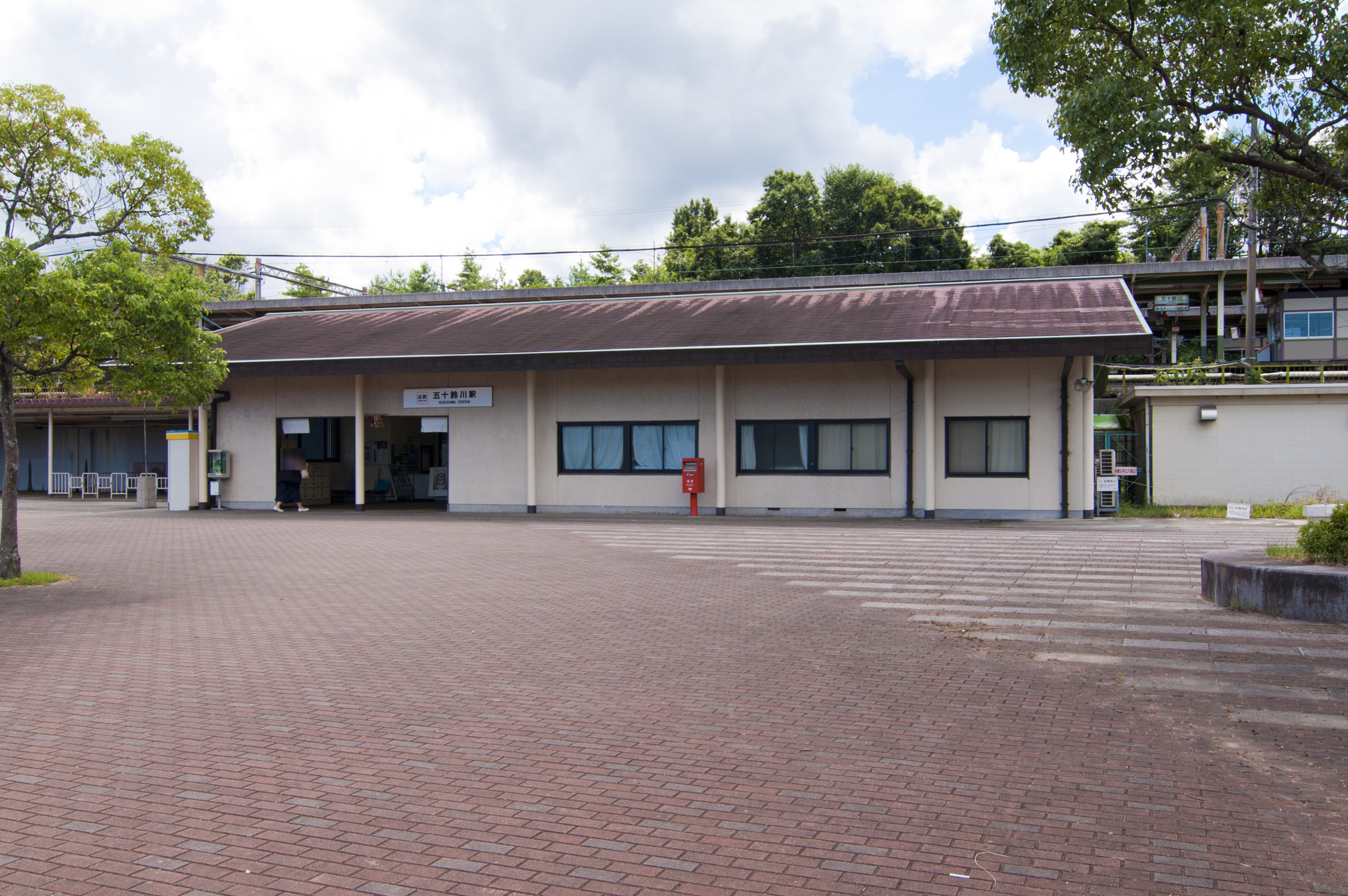
- Station building (August 2010)

General information
- Location: Nakamura-cho 325, Ise-shi, Mie-ken 516-0014; Japan
- Coordinates: 34.4764°N 136.7276°E
- Operator: Kintetsu Railway
- Line: Toba Line
- Distance: 30.2 km from Ise-Nakagawa
- Platforms: 2 island platforms
- Tracks: 4
- Connections: Bus terminal

Construction
- Structure type: Embankment
- Accessible: Yes

Other information
- Station code: M75
- Website: Official website

History
- Opened: 15 December 1969

Passengers
- FY2019: 2026 daily
Location
- Location within Mie Prefecture Location within Japan

Isuzugawa Station (五十鈴川駅, Isuzugawa-eki) is a passenger railway station in located in the city of Ise, Mie Prefecture, Japan, operated by the private railway operator Kintetsu Railway.

== Lines ==
Isuzugawa Station is served by the Toba Line, and is located 1.9 rail kilometers from the starting point of the line at Ujiyamada Station.

== Station layout ==
The station was consists of two island platforms serving four tracks. The inner tracks (platforms 2 and 3) are for normal operations. The platforms are built on an embankment and connected to the station building by an underground passage.

=== Platforms ===
1, 2	■ Toba Line	For Toba, Kashikojima
3, 4	■ Toba Line	For Ujiyamada, Nagoya, Osaka Namba, Kobe and Kyoto

== Adjacent stations ==
«	Service	»
Toba Line
Ujiyamada	Local	Asama
Ujiyamada	Express	Asama
Ujiyamada	Rapid Express	Asama
Ujiyamada	Limited Express	Toba
Non-stop Limited Express: Does not stop at this station
Limited Express "Shimakaze": Does not stop at this station

== History ==
Isuzugawa Station was opened on December 15, 1969. The station has used PiTaPa automated wicket gates since April 1, 2007.

== Passenger statistics ==
In fiscal 2019, the station was used by an average of 2026 passengers daily (boarding passengers only).

== Surrounding area ==
- Ise Grand Shrine
- Ise General Hospital
- Jusco
- Kōgakkan University
- Kōgakkan High School
- Ise High School

== See also ==
- List of railway stations in Japan
