= Ikenoura Station =

Railway station in Toba, Mie Prefecture, Japan

Ikenoura Station 池の浦駅
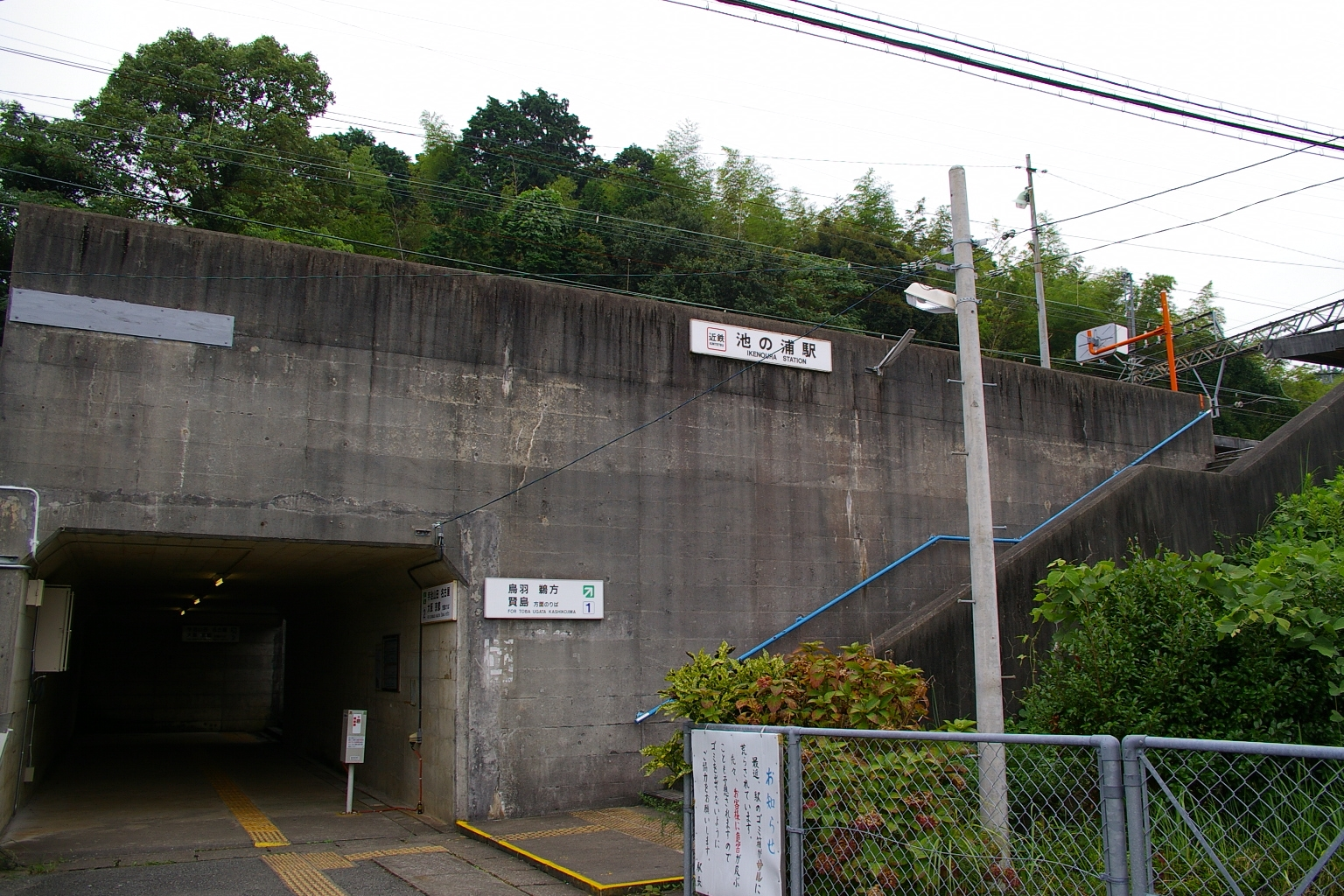
- Ikenoura Station

General information
- Location: Katakami-cho, Toba-shi, Mie-ken 517-0014; Japan
- Coordinates: 34.4791°N 136.8186°E
- Operator: Kintetsu Railway
- Line: Toba Line
- Distance: 38.9 km from Ise-Nakagawa
- Platforms: 2 side platforms
- Connections: Bus terminal

Other information
- Station code: M77
- Website: Official website

History
- Opened: July 23, 1929

Passengers
- FY2019: 473 daily
Location
- Location within Mie Prefecture Location within Japan

Ikenoura Station (池の浦駅, Ikenoura-eki) is a passenger railway station in located in the city of Toba, Mie Prefecture, Japan, operated by the private railway operator Kintetsu Railway.

== Lines ==
Ikenoura Station is served by the Toba Line, and is located 38.9 rail kilometers from the terminus of the line at Ise-Nakagawa Station.

== Station layout ==
The station consists of two opposed side platforms built on an embankment. There is no station building, and the station is unattended.

=== Platforms ===
1	■ Toba Line	For Toba and Kashikojima
2	■ Toba Line	For Ujiyamada, Nagoya, Osaka Namba and Kyoto

== Adjacent stations ==
«	Service	»
Toba Line
Asama	Rapid Express	Toba
Asama	Express	Toba
Asama	Local	Toba

== History ==
Ikenoura Station opened on March 1, 1970. The station is unattended, and has used PiTaPa automated wicket gates since April 1, 2007.

== Passenger statistics ==
In fiscal 2019, the station was used by an average of 473 passengers daily (boarding passengers only).

== Surrounding area ==
- Toba National College of Maritime Technology
- Japan National Route 42

== See also ==
- List of railway stations in Japan
