= Tōshijima =

Island off the east coast of central Honshu, Japan

Native name: (答志島)
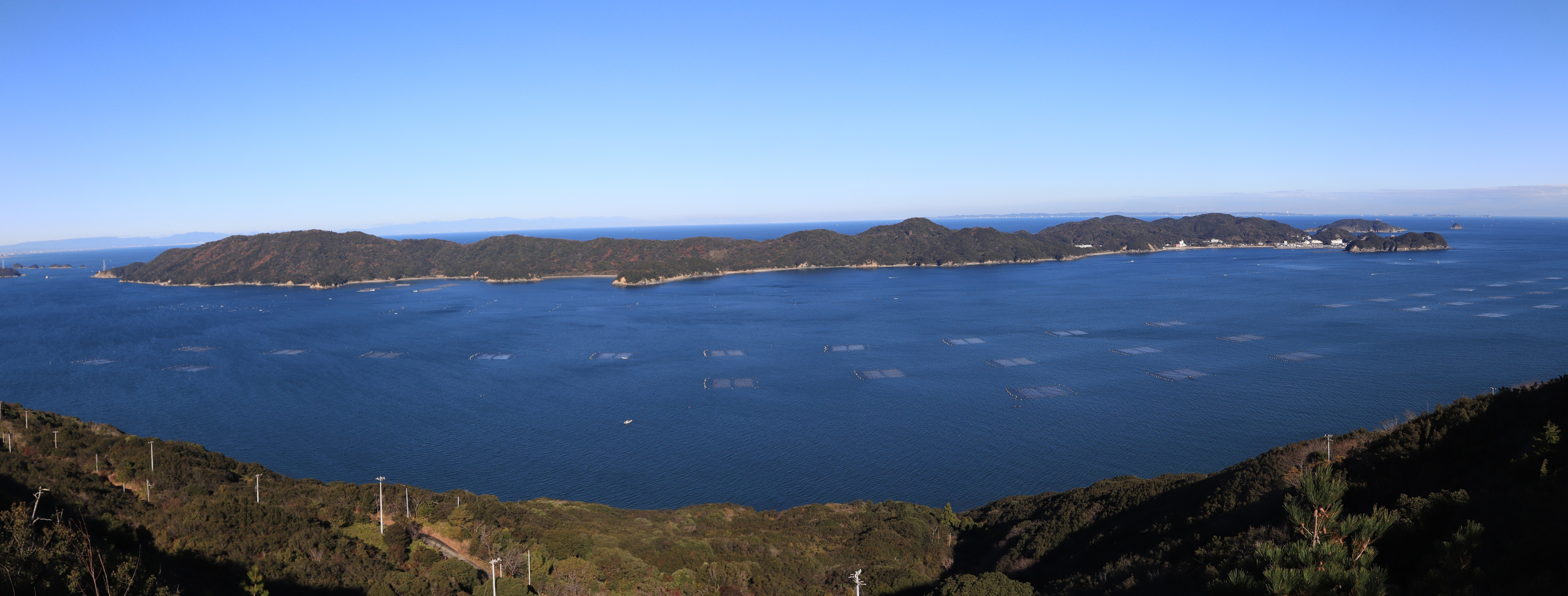
- Tōshijima from Sugashima
- Interactive map of Tōshijima

Geography
- Location: Mie Prefecture
- Coordinates: 34°31′13″N 136°52′39.4″E
- Area: 6.98 km^{2} (2.69 sq mi)
- Coastline: 26,300 m (86300 ft)
- Highest elevation: 167.2 m (548.6 ft)

Administration
- Japan

Demographics
- Population: 2,981 (2000)
- Ethnic groups: Japanese

Tōshijima (答志島) is an inhabited island located in Ise Bay off the east coast of central Honshu, Japan. It is administered as part of the city of Toba in Mie Prefecture. It is the largest of the outlying islands of Toba.

The name of Tōshijima appears in early documents, such as the Man'yōshū and Wamyō Ruijushō, and was a base for pirates led by Kuki Yoshitaka in the Sengoku period.

During the Meiji period, the island was made part of Tōshi District (答志郡), which became part of Shima District from 1896. On November 1, 1954, the island became part of the city of Toba. The economy of the island is based on commercial fishing, aquaculture and tourism.

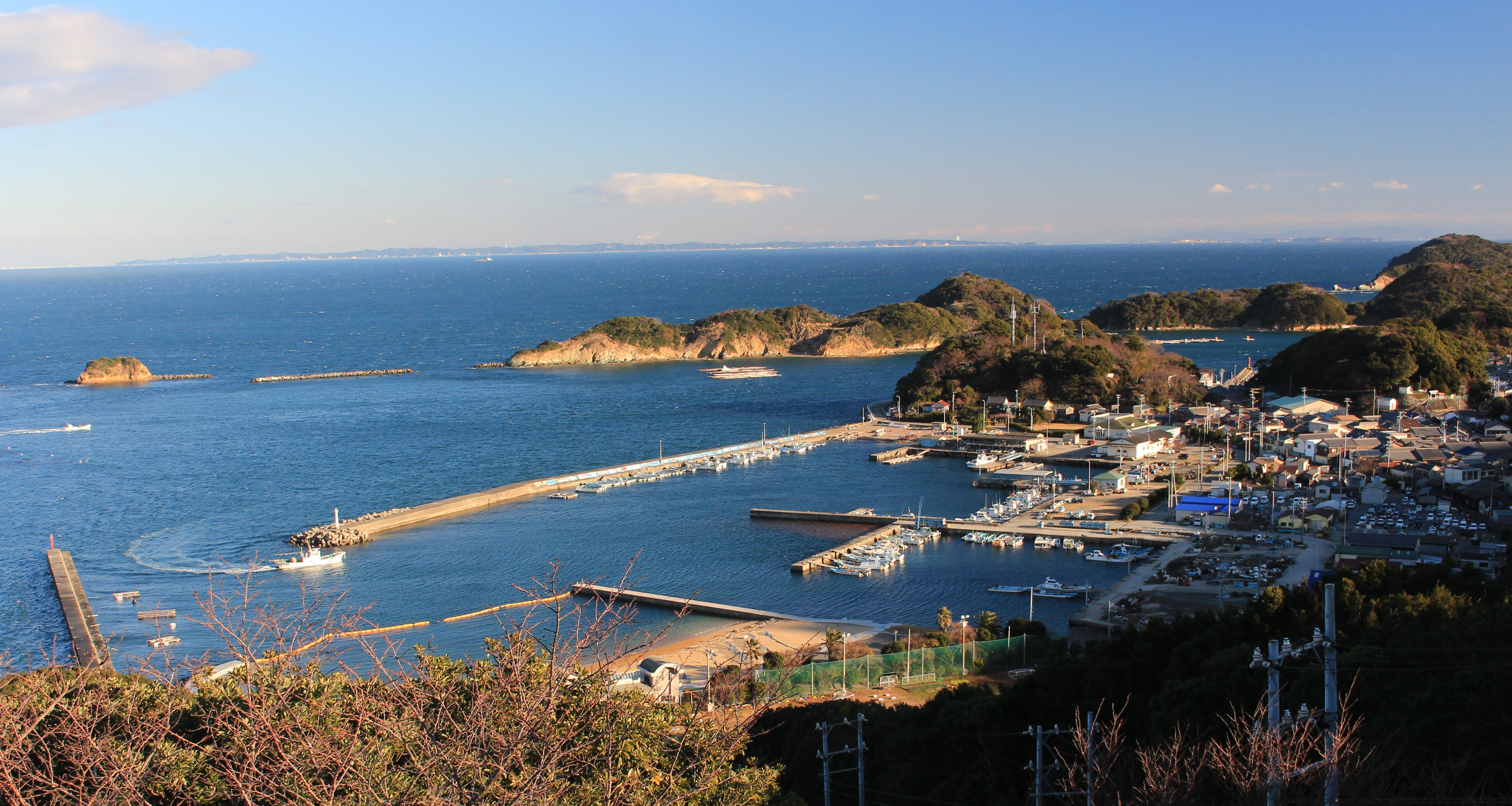
Port of Momotori

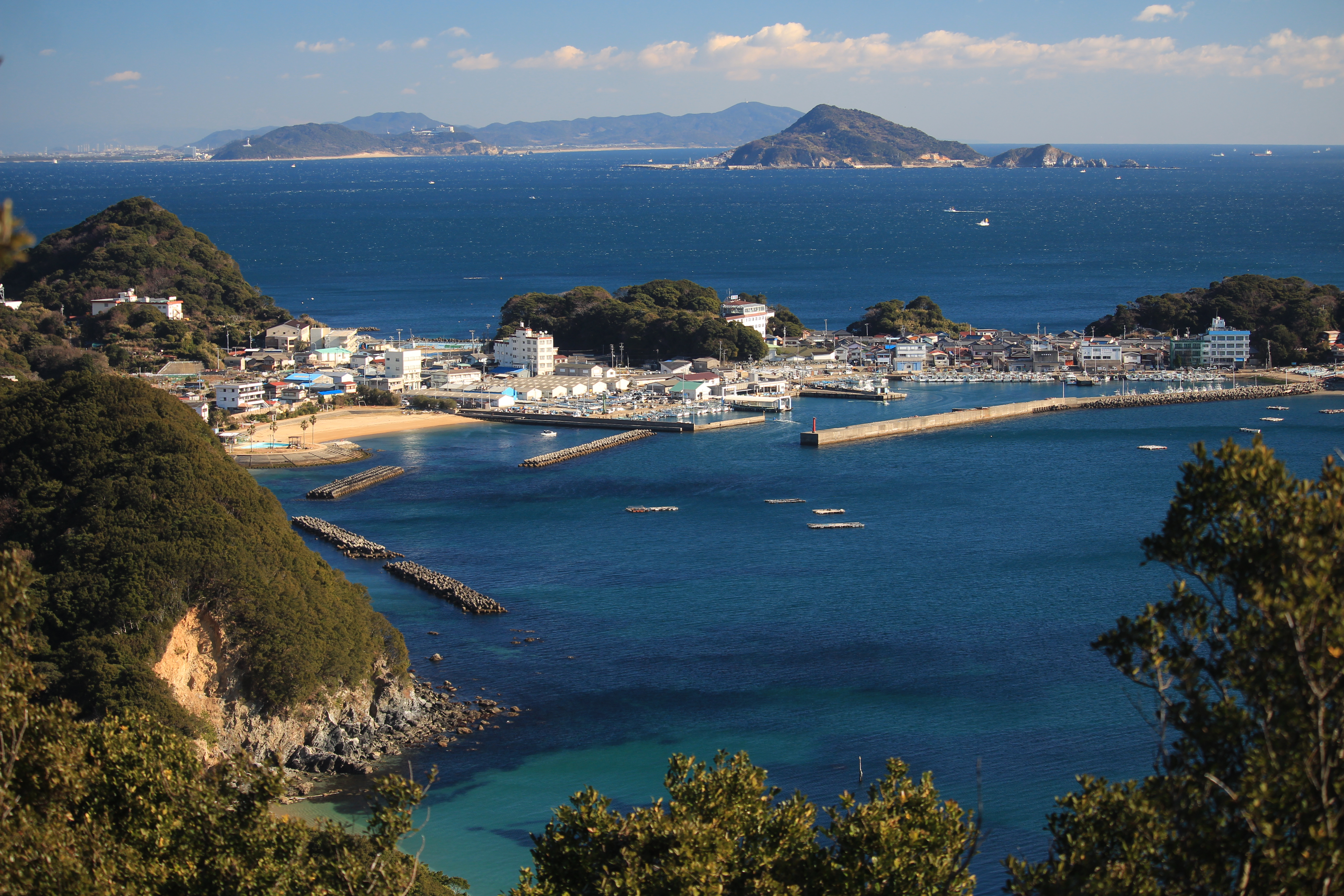
Port of Wagu

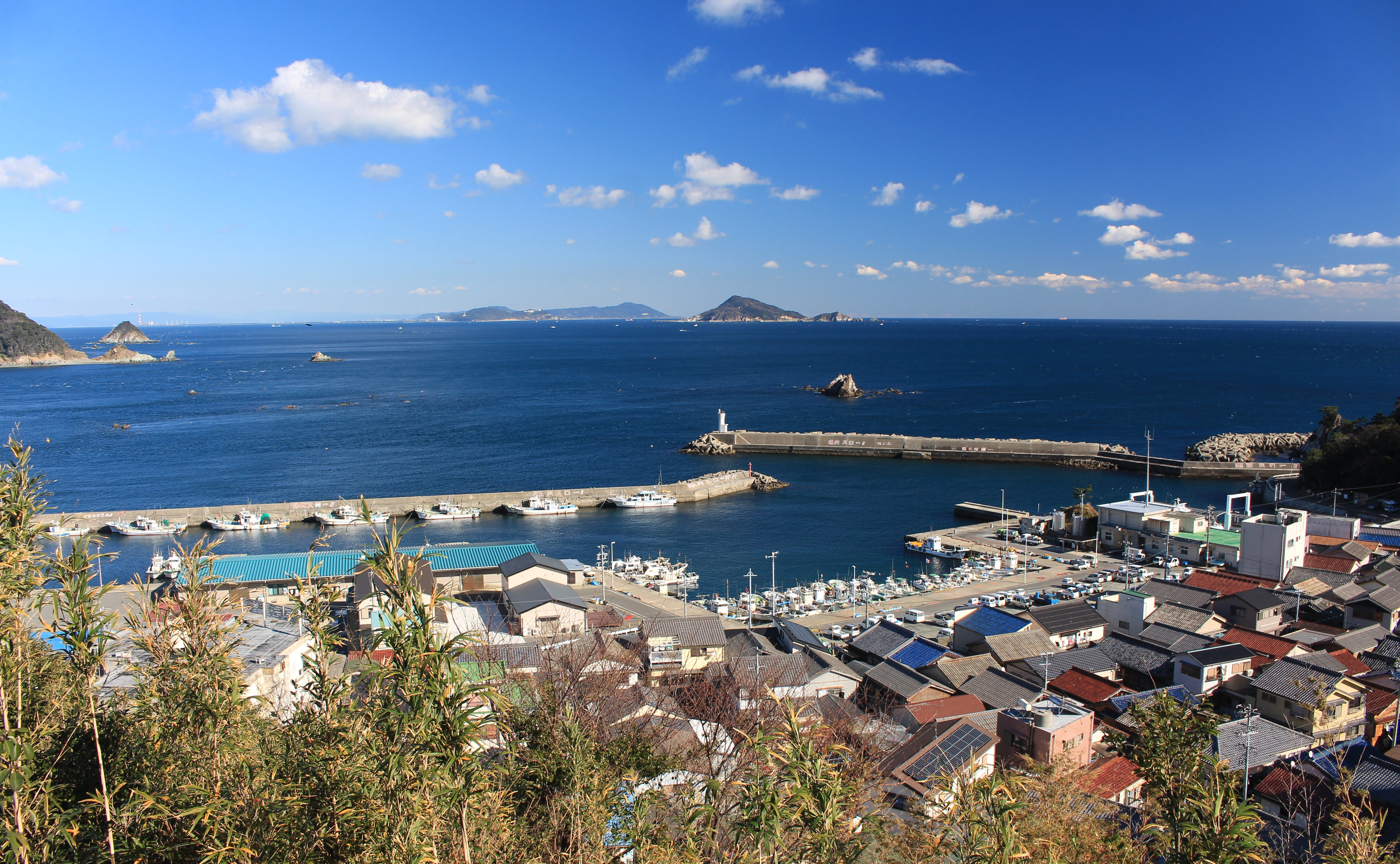
Port of Tōshi
