= Kami-shima =

Island off the east coast of central Honshu, Japan

Native name: Kami-shima (神島)
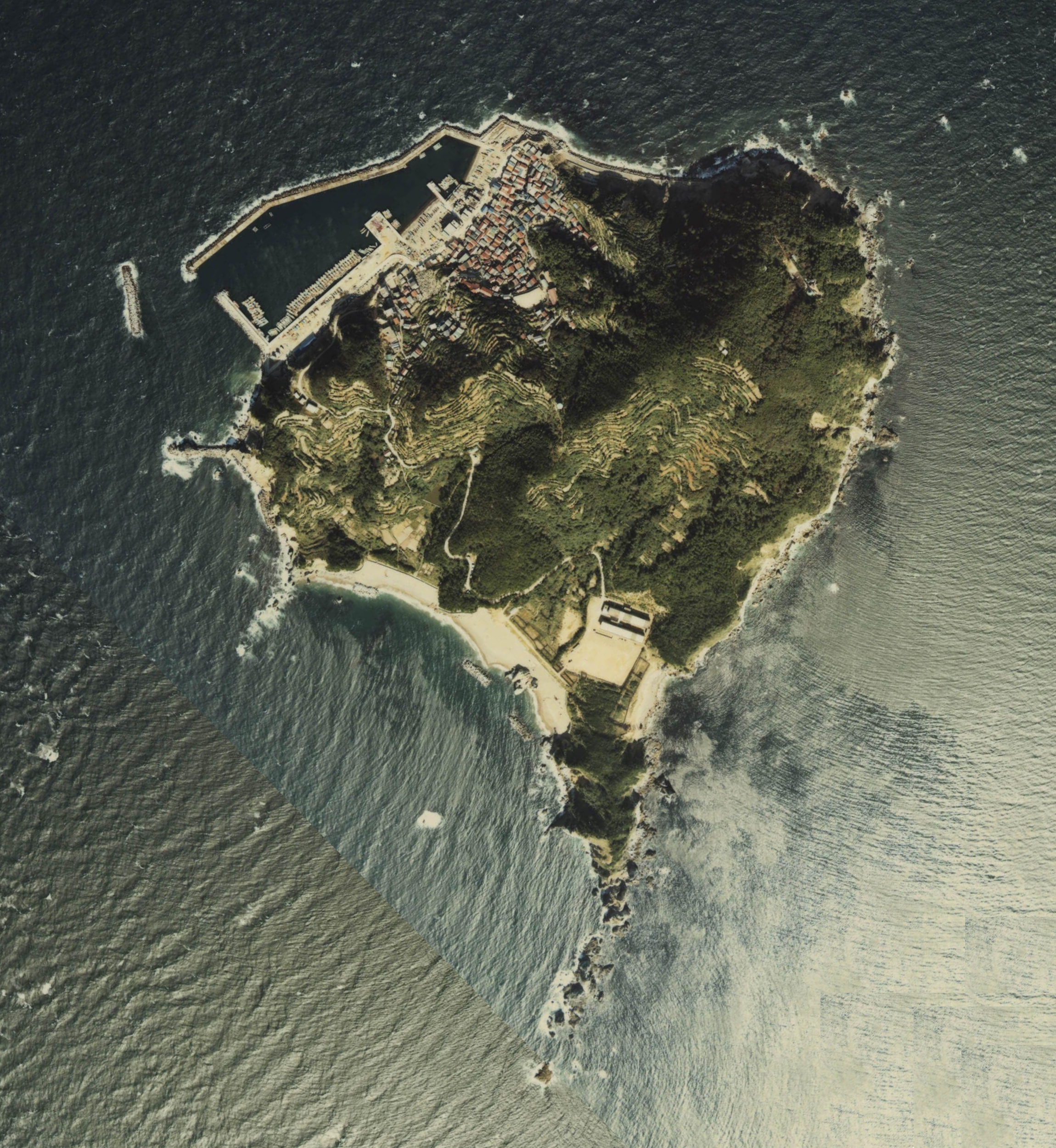
- National Land Image Information (Color Aerial Photographs), Ministry of Land, Infrastructure, Transport and Tourism.
- Interactive map of Kami-shima

Geography
- Location: Mie Prefecture
- Coordinates: 34°32′N 136°59′E
- Area: 0.75 km^{2} (0.29 sq mi)
- Coastline: 3,900 m (12800 ft)
- Highest elevation: 171 m (561 ft)
- Highest point: Tōmyōyama

Administration
- Japan

Demographics
- Population: 534 (2000)
- Pop. density: 703/km^{2} (1821/sq mi)
- Ethnic groups: Japanese

Kami-shima (神島) is an inhabited island at the mouth of Ise Bay off the east coast of central Honshu, Japan. It is administered by the city of Toba in Mie Prefecture.

The name for Kami-shima has alternatively been written as Kameshima (亀島) or Kajima (歌島). The current name Kami-shima, or “God island,” refers to a Shinto shrine on the island called Yatsushiro shrine. Archaeologists have found hundreds of ceremonial artifacts on the island, ranging from ancient mirrors to ceramics dating from the Kofun period through the Muromachi period. During the Edo period, the island was used as a prison by Toba Domain, with the sobriquet “Shima-Hachijo” in reference to the prison island of Hachijō-jima used by the Tokugawa shogunate.

The economy of the island is based on commercial fishing in its adjacent waters, and on tourism. Commercial fishing is the dominant industry.

== In popular culture ==
The island is the setting for the 1954 novel by Yukio Mishima The Sound of Waves, and has been used several times as a filming location for movies.

A fictionalized version of the island is used as the primary setting for the video game Paranormasight: The Mermaid's Curse.

== Gallery ==
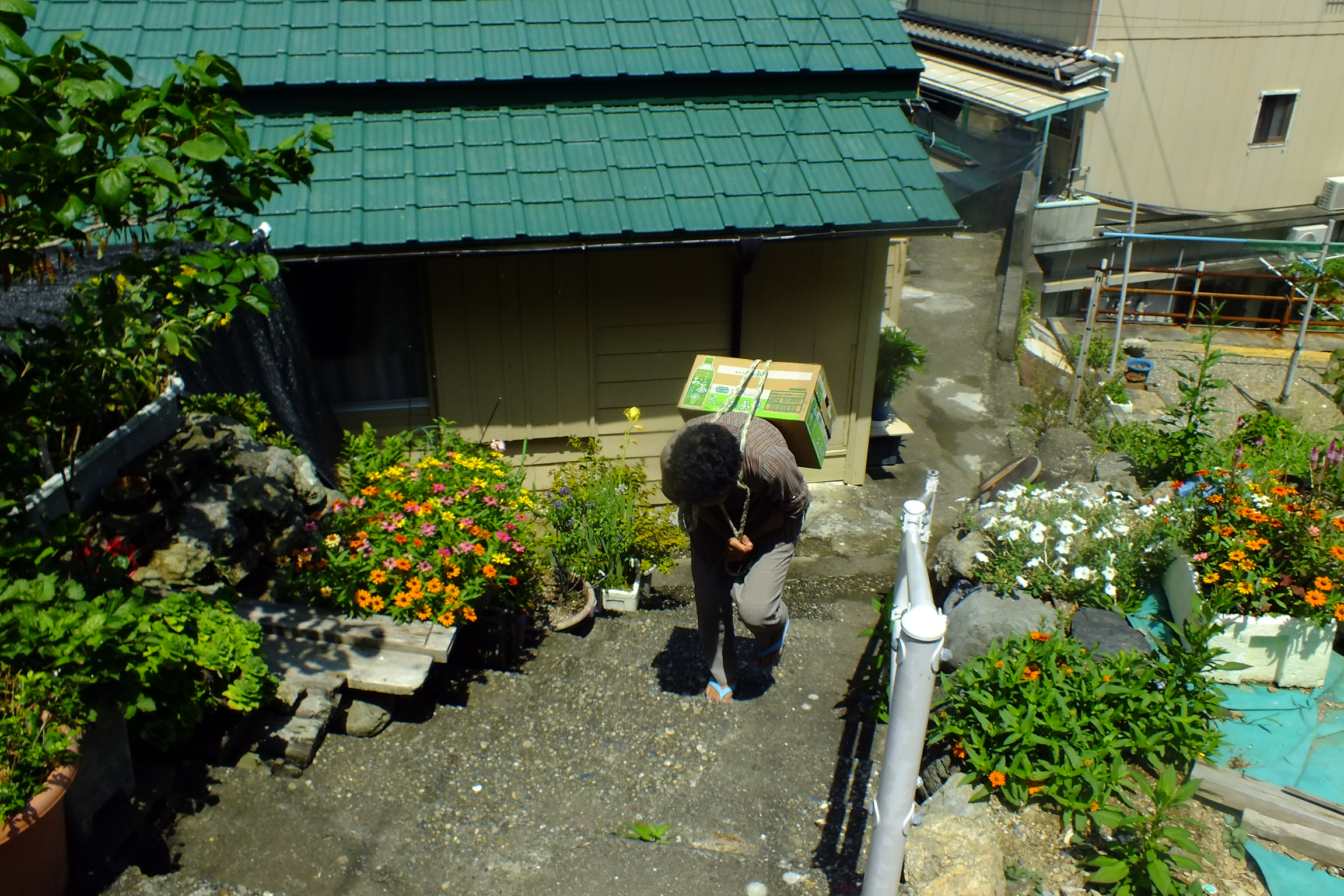
Climbing stairs on Kami Island

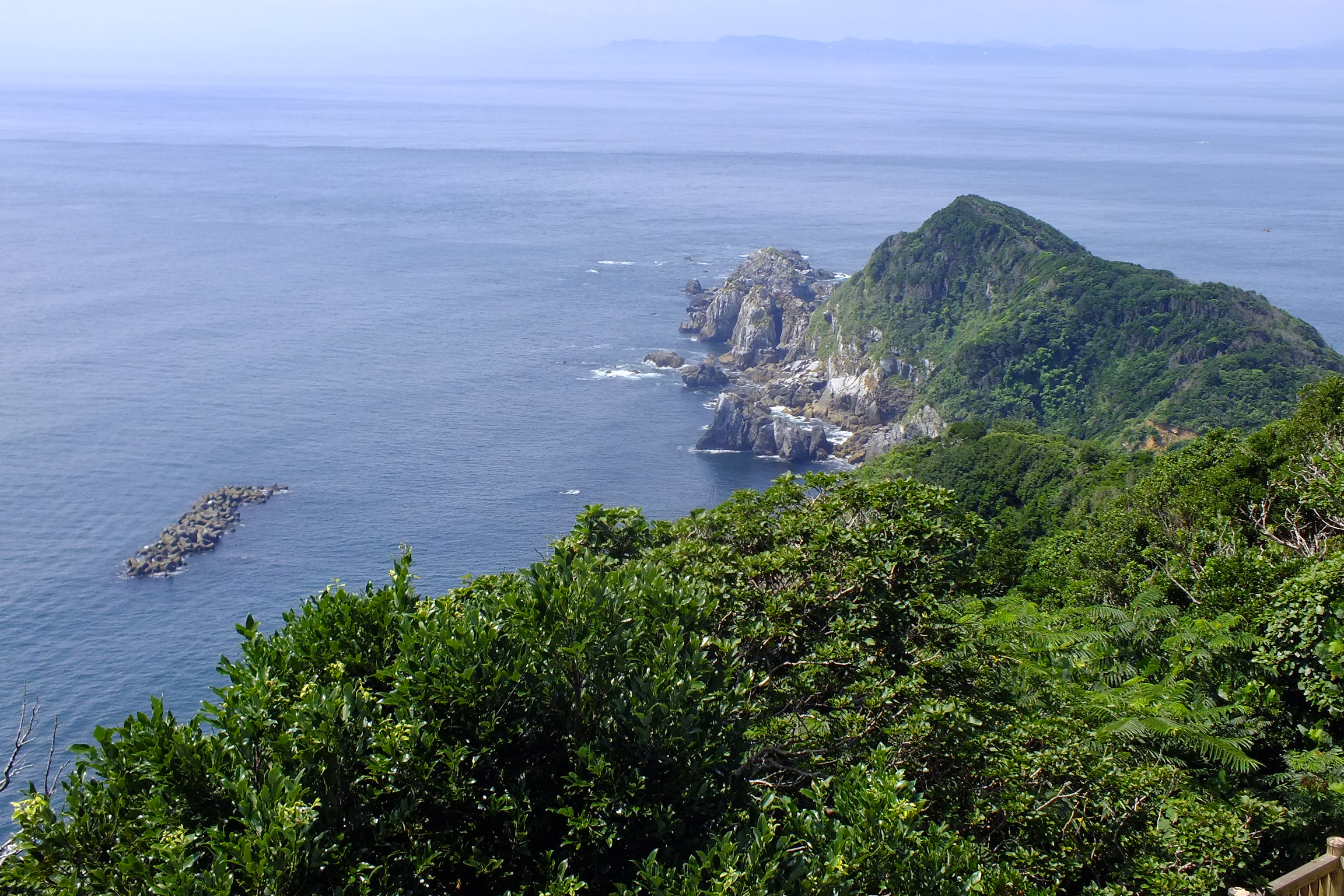
Benten-misaki

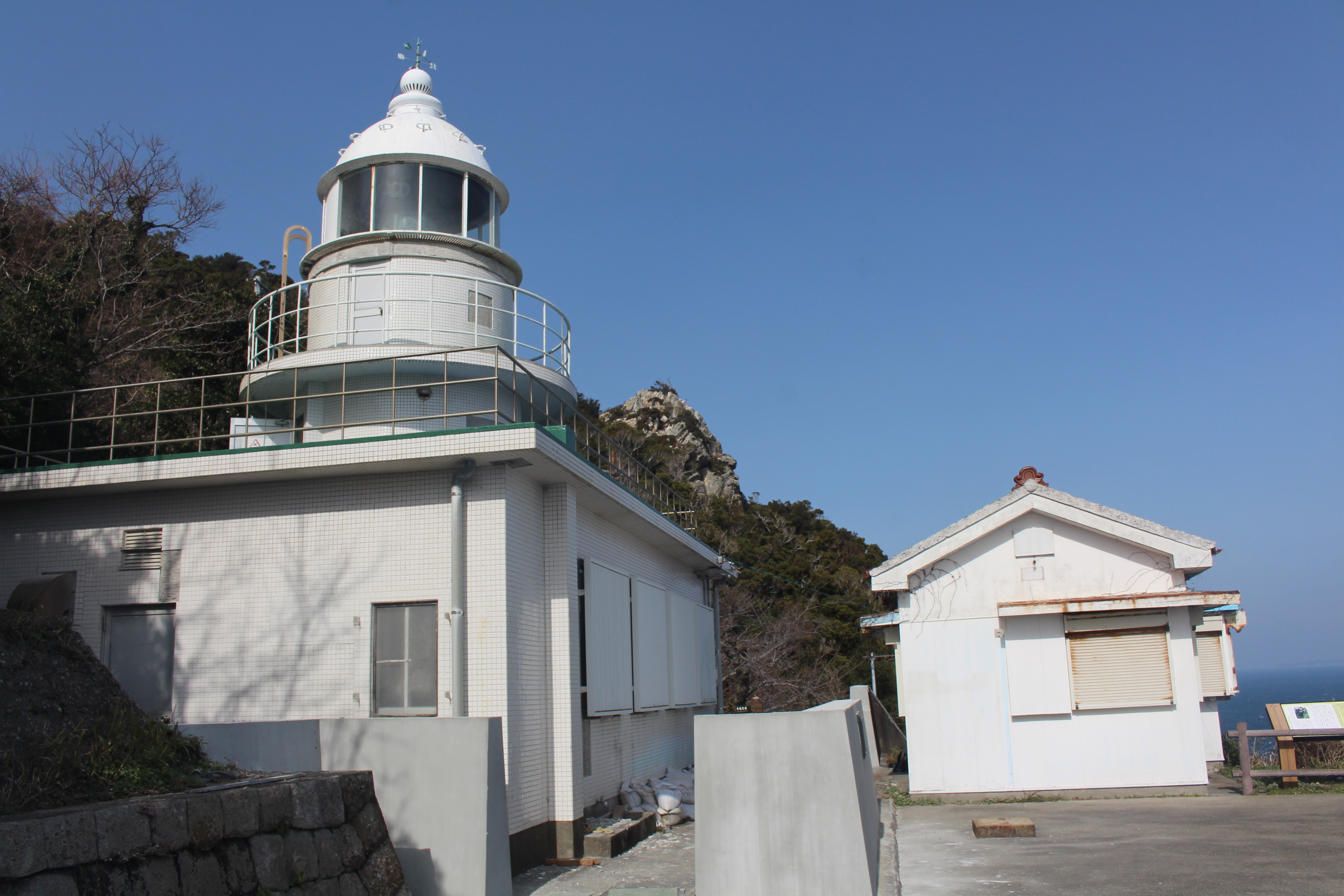
Kamishima Lighthouse

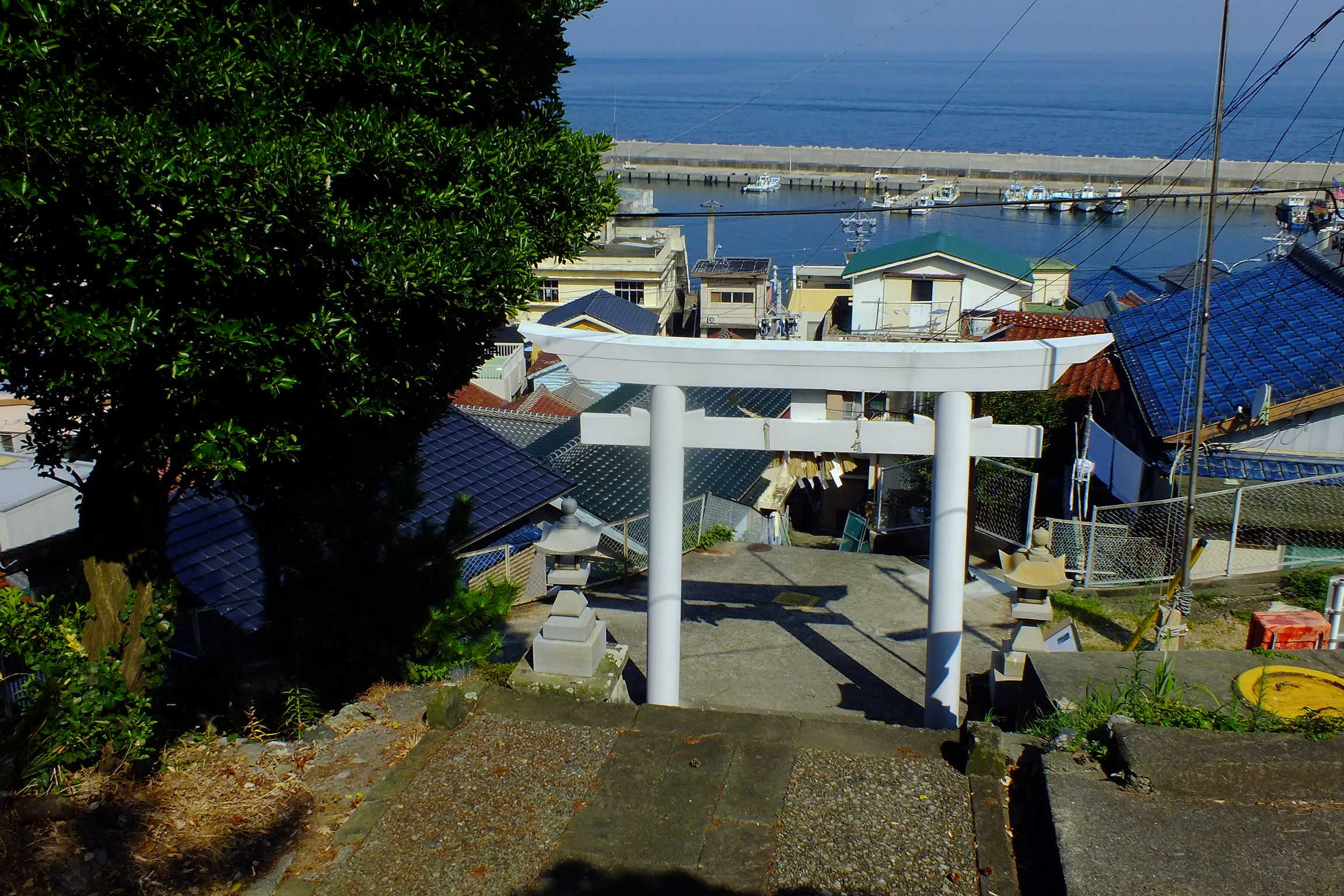
Yatsushiro shrine

== See also ==
- Kamishima Island, Amakusa
