= Toba Line =

Railway line in Japan

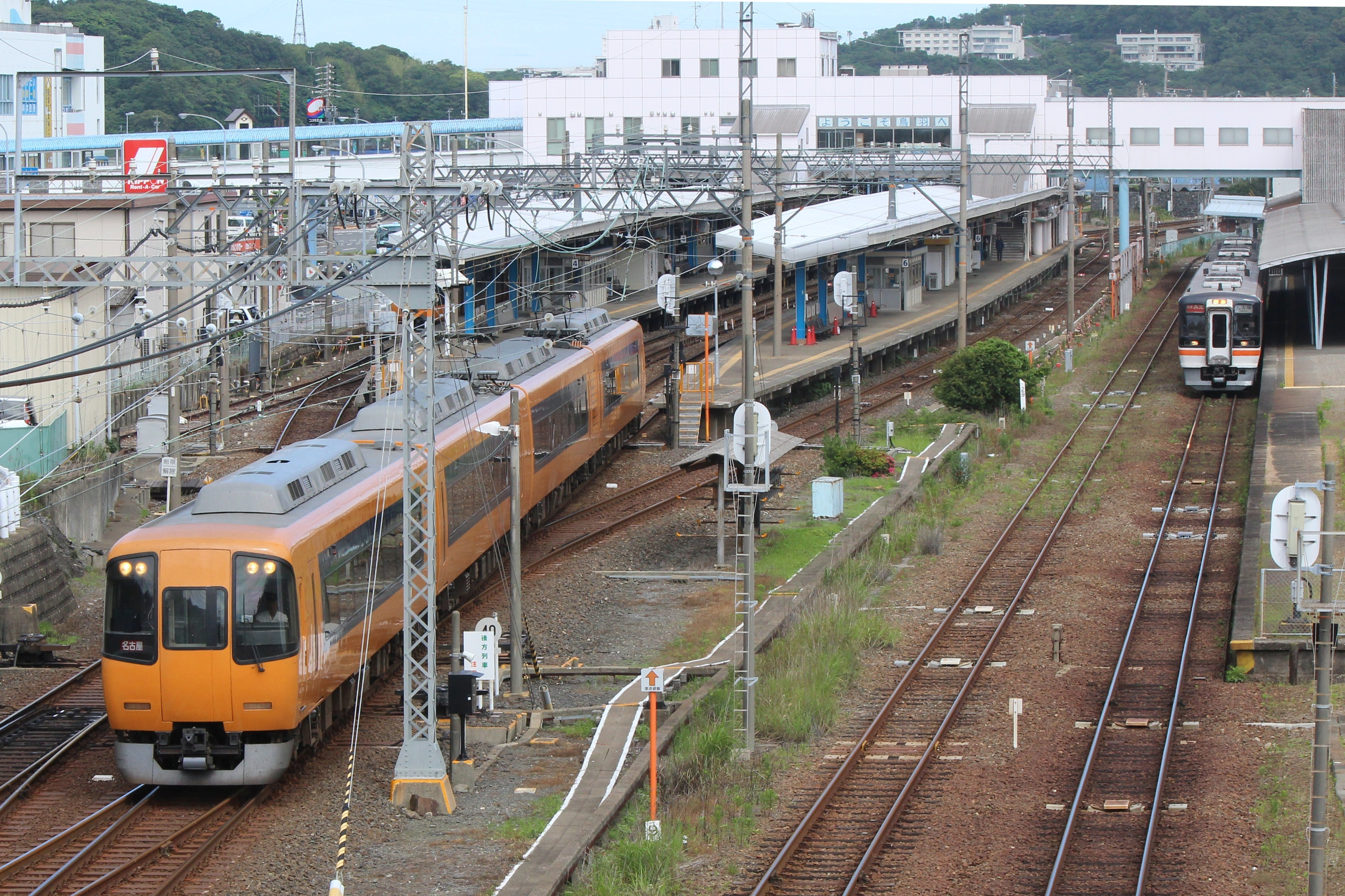
- 22000 series train on Limited Express leaving Toba Station

Overview
- Owner: Kintetsu Railway
- Line number: M
- Locale: Mie Prefecture
- Termini: Ujiyamada; Toba
- Stations: 5
- Color on map: (#00b3c1)

Service
- Type: Commuter rail
- System: Kintetsu railway
- Operator(s): Kintetsu Railway

History
- Opened: 15 December 1969; 56 years ago (Initial segment); 1 March 1970; 55 years ago (Full line)

Technical
- Line length: 13.2 km (8.2 mi)
- Number of tracks: Double-track
- Track gauge: 1,435 mm (4 ft 8 1/2 in) standard gauge
- Electrification: 1,500 V DC (Overhead line)
- Operating speed: 130 km/h (81 mph)
- Signalling: Automatic closing block
- Train protection system: Kintetsu ATS

The Toba Line (鳥羽線, Toba-sen) is a railway line operated by the Japanese private railway company Kintetsu Railway, connecting Ujiyamada Station in Ise, Mie with Toba Station in Toba, Mie. The line runs parallel to JR Central's Sangū Line.

The line connects with the Yamada Line at Ujiyamada Station and the Shima Line at Toba Station. The Yamada Line, Toba Line, and Shima Line form a single train line that begins at Ise-Nakagawa Station and serves the Ise-Shima tourist region.

== Service outline ==
LO Local (普通; futsū)

For Ise-Nakagawa
For Toba, Kashikojima
(Locals stop at every station.)

EX Express (急行; kyūkō)

For Osaka Uehommachi; via Nabari and Yamato-Yagi (Kashihara)
For Nagoya; via Tsu and Yokkaichi
For Toba
(Expresses typically end at Ujiyamada and Isuzugawa, occasionally run all the way to Toba.)

RE Rapid Express (快速急行; kaisoku-kyūkō)

For Osaka Uehommachi; via Nabari and Yamato-Yagi (Kashihara)
For Toba
(Only runs mornings and evenings.)
(Rapid expresses typically end at Ujiyamada and Isuzugawa, occasionally run all the way to Toba.)

LE Limited Express (特急; tokkyū)

For Osaka Namba and Osaka Uehommachi; via Nabari and Yamato-Yagi (Kashihara)
For Kyoto; via Yamato-Saidaiji (Nara)
For Nagoya; via Tsu and Yokkaichi
For Toba, Kashikojima
(Seat reservations and limited express fee required.)

NS Non-stop Limited Express (ノンストップ特急; nonsutoppu tokkyū)

For Osaka Namba
For Nagoya
For Kashikojima
(Runs twice a day on weekends.)
(Seat reservations and limited express fee required.)

SV Premium Express Shimakaze (しまかぜ; Shimakaze)

For Osaka Namba
For Kyoto
For Nagoya
For Kashikojima
(Train to and from Osaka runs once a day except on Tuesday with some exceptions.)
(Train to and from Kyoto runs once a day except on Wednesday with some exceptions.)
(Train to and from Nagoya runs once a day except on Thursday with some exceptions.)
(Seat reservations, limited express fee and "Shimakaze" special vehicle fee required.)

== Stations ==
Legend
●	Trains stop here
○	Trains stop here sometimes
|	Trains do not stop here

No.	Station		Distance (km)	Transfers	LO	EX	RE	LE	NS	SV	Location	
M74	Ujiyamada	宇治山田	0.0	M Yamada Line	●	●	●	●	●	●	Ise	Mie Prefecture
M75	Isuzugawa	五十鈴川	1.9		●	●	●	●	|	|	Ise	Mie Prefecture
M76	Asama	朝熊	4.9		●	●	●	|	|	|	Ise	Mie Prefecture
M77	Ikenoura	池の浦	10.6		●	●	●	|	|	|	Toba	Mie Prefecture
M78	Toba	鳥羽	13.2	Sangū Line; M Shima Line	●	●	●	●	●	●	Toba	Mie Prefecture

== History ==
The Toba Line was constructed in the late 1960s / early 1970s to allow Kintetsu to run limited express trains from Osaka and Nagoya as far as Kashikojima in Shima. The decision to build the line was based on Kintetsu wanting to attract visitors from among the many people attending the 1970 World's Fair in Osaka to the Ise-Shima region where Kintetsu runs a variety of tourism business enterprises, and direct rail service would largely improve the bus system that was in place at that time, thereby making it more convenient to travel there.

=== The final link ===
Originally, what are now the Osaka Line and the Yamada Line were completed in the late 1920s / early 1930s by two separate companies, but both lines came under the control of Kintetsu in the 1940s. This made possible direct rail service from Osaka to Ise (at that time called Ujiyamada), primarily used by tourists and pilgrims going to Ise Grand Shrine. Also completed in the late 1920s was what is now the Shima Line which runs from Toba to Kashikojima. This line was built by a third independent railway company and went through the ownership of various companies over the years, finally falling under the umbrella of Kintetsu in 1965.

Kintetsu now owned train lines that stretched from both Osaka and Nagoya as far as Ise (Ujiyamada Station) as well as a small disconnected line running between Toba and Shima (Kashikojima Station), however there was no Kintetsu rail link between Ise and Toba, meaning Kintetsu passengers bound for Shima had to switch from train to a bus (or a train run by Kintetsu’s main competitor, JNR) in Ise, then back to another Kintetsu train in Toba to complete the journey. The first solution, implemented in the 1960s, was building a bus ramp right up to the train platform of Ujiyamada Station and running buses that were timed to match up with the arriving limited expresses from Osaka and Nagoya, allowing passengers on those trains to easily switch to the bus without leaving the station or waiting long. However, in preparation for the 1970 World's Fair, Kintetsu decided it was a good time to implement the ideal solution which was direct rail access all the way to Kashikojima; thus the Toba Line was built to provide the final link.

Construction commenced in 1968 and a single track, connecting the Yamada Line and the Shima Line, was completed in 1970 just two weeks before the World's Fair began. Trains on this single-track Toba Line waited for each other to pass at a signal station located between Asama Station and Ikenoura Station near the line's midpoint. The line was officially completed when a second track was finished in 1975, thereby allowing bi-directional travel at all times.

=== Timeline ===
- May 1, 1968 - Construction begins.
- December 15, 1969 - First track opens on Ujiyamada ~ Isuzugawa section.
- March 1, 1970 - First track opens on Isuzugawa ~ Toba section. Direct service from both Osaka and Nagoya to Kashikojima begins.
- December 25, 1971 - Second track opens on Ujiyamada ~ Isuzugawa section.
- April 11, 1975 - Second track opens on Isuzugawa ~ Asama section.
- December 20, 1975 - Second track opens on Asama ~ Toba section. Bi-directional service begins; Shigō Signal Station is closed.
- May 30, 2001: Wanman driver-only train service begins.
