= Sakatejima =

Island off the east coast of central Honshu, Japan

Native name: 坂手島
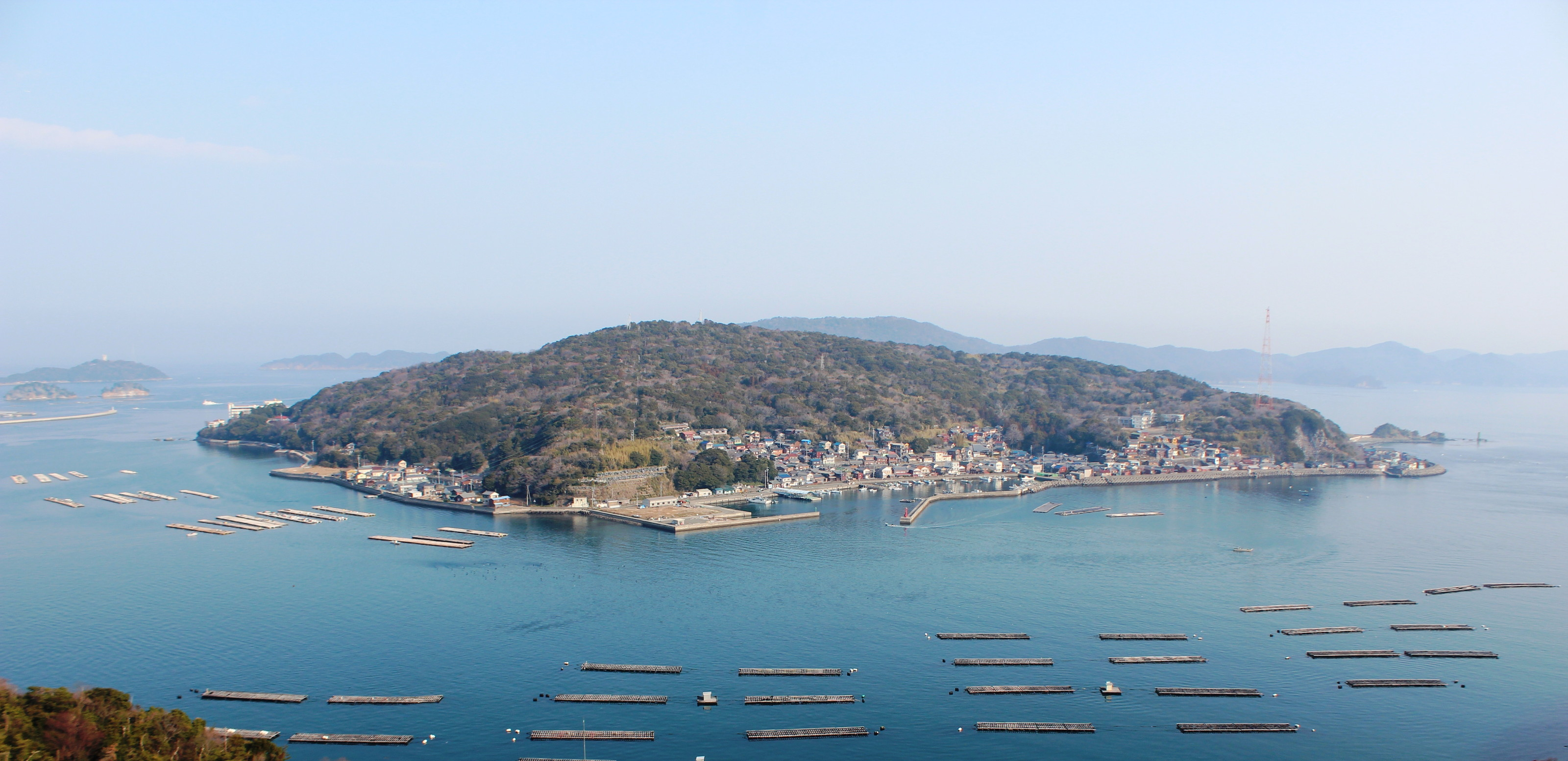
- Sakatejima
- Interactive map of Sakatejima

Geography
- Location: Mie Prefecture
- Coordinates: 34°29′5.3″N 136°51′34.1″E
- Area: 0.51 km^{2} (0.20 sq mi)
- Coastline: 3,800 m (12500 ft)

Administration
- Japan

Demographics
- Population: 460 (March 2011)
- Pop. density: 902/km^{2} (2336/sq mi)
- Ethnic groups: Japanese

Sakatejima (坂手島) also known as Sakate Sima, Sakate-jima, or Sakate-shima, is an island located in Ise Bay off the east coast of central Honshu, Japan. It is administered as part of the city of Toba in Mie Prefecture. It is the smallest of the four inhabited islands of Toba, and is the closest of the four islands to the mainland. Landmarks in the area include Toba-kō and Nakanogō-eki. Time zone is Asia/Tokyo.

Sakatejima is connected to mainland Toba by a public ferry. Most of the population is engaged in commercial fishing or fish processing, tourism, or commute to mainland Toba for work.

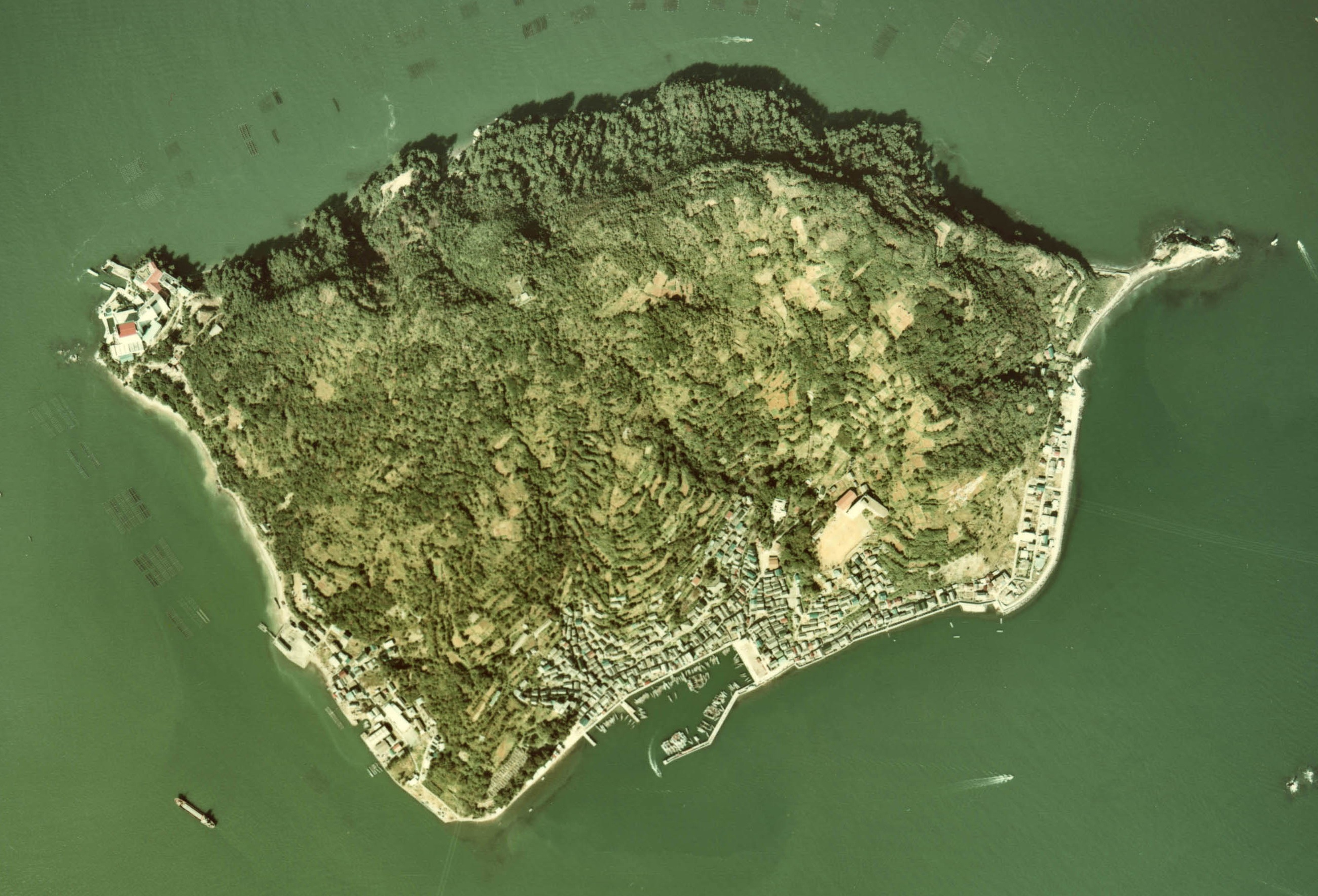
Satellite view of Sakatejima (from the Geospatial Information Authority of Japan)

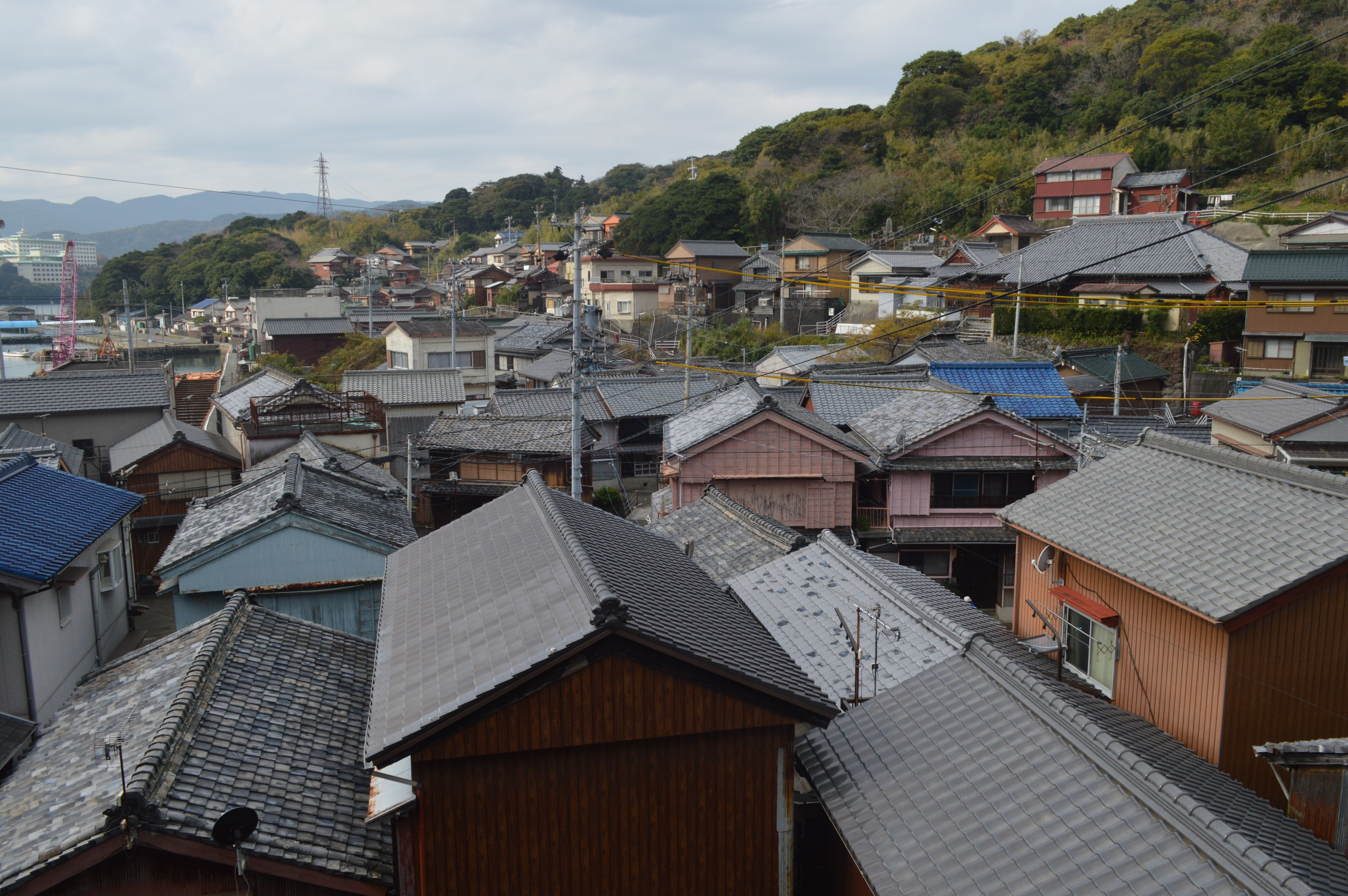
View of the town on the island, 2021

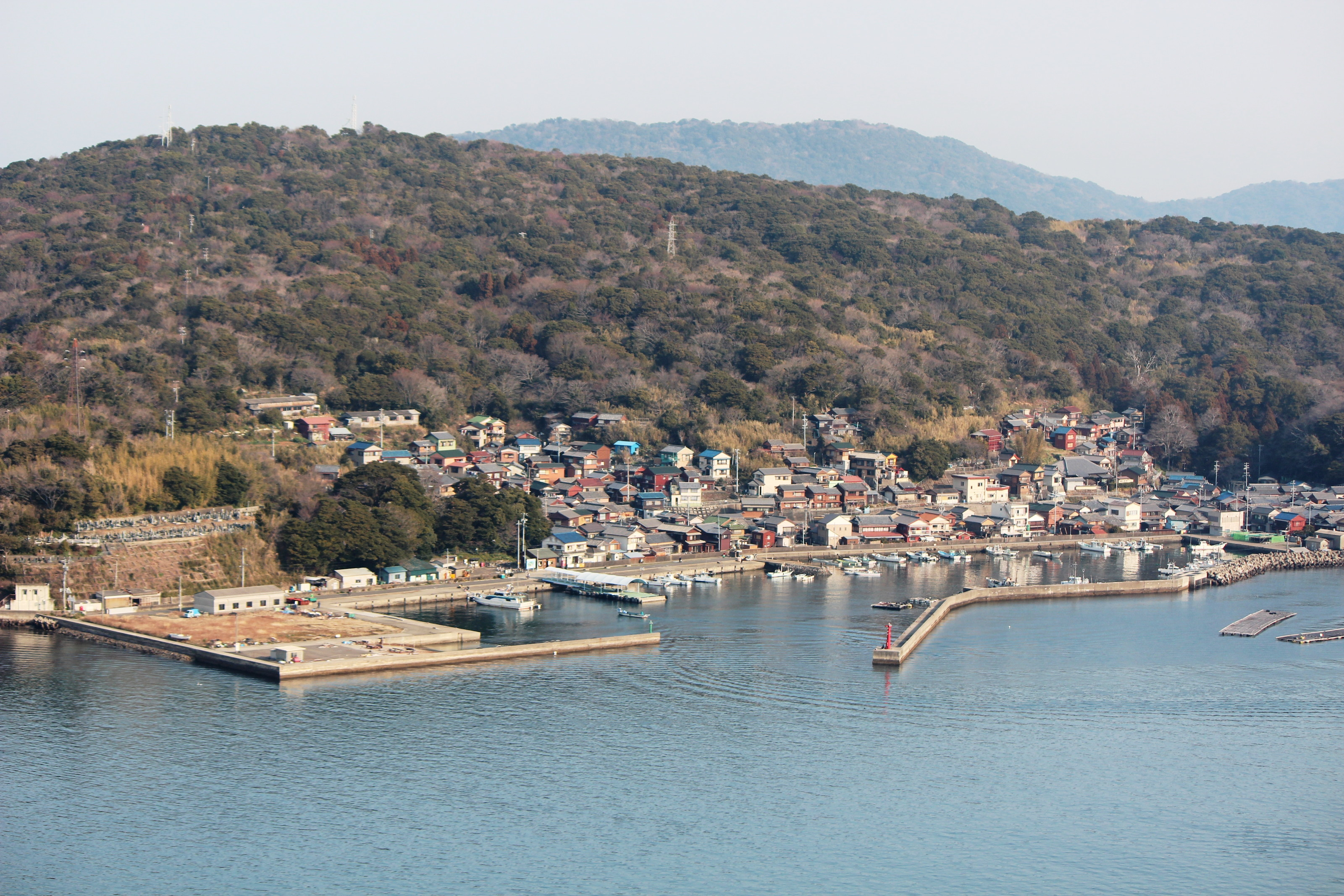
The port, 2013
