= Toba, Mie =

Toba 鳥羽市
- City
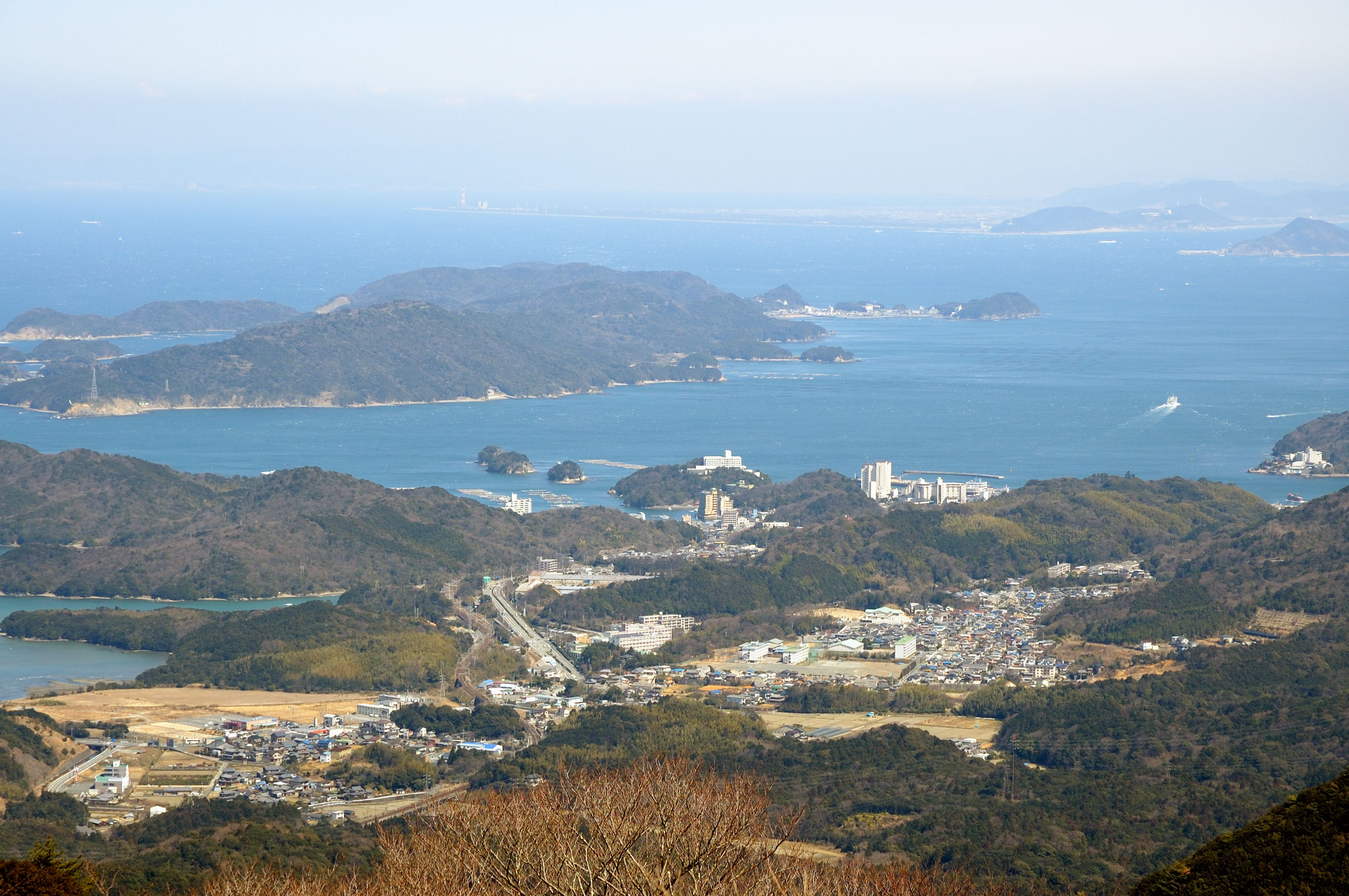
- Overview of Toba

- Flag Emblem

- Location of Toba in Mie Prefecture

- Coordinates: 34°28′52.8″N 136°50′36.3″E
- Country: Japan
- Region: Kansai
- Prefecture: Mie
- First official recorded: 712 AD (official estimated)
- Toba town settled: April 1, 1889
- Toba city settled: November 1, 1954

Government
  - Mayor: Atsushi Kotake (小竹篤) - from April 2025

Area
  - Total: 107.34 km^{2} (41.44 sq mi)

Population (July 2021)
  - Total: 17,741
  - Density: 165.28/km^{2} (428.07/sq mi)
- Time zone: UTC+9 (Japan Standard Time)
- Phone number: 0599-25-1112
- Address: 3-1-1 Toba, Toba-shi, Mie-ken 517-0011
- Climate: Cfa
- Website: Official website
- Symbols
- Bird: Common gull
- Flower: Dianthus
- Tree: Tachibana

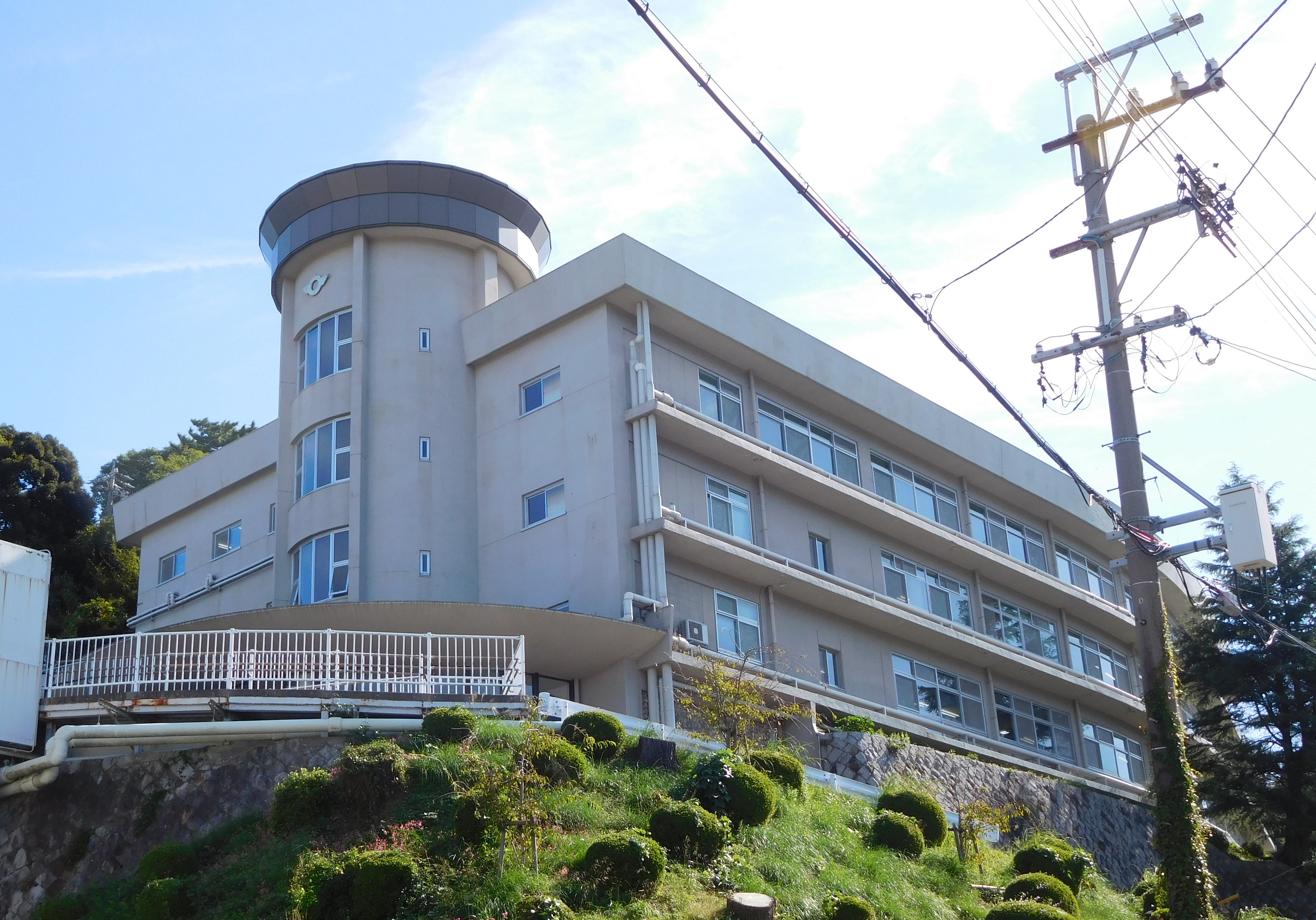
Toba City Hall

Toba (鳥羽市, Toba-shi) is a city located in Mie Prefecture, Japan. As of 31 July 2021, the city had an estimated population of 17,741 in 8328 households and a population density of 170 persons per km^{2}. The total area of the city is 107.34 square kilometres (41.44 sq mi).

== Geography ==
Toba is located on the northeastern tip of Shima Peninsula in far eastern Mie Prefecture, facing Ise Bay of the Pacific Ocean to the north and east. The area is famous for oysters and for cultured pearls. The entire city area is within the borders of the Ise-Shima National Park.

Toba administers numerous islands in the Ise Bay, the most important of which are:

- Kamishima
- Kozukumi Island
- Mitsujima
- Ōzukumi-jima
- Sakatejima
- Sugashima
- Tōshijima

=== Climate ===
Toba has a humid subtropical climate (Köppen Cfa) characterized by warm summers and cool winters with light to no snowfall. The average annual temperature in Toba is 15.6 °C (60.1 °F). The average annual rainfall is 2,428.5 mm (95.61 in) with September as the wettest month. The temperatures are highest on average in August, at around 26.9 °C (80.4 °F), and lowest in January, at around 5.2 °C (41.4 °F).

Climate data for Toba (1991−2020 normals, extremes 1977−present)
Month	Jan	Feb	Mar	Apr	May	Jun	Jul	Aug	Sep	Oct	Nov	Dec	Year
Record high °C (°F)	18.2 (64.8)	21.4 (70.5)	24.1 (75.4)	29.1 (84.4)	32.6 (90.7)	35.2 (95.4)	37.3 (99.1)	38.3 (100.9)	36.6 (97.9)	30.4 (86.7)	25.6 (78.1)	24.5 (76.1)	38.3 (100.9)
Mean daily maximum °C (°F)	8.9 (48.0)	9.5 (49.1)	13.2 (55.8)	18.6 (65.5)	23.0 (73.4)	25.9 (78.6)	30.0 (86.0)	31.2 (88.2)	27.4 (81.3)	21.9 (71.4)	16.5 (61.7)	11.4 (52.5)	19.8 (67.6)
Daily mean °C (°F)	5.2 (41.4)	5.5 (41.9)	8.6 (47.5)	13.7 (56.7)	18.2 (64.8)	21.7 (71.1)	25.8 (78.4)	26.9 (80.4)	23.5 (74.3)	18.1 (64.6)	12.6 (54.7)	7.6 (45.7)	15.6 (60.1)
Mean daily minimum °C (°F)	1.6 (34.9)	1.7 (35.1)	4.3 (39.7)	9.0 (48.2)	13.7 (56.7)	18.2 (64.8)	22.5 (72.5)	23.5 (74.3)	20.3 (68.5)	14.6 (58.3)	8.7 (47.7)	3.7 (38.7)	11.8 (53.3)
Record low °C (°F)	−5.2 (22.6)	−4.9 (23.2)	−2.9 (26.8)	−0.2 (31.6)	5.5 (41.9)	11.4 (52.5)	15.6 (60.1)	17.4 (63.3)	12.4 (54.3)	5.8 (42.4)	−0.5 (31.1)	−3.4 (25.9)	−5.2 (22.6)
Average precipitation mm (inches)	82.4 (3.24)	90.2 (3.55)	174.3 (6.86)	212.2 (8.35)	256.3 (10.09)	264.3 (10.41)	204.6 (8.06)	187.0 (7.36)	399.0 (15.71)	330.1 (13.00)	141.9 (5.59)	86.4 (3.40)	2,428.5 (95.61)
Average precipitation days (≥ 1.0 mm)	5.6	6.2	9.9	10.0	10.9	13.1	11.6	8.9	12.6	11.1	6.9	5.9	112.7
Mean monthly sunshine hours	180.6	167.6	191.4	194.9	199.4	148.9	182.9	215.6	152.1	158.3	160.2	176.9	2,128.7
Source: Japan Meteorological Agency

=== Demographics ===
The population of Toba has decreased rapidly over the past 30 years.

Historical population
Year	Pop.	±%
1920	24,640	—
1930	23,632	−4.1%
1940	24,488	+3.6%
1950	30,222	+23.4%
1960	30,521	+1.0%
1970	29,462	−3.5%
1980	28,812	−2.2%
1990	27,320	−5.2%
2000	24,945	−8.7%
2010	21,413	−14.2%

== History ==
The area of modern Toba has been continuously inhabited since before the Jōmon period. During the Sengoku period, the area was under the control of pirates, from whom emerged Kuki Yoshitaka (from Nakiri district) as a dominant ruler. After having dominated the local seacoasts, he established Toba as his capital and built a castle there. Under the Tokugawa shogunate, the castle became the center for Toba Domain. In the Edo period, Toba flourished in trade and as a transshipment port between Osaka and Edo.

The town of Toba was created with the establishment of the modern municipalities system on April 1, 1889. Toba was raised to city status on November 1, 1954, by merging with seven neighboring villages in Shima District.

== Government ==
Toba has a mayor-council form of government with a directly elected mayor and a unicameral city council of 14 members. Toba contributes one member to the Mie Prefectural Assembly. In terms of national politics, the city is part of Mie 4th district of the lower house of the Diet of Japan.

== Economy ==
Commercial fishing, including cultivated pearls, and tourism play important roles in the local economy.

== Education ==
Toba has nine public elementary schools and five public middle schools operated by the city government and one public high school operated by the Mie Prefectural Department of Education. The Toba National College of Maritime Technology, one of the five maritime technology colleges in Japan which offers merchant marine programs such as Deck officer, Marine Engineering and other advanced programs related to maritime education. is located in Toba, as is the Sugashima Marine Biological Laboratory - Graduate School of Science, Nagoya University.

== Culture ==
=== Ama ===
Toba City hosts the highest number of ama divers in Japan [5]. These ama divers dive down to an approximate depth of 10 meters and dive without an oxygen tank. Using simple tools such as glass goggles (Iso-megane), a metal pry (kaginomi), and fins, they harvest abalones, sea turban shells, sea urchins, and seaweed and more. Using the metal pry bar, they used it to detach and harvest shellfish such as abalone from sea rocks.

=== Maruchachi ===
Maruhachi is a talisman that can be found, drawn in ink, throughout Tōshijima. It is a crest of the Hachiman shrine, and it prays for a bountiful catch as well as safety in the sea. Drawn with charcoal, it is drawn on the outside of houses as well as on boats by local.

=== Neyako ===
Neyako is a system in which five to six boys who have graduated high school leave their house and stay communally at a "Neyako" (sleeping room) led by a "Neyaoya" (sleeping parent) who acts as a mentor. This is done to keep local traditions alive as well as create lifelong bonds between the boys.

== Transportation ==
=== Railway ===
JR Tōkai - Sangū Line

- Toba

Kintetsu Railway - Toba Line

- Ikenoura - Toba

Kintetsu Railway - Shima Line

- Toba - Nakanogō - Shima-Akasaki - Funatsu - Kamo - Matsuo - Shiraki

=== Highway ===
- Iseshima Skyline
- National Route 42
- National Route 167
- National Route 259

=== Ferry ===
- Ise-wan Ferry

== Local attractions ==
- Mikimoto Pearl Island
- Toba Aquarium
- Toba Castle
- Toba Sea-Folk Museum

== Sister city relations ==
- Santa Barbara, California, United States, since 1966
- (Japan) Sanda, Hyōgo, friendship city since July 1, 1971

== Notable people from Toba ==
- Mitsuru Hattori, Manga artist
- Tsunekazu Ishihara, President of The Pokémon Company
- Mikimoto Kōkichi, Entrepreneur and businessman
