= Sugashima =

Island in Ise Bay, Mie Prefecture, Japan

Native name: 菅島
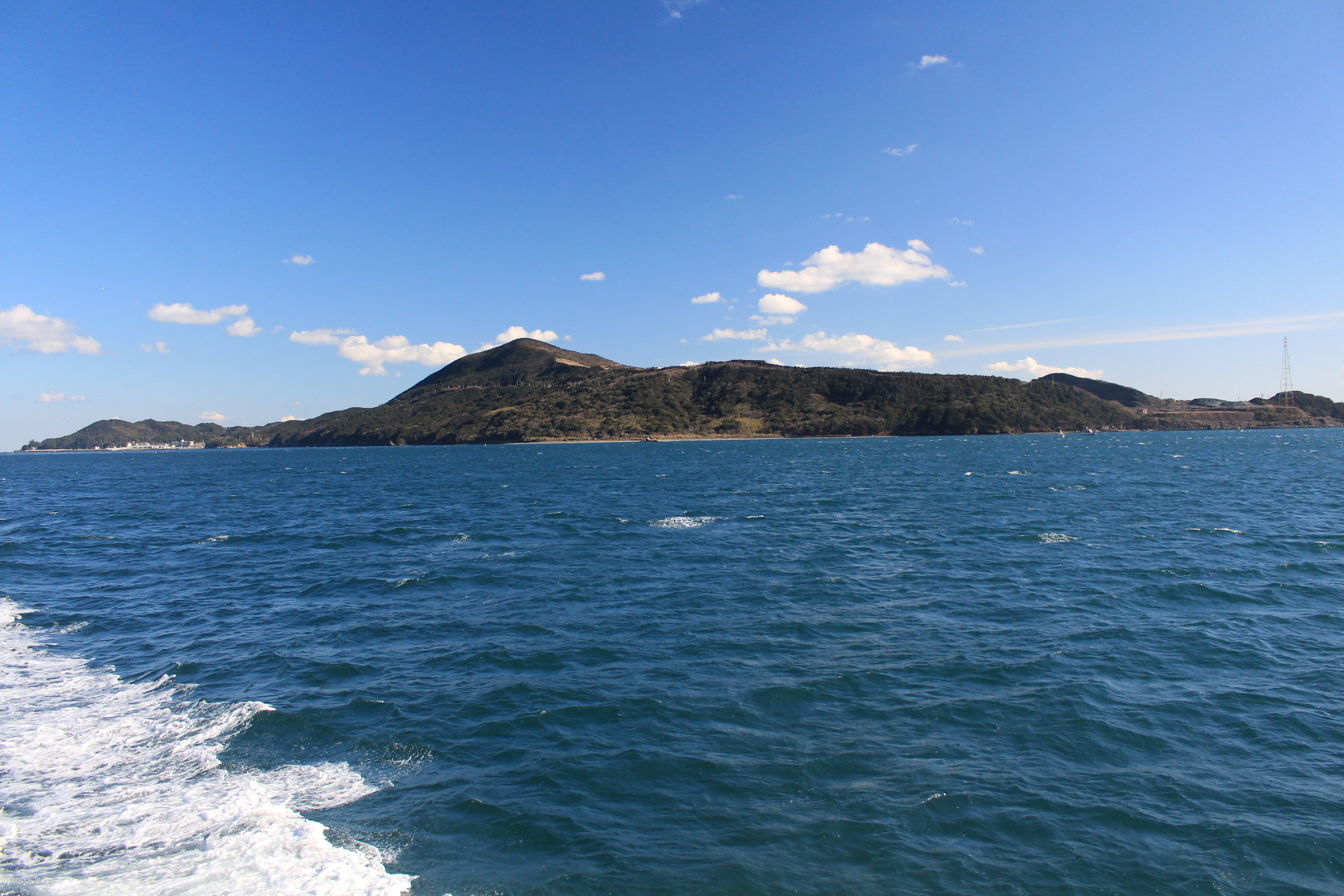
- Sugashima from ship
- Interactive map of Sugashima

Geography
- Location: Mie Prefecture
- Coordinates: 34°32′N 136°59′E
- Area: 4.52 km^{2} (1.75 sq mi)
- Coastline: 13,000 m (43000 ft)
- Highest elevation: 236 m (774 ft)
- Highest point: Oyama

Administration
- Japan

Demographics
- Population: 741 (2005)
- Ethnic groups: Japanese

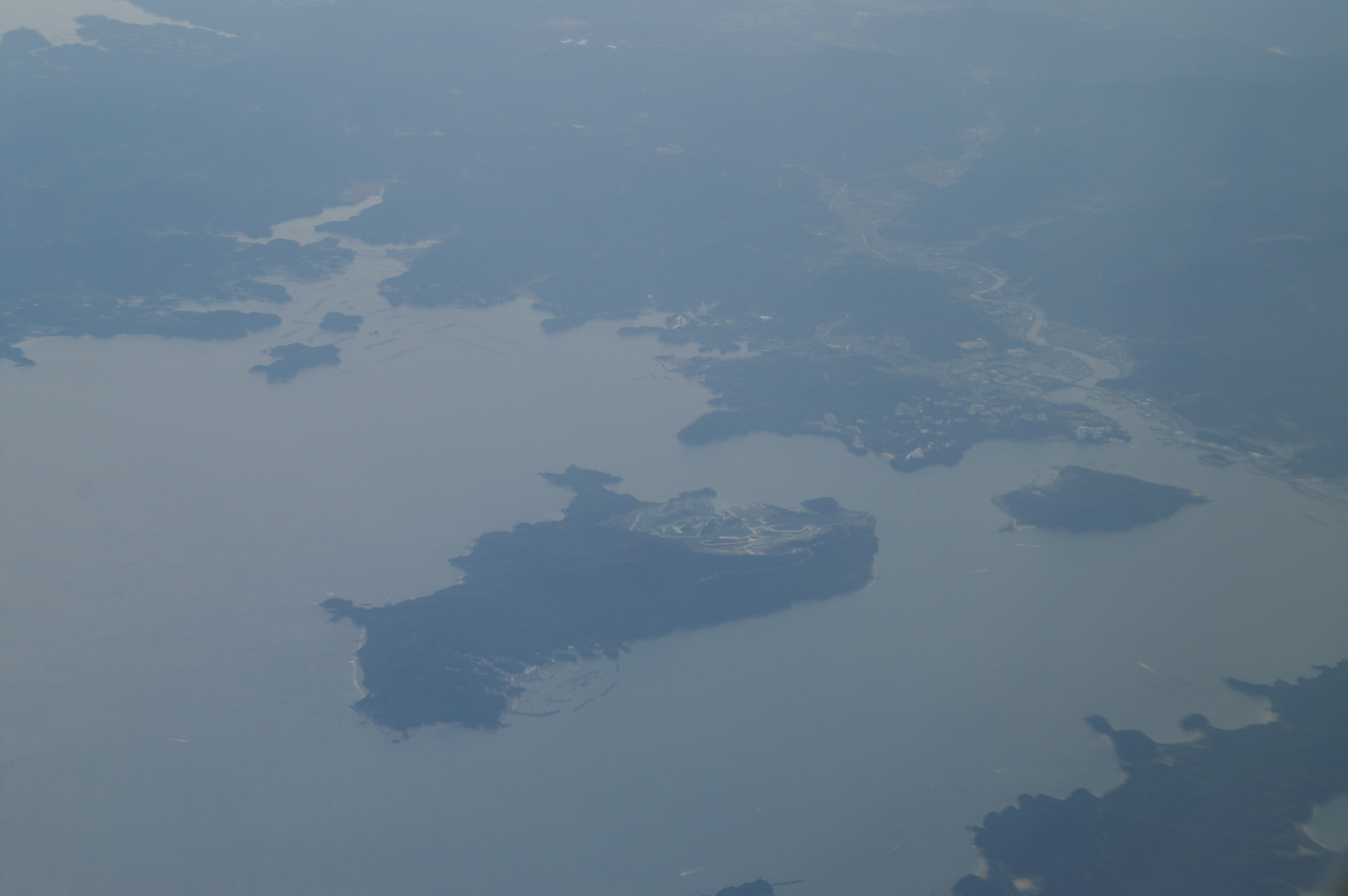
Sugashima from aircraft

Sugashima (菅島) is an inhabited island located in Ise Bay off the east coast of central Honshu, Japan. It is administered as part of the city of Toba in Mie Prefecture. It is the second largest of the outlying islands of Toba. Historically, it was noted for its Ama divers.

Remains of human settlement from the Jōmon, Yayoi, and Kofun periods have been found on Sugashima, and the name "Sugashima" appears in early documents, such as the Man'yōshū and Wamyō Ruijushō, and was mentioned in Kamakura period poetry by Saigyō Hōshi and Emperor Juntoku. The area prospered as a fishing village, and transshipment point for the Toba Domain under the Tokugawa shogunate in the Edo period. Following the Meiji restoration, Sugashima Lighthouse was built on the island in 1873, with its inauguration attended by Saigō Takamori and other leaders of the Meiji government. In 1919, the Sugashima Marine Biological Laboratory of Nagoya University was established on the island.

During the Meiji period, the island was made part of Tōshi District (答志郡), which became part of Shima District from 1896. On November 1, 1954, the island became part of the city of Toba.

The economy of the island is based on commercial fishing and tourism. A peridotite quarry on the island is also a major source of income.
