= Shiraki Station =

Railway station in Toba, Mie Prefecture, Japan

Shiraki Station 白木駅
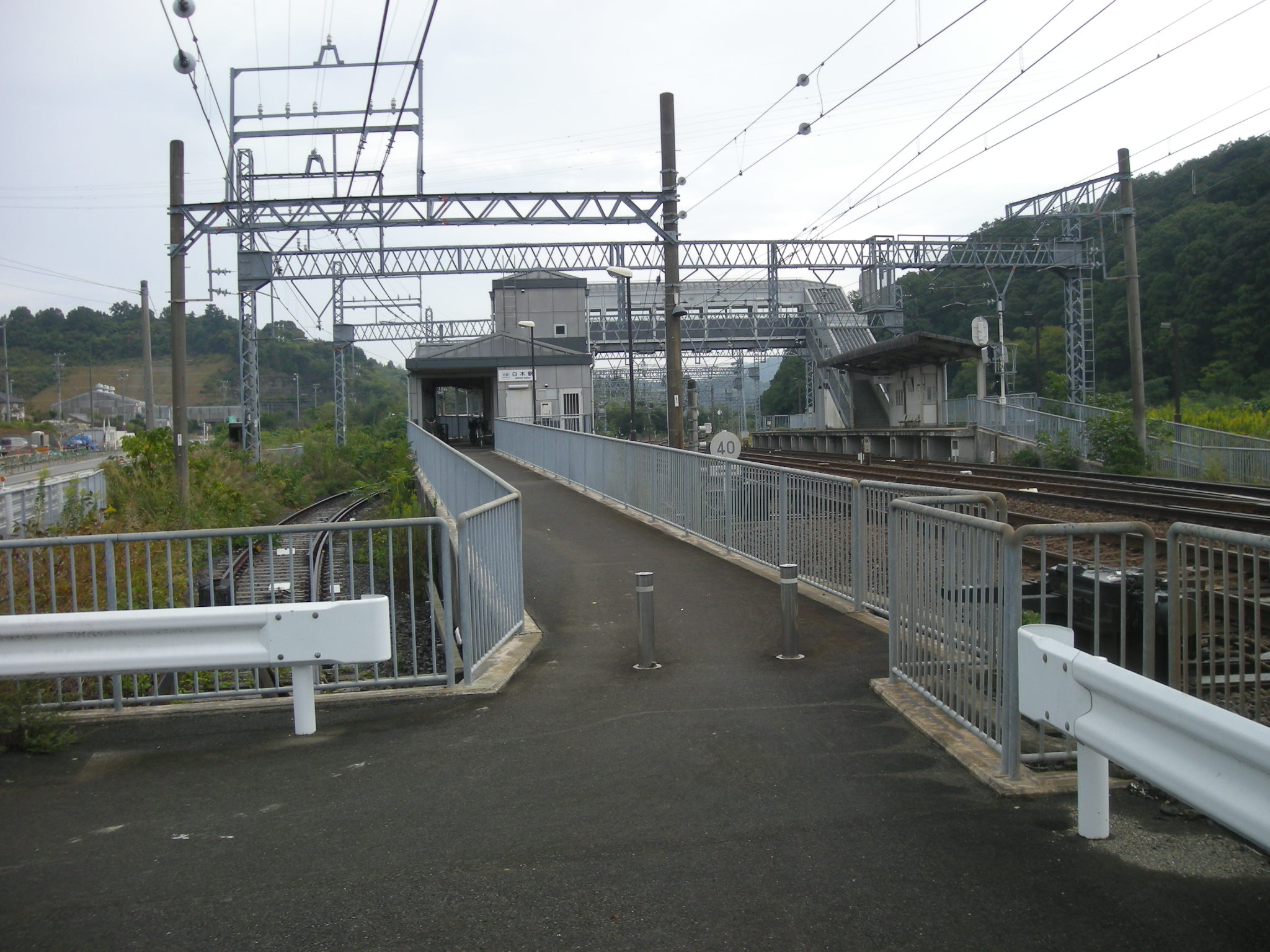
- Entrance (October 2008)

General information
- Location: Shiraki-cho Hosoda 62-2, Toba-shi, Mie-ken 517-0043; Japan
- Coordinates: 34.4290°N 136.8307°E
- Operator: Kintetsu Railway
- Line: Shima Line
- Distance: 49.4 km from Ise-Nakagawa
- Platforms: 2 side platforms
- Connections: Bus terminal

Other information
- Station code: M84
- Website: Official website

History
- Opened: July 23, 1929; 97 years ago

Passengers
- FY2019: 20 daily
Location
- Location within Mie Prefecture Location within Japan

Shiraki Station (白木駅, Shiraki-eki) is a passenger railway station in located in the city of Toba, Mie Prefecture, Japan, operated by the private railway operator Kintetsu Railway.

== Lines ==
Shiraki Station is served by the Shima Line, and is located 49.4 rail kilometers from the terminus of the line at Ise-Nakagawa Station.

== Station layout ==
The station was consists of two side platforms serving a refuge track each connected by a footbridge. Two passing tracks (Tracks 2 and 3) are located between the refuge tracks. The station is unattended.

=== Platforms ===
1	■ Shima Line	for Shima-Isobe and Kashikojima
4	■ Shima Line	for Toba

== Adjacent stations ==
«	Service	»
Shima Line
Matsuo	Local	Gochi

== History ==
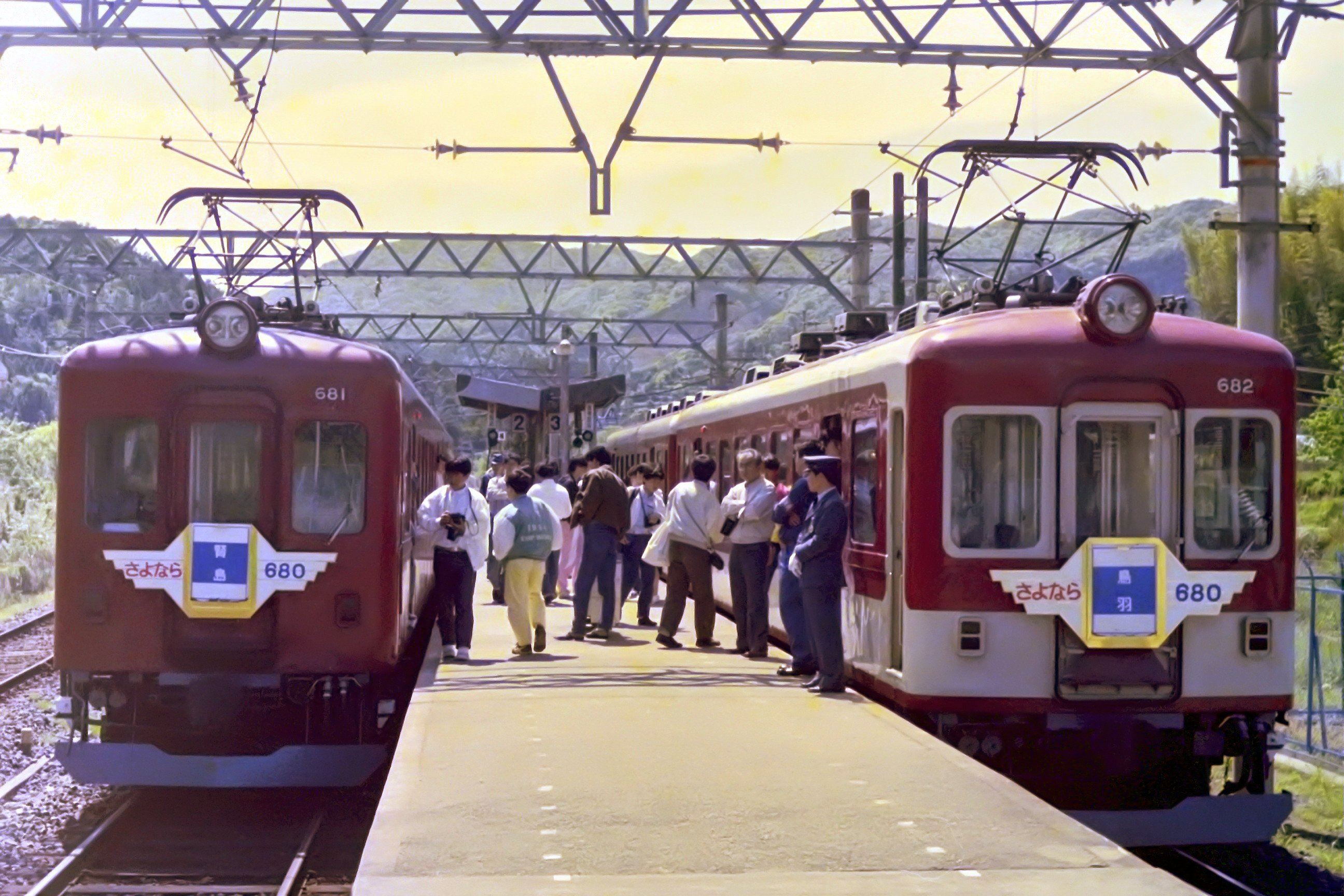
Single track era (May 4, 1987)

Shiraki Station opened on July 23, 1929 as a station on the Shima Electric Railway. The line was one of six private companies consolidated into Mie Kotsu by order of the Japanese government on February 11, 1944. When Mie Kotsu dissolved on February 1, 1964, the station became part of the Mie Electric Railway, which was then acquired by Kintetsu on April 1, 1965. The station has been unattended since February 2005.

== Passenger statistics ==
In fiscal 2019, the station was used by an average of 20 passengers daily (boarding passengers only).

== Surrounding area ==
- Japan National Route 167

== See also ==
- List of railway stations in Japan
