= Matsuo Station (Mie) =

Railway station in Toba, Mie Prefecture, Japan

Matsuo Station 松尾駅
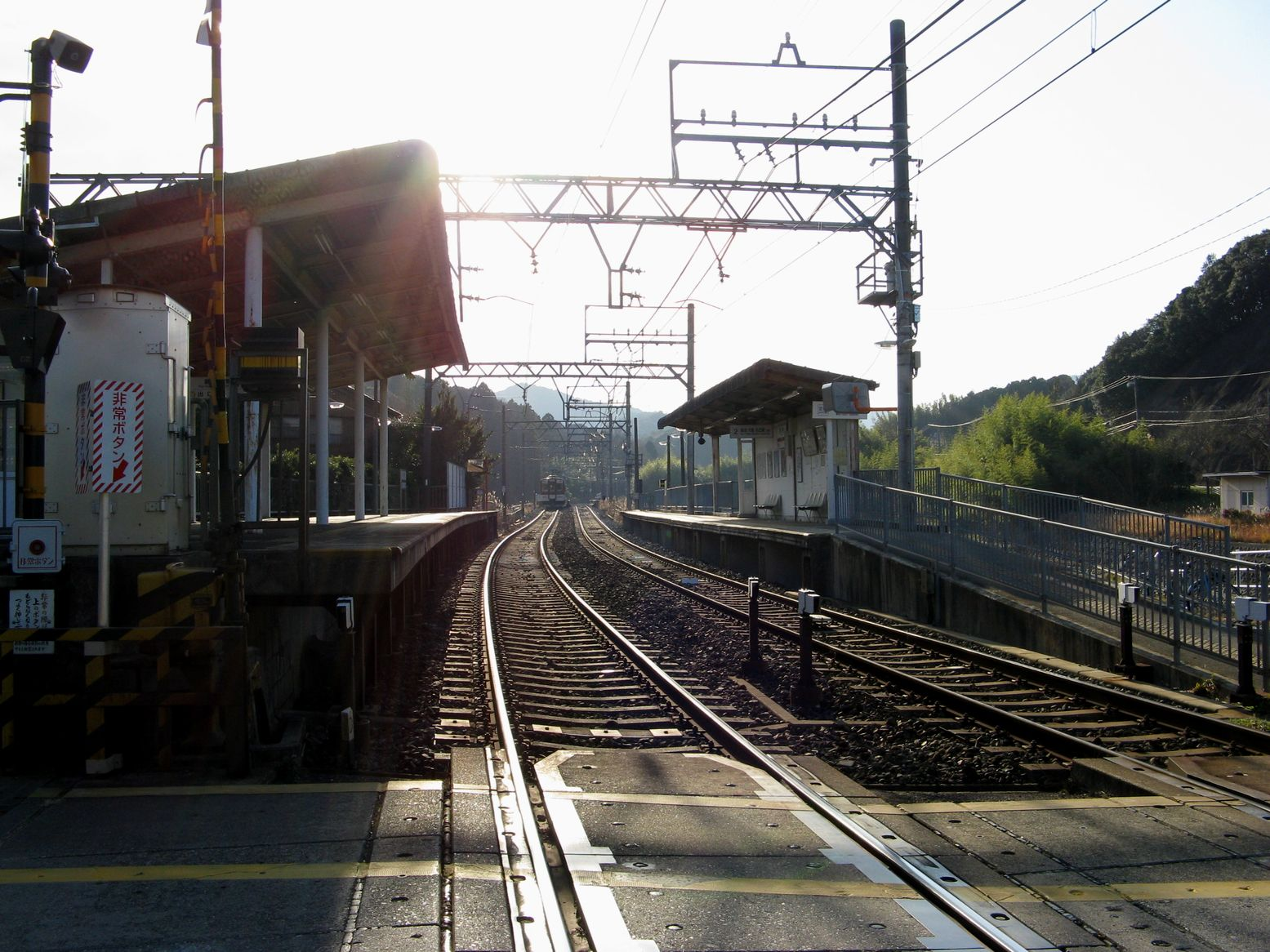
- Matsuo Station

General information
- Location: Matsuo-cho Minami 599-4, Toba-shi, Mie-ken 517-0042; Japan
- Coordinates: 34°25′58″N 136°50′25″E
- Operator: Kintetsu Railway
- Line: Shima Line
- Distance: 48.4 km from Ise-Nakagawa
- Platforms: 2 side platforms
- Connections: Bus terminal

Other information
- Station code: M83
- Website: Official website

History
- Opened: July 23, 1929; 97 years ago

Passengers
- FY2019: 87 daily
Location
- Location within Mie Prefecture Location within Japan

Matsuo Station (松尾駅, Matsuo-eki) is a passenger railway station in located in the city of Toba, Mie Prefecture, Japan, operated by the private railway operator Kintetsu Railway.

== Lines ==
Matsuo Station is served by the Shima Line, and is located 48.4 rail kilometers from the terminus of the line at Ise-Nakagawa Station.

== Station layout ==
The station was consists of two side platforms connected by a footbridge. There is no station building. The station is unattended.

1	■ Shima Line	for Shima-Isobe and Kashikojima
2	■ Shima Line	for Toba

== Adjacent stations ==
«	Service	»
Shima Line
Kamo	Local	Shiraki

== History ==
Matsuo Station opened on July 23, 1929 as a station on the Shima Electric Railway. The line was one of six private companies consolidated into Mie Kotsu by order of the Japanese government on February 11, 1944. When Mie Kotsu dissolved on February 1, 1964, the station became part of the Mie Electric Railway, which was then acquired by Kintetsu on April 1, 1965.

== Passenger statistics ==
In fiscal 2019, the station was used by an average of 87 passengers daily (boarding passengers only).

== Surrounding area ==
- Japan National Route 167
- Matsuo Industrial Park

== See also ==
- List of railway stations in Japan
