= Kutsukake Station =

Railway station in Shima, Mie Prefecture, Japan

Kutsukake Station 沓掛駅
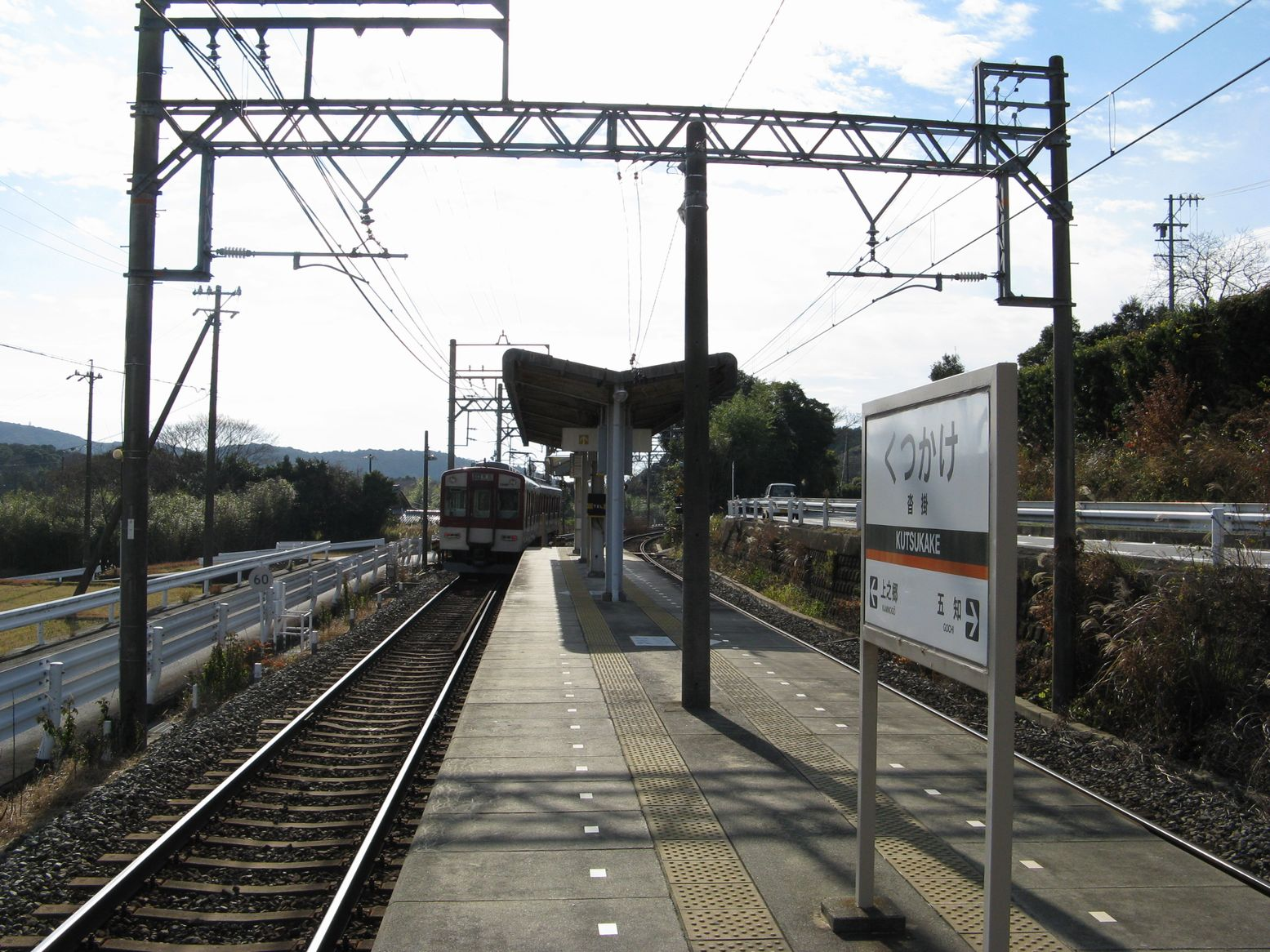
- Kutsukake Station (2006)

General information
- Location: Isobe-cho Kutsukake 72, Shima-shi, Mie-ken 517-0202; Japan
- Coordinates: 34.3942°N 136.8142°E
- Operator: Kintetsu Railway
- Line: Shima Line
- Distance: 54.2 km from Ise-Nakagawa
- Platforms: 1 island platform
- Connections: Bus terminal

Other information
- Station code: M86
- Website: Official website

History
- Opened: July 23, 1929; 97 years ago

Passengers
- FY2019: 12 daily
Location
- Location within Mie Prefecture Location within Japan

Kutsukake Station (沓掛駅, Kutsukake-eki) is a passenger railway station located in the city of Shima, Mie Prefecture, Japan, operated by the private railway operator Kintetsu Railway.

== Lines ==
Kutsukake Station is served by the Shima Line, and is located 54.2 rail kilometers from the terminus of the line at Ise-Nakagawa Station.

== Station layout ==
The station was consists of one island platform, connected to the road by a level crossing. There is no station building, but only a shelter on the platform. The station is unattended.

=== Platforms ===
1	■ Shima Line	for Shima-Isobe and Kashikojima
2	■ Shima Line	for Toba

== Adjacent stations ==
«	Service	»
Shima Line
Gochi	Local	Kaminogō

== History ==
Kutsukake Station opened on July 23, 1929 as a station on the Shima Electric Railway. The line was one of six private companies consolidated into Mie Kotsu by order of the Japanese government on February 11, 1944. When Mie Kotsu dissolved on February 1, 1964, the station became part of the Mie Electric Railway, which was then acquired by Kintetsu on April 1, 1965.

== Passenger statistics ==
In fiscal 2019, the station was used by an average of 12 passengers daily (boarding passengers only).

== Surrounding area ==
- National Route 167
- Ankoku-ji Temple

== See also ==
- List of railway stations in Japan
