= Gochi Station =

Railway station in Shima, Mie Prefecture, Japan

Gochi Station 五知駅
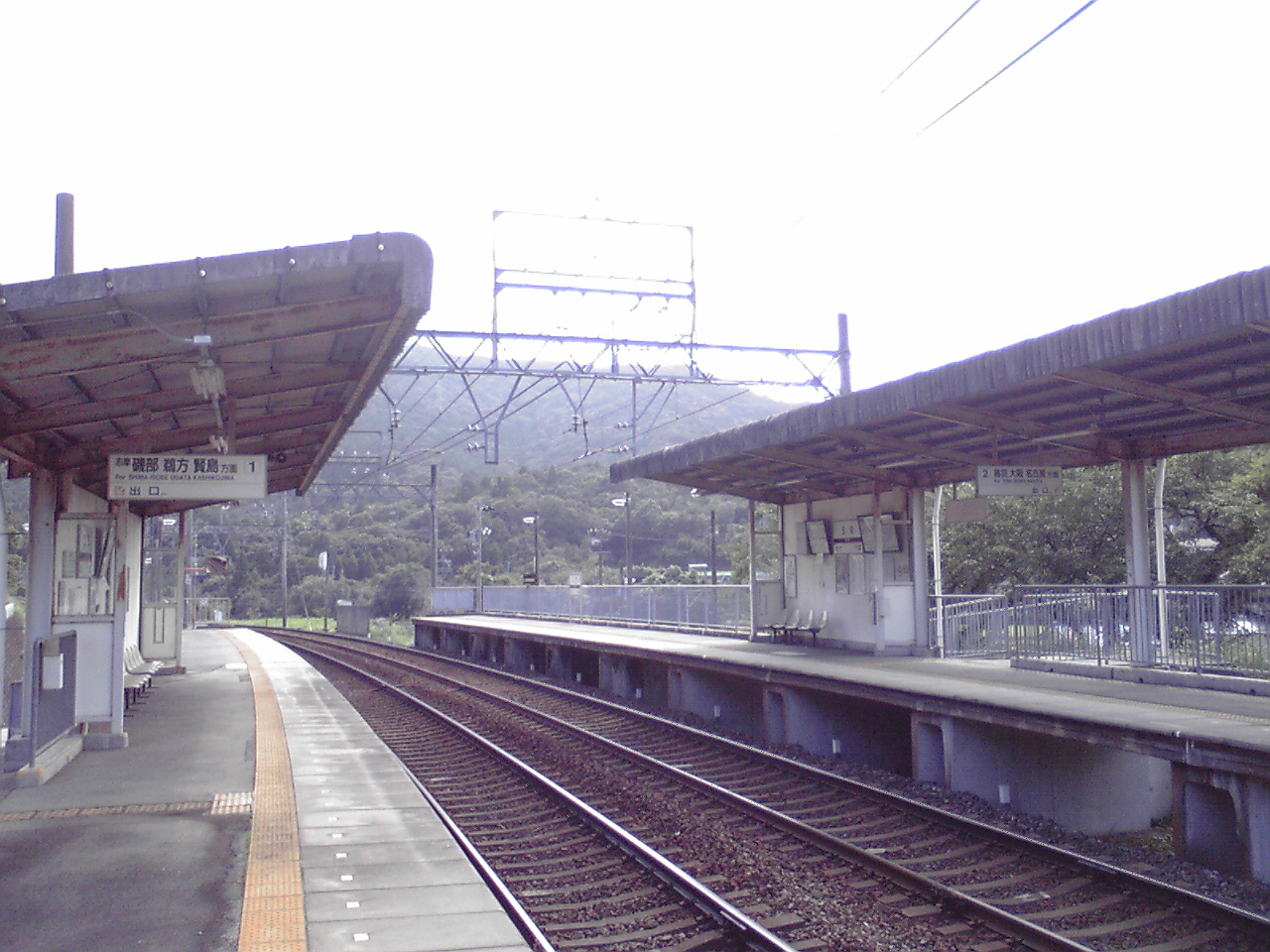
- Gochi Station (2009)

General information
- Location: Isobe-cho Gochi 46-9, Shima-shi, Mie-ken 517-0201; Japan
- Coordinates: 34.4071°N 136.8107°E
- Operator: Kintetsu Railway
- Line: Shima Line
- Distance: 52.5 km from Ise-Nakagawa
- Platforms: 2 side platforms
- Connections: Bus terminal

Other information
- Station code: M85
- Website: Official website

History
- Opened: July 23, 1929; 97 years ago

Passengers
- FY2019: 13 daily
Location
- Location within Mie Prefecture Location within Japan

Gochi Station (五知駅, Gochi-eki) is a passenger railway station in located in the city of Shima, Mie Prefecture, Japan, operated by the private railway operator Kintetsu Railway.

== Lines ==
Gochi Station is served by the Shima Line, and is located 52.5 rail kilometers from the terminus of the line at Ise-Nakagawa Station.

== Station layout ==
The station consists of two opposed side platforms located on an embankment, connected by an underground passage. The station is unattended.

=== Platforms ===
1	■ Shima Line	for Shima-Isobe and Kashikojima
2	■ Shima Line	for Toba

== Adjacent stations ==
«	Service	»
Shima Line
Shiraki	Local	Kutsukake

== History ==
Gochi Station opened on July 23, 1929 as a station on the Shima Electric Railway. The line was one of six private companies consolidated into Mie Kotsu by order of the Japanese government on February 11, 1944. When Mie Kotsu dissolved on February 1, 1964, the station became part of the Mie Electric Railway, which was then acquired by Kintetsu on April 1, 1965.

== Passenger statistics ==
In fiscal 2019, the station was used by an average of 13 passengers daily (boarding passengers only).

== Surrounding area ==
- National Route 167

== See also ==
- List of railway stations in Japan
