= Kamo Station (Mie) =

Railway station in Toba, Mie Prefecture, Japan

Kamo Station 加茂駅
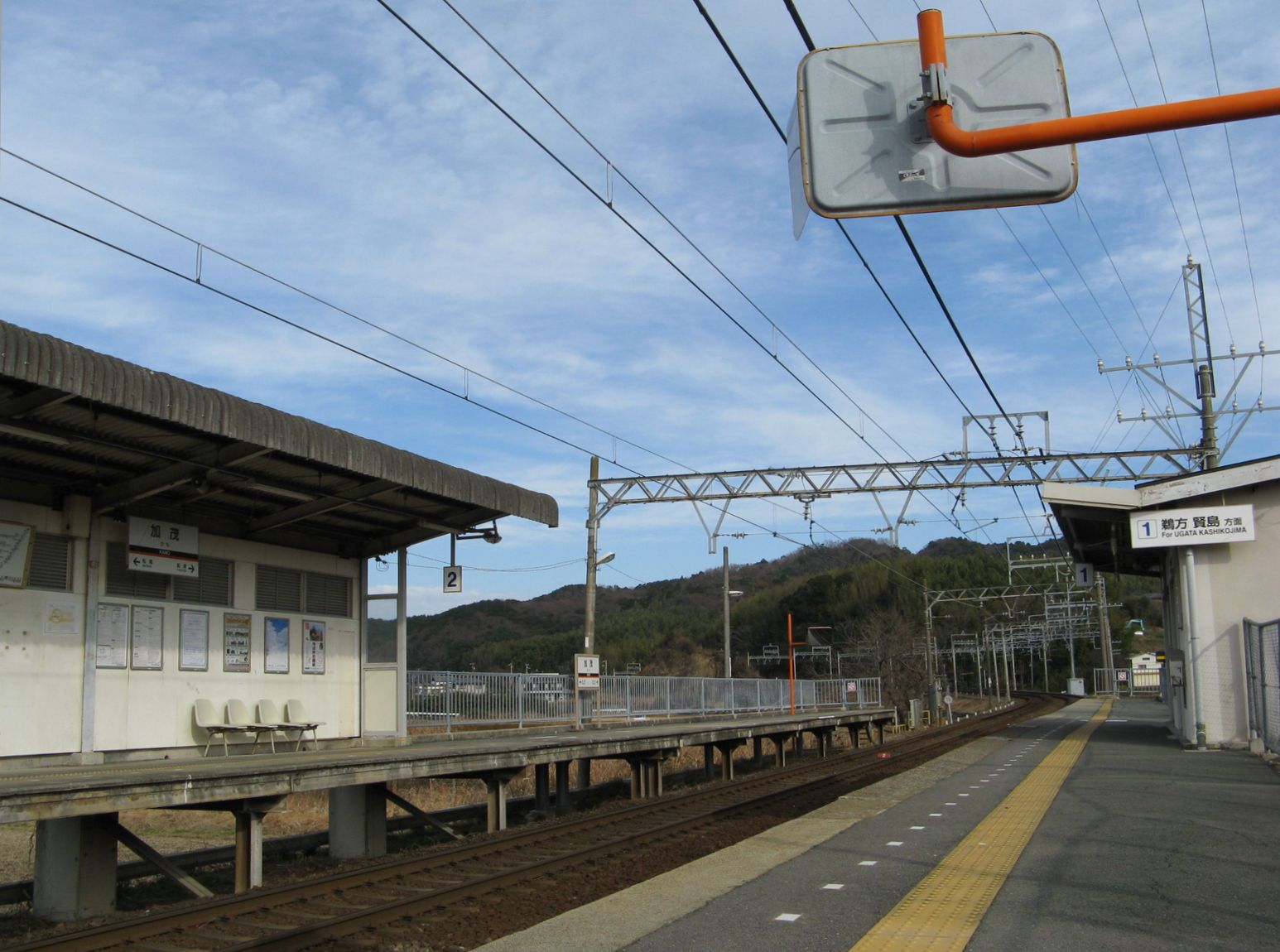
- Kamo Station

General information
- Location: Iwakura-cho Ono 470-3, Toba-shi, Mie-ken 517-0041; Japan
- Coordinates: 34°26′39″N 136°50′48″E
- Operator: Kintetsu Railway
- Line: Shima Line
- Distance: 47.0 km from Ise-Nakagawa
- Platforms: 2 side platforms
- Connections: Bus terminal

Other information
- Station code: M82
- Website: Official website

History
- Opened: July 23, 1929; 97 years ago

Passengers
- FY2019: 102 daily
Location
- Location within Mie Prefecture Location within Japan

Kamo Station (加茂駅, Kamo-eki) is a passenger railway station in located in the city of Toba, Mie Prefecture, Japan, operated by the private railway operator Kintetsu Railway.

== Lines ==
Kamo Station is served by the Shima Line, and is located 47.0 rail kilometers from the terminus of the line at Ise-Nakagawa Station.

== Station layout ==
The station was consists of two opposed side platforms connected by a footbridge. The station is unattended.

=== Platforms ===
| 1 | ■ Shima Line | for Shima-Isobe and Kashikojima |
| 2 | ■ Shima Line | for Toba |

== Adjacent stations ==
| « | Service | » |
Shima Line
| Funatsu | Local | Matsuo |

== History ==
Kamo Station opened on July 23, 1929 as a station on the Shima Electric Railway. The line was one of six private companies consolidated into Mie Kotsu by order of the Japanese government on February 11, 1944. When Mie Kotsu dissolved on February 1, 1964, the station became part of the Mie Electric Railway, which was then acquired by Kintetsu on April 1, 1965.

== Passenger statistics ==
In fiscal 2019, the station was used by an average of 102 passengers daily (boarding passengers only).

== Surrounding area ==
- Toba City Kamo Elementary School
- Toba City Kamo Junior High School

== See also ==
- List of railway stations in Japan
