= Funatsu Station (Toba) =

Railway station in Toba, Mie Prefecture, Japan

Funatsu Station 船津駅
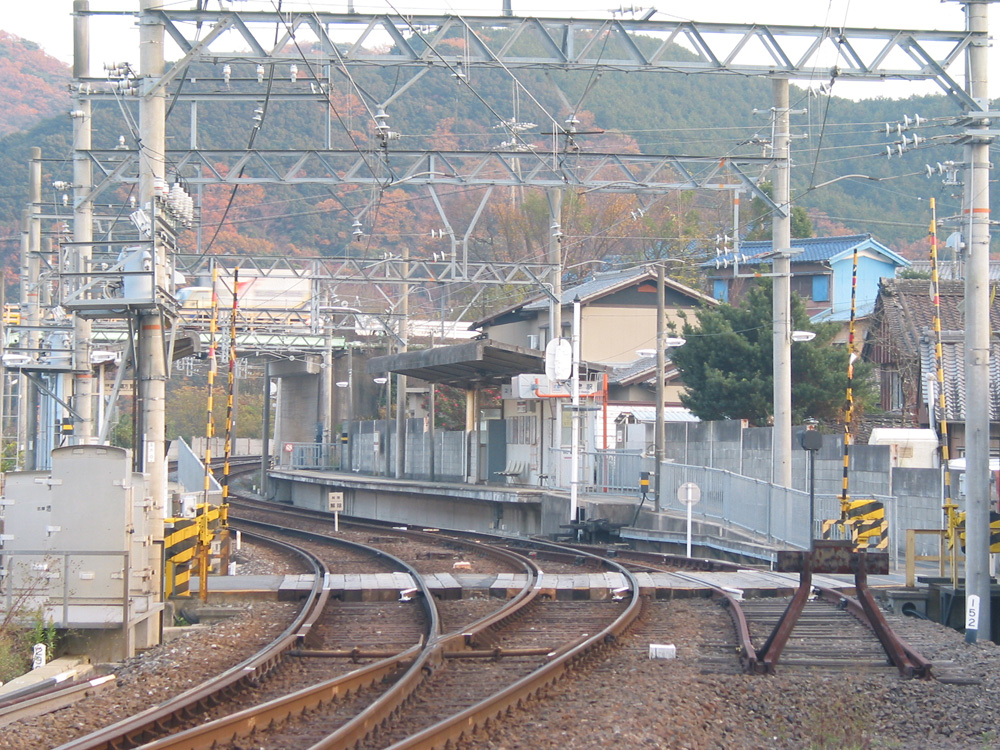
- Funatsu Station

General information
- Location: Funatsu-cho Hama 1025-6, Toba-shi, Mie-ken 519-3403; Japan
- Coordinates: 34°27′25″N 136°50′30″E
- Operator: Kintetsu Railway
- Line: Shima Line
- Distance: 45.4 km from Ise-Nakagawa
- Platforms: 2 side platforms
- Connections: Bus terminal

Other information
- Station code: M81
- Website: Official website

History
- Opened: July 23, 1929; 97 years ago

Passengers
- FY2019: 128 daily
Location
- Location within Mie Prefecture Location within Japan

Funatsu Station (船津駅, Funatsu-eki) is a passenger railway station located in the city of Toba, Mie Prefecture, Japan, operated by the private railway operator Kintetsu Railway.

== Lines ==
Funatsu Station is served by the Shima Line, and is located 45.4 rail kilometers from the terminus of the line at Ise-Nakagawa Station.

== Station layout ==
The station was consists of two opposed side platforms connected by a level crossing. The station is unattended.

=== Platforms ===
1	■ Shima Line	for Shima-Isobe and Kashikojima
2	■ Shima Line	for Toba

== Adjacent stations ==
«	Service	»
Shima Line
Shima-Akasaki	Local	Kamo

== History ==
Funatsu Station opened on July 23, 1929 as a station on the Shima Electric Railway. The line was one of six private companies consolidated into Mie Kotsu by order of the Japanese government on February 11, 1944. When Mie Kotsu dissolved on February 1, 1964, the station became part of the Mie Electric Railway, which was then acquired by Kintetsu on April 1, 1965.

== Passenger statistics ==
In fiscal 2019, the station was used by an average of 128 passengers daily (boarding passengers only).

== Surrounding area ==
- Kamo River

== See also ==
- List of railway stations in Japan
