= Kaminogō Station =

Railway station in Shima, Mie Prefecture, Japan

Kaminogō Station 上之郷駅
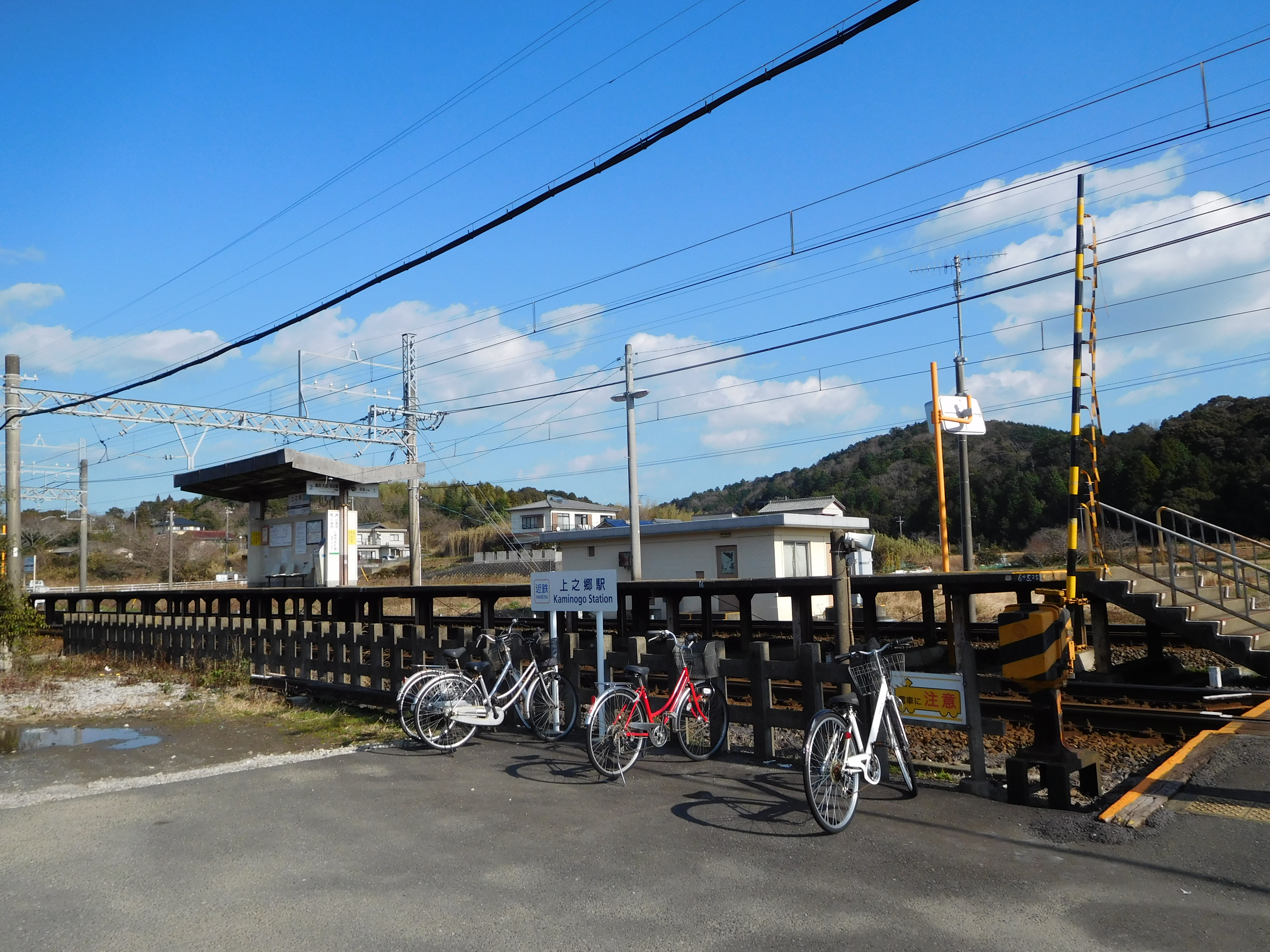
- Kaminogō Station, 2017

General information
- Location: Isobe-cho Kaminogō 24, Shima-shi, Mie-ken 517-0208; Japan
- Coordinates: 34.3796°N 136.8113°E
- Operator: Kintetsu Railway
- Line: Shima Line
- Distance: 56.1 km from Ise-Nakagawa
- Platforms: 1 island platform
- Connections: Bus terminal

Other information
- Station code: M87
- Website: Official website

History
- Opened: July 23, 1929; 97 years ago
- Former names: Shima-Isobe (until 1970)

Passengers
- FY2019: 47 daily
Location
- Location within Mie Prefecture Location within Japan

Kaminogō Station (上之郷駅, Kaminogō-eki) is a passenger railway station in located in the city of Shima, Mie Prefecture, Japan, operated by the private railway operator Kintetsu Railway.

== Lines ==
Kaminogō Station is served by the Shima Line, and is located 56.1 rail kilometers from the terminus of the line at Ise-Nakagawa Station.

== Station layout ==
The station consists of a single island platform with a level crossing. There is no station building, but only a small open shelter built directly on the platform. The station is unattended.

=== Platforms ===
1	■ Shima Line	for Shima-Isobe and Kashikojima
2	■ Shima Line	for Toba

== Adjacent stations ==
«	Service	»
Shima Line
Kutsukake	Local	Shima-Isobe

== History ==
Kaminogō Station opened on July 23, 1929 as Shima-Isobe Station (志摩磯部駅, Shima-Isobe eki) on the Shima Electric Railway. The line was one of six private companies consolidated into Mie Kotsu by order of the Japanese government on February 11, 1944. When Mie Kotsu dissolved on February 1, 1964, the station became part of the Mie Electric Railway, which was then acquired by Kintetsu on April 1, 1965. The station was renamed to its present name on March 1, 1970.

== Passenger statistics ==
In fiscal 2019, the station was used by an average of 47 passengers daily (boarding passengers only).

== Surrounding area ==
- National Route 167

== See also ==
- List of railway stations in Japan
