= Anagawa Station (Mie) =

Railway station in Shima, Mie Prefecture, Japan

Anagawa Station 穴川駅
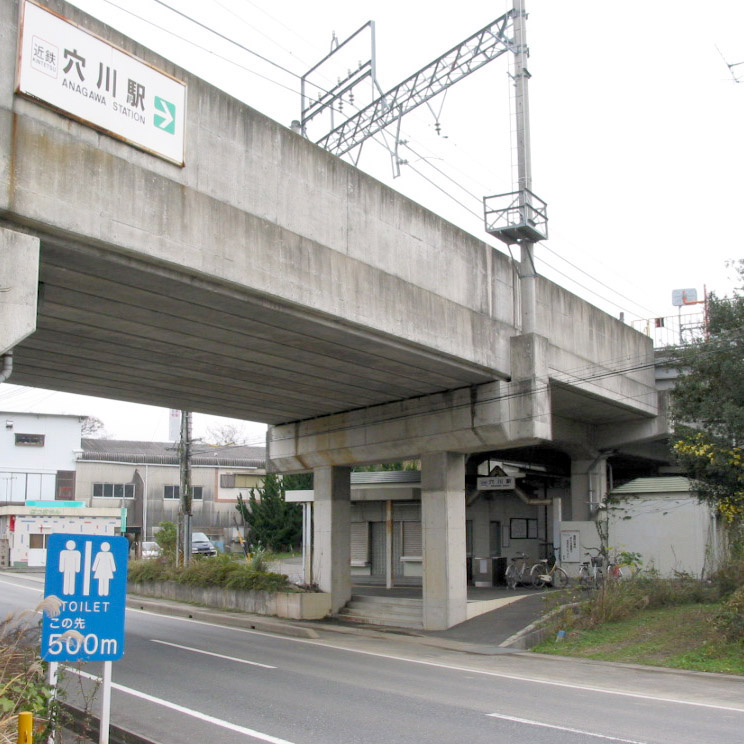
- Anagawa Station

General information
- Location: Isobe-cho Anagawa 1386-3, Shima-shi, Mie-ken; Japan
- Coordinates: 34°21′32″N 136°48′58″E
- Operator: Kintetsu Railway
- Line: Shima Line
- Distance: 59.1 km from Ise-Nakagawa
- Platforms: 2 side platforms
- Connections: Bus terminal

Other information
- Station code: M89
- Website: Official website

History
- Opened: July 23, 1929; 97 years ago

Passengers
- FY2019: 34 daily
Location
- Location within Mie Prefecture Location within Japan

Anagawa Station (穴川駅, Anagawa-eki) is a passenger railway station in located in the city of Shima, Mie Prefecture, Japan, operated by the private railway operator Kintetsu Railway.

== Lines ==
Anagawa Station is served by the Shima Line, and is located 59.1 rail kilometers from the terminus of the line at Ise-Nakagawa Station.

== Station layout ==
The station was consists of two elevated opposed side platforms, with the station building underneath. The station is unattended.

=== Platforms ===
| 1 | ■ Shima Line | for Ugata and Kashikojima |
| 2 | ■ Shima Line | for Toba |

== Adjacent stations ==
| « | Service | » |
Shima Line
| Shima-Isobe | Local | Shima-Yokoyama |

== History ==
Anagawa Station opened on July 23, 1929, as a station on the Shima Electric Railway. The line was one of six private companies consolidated into Mie Kotsu by order of the Japanese government on February 11, 1944. When Mie Kotsu dissolved on February 1, 1964, the station became part of the Mie Electric Railway, which was then acquired by Kintetsu on April 1, 1965. The station was reopened on March 1, 1970. Kintetsu moved the station to the current site on the elevated dual-track section on June 1, 1993.

== Passenger statistics ==
In fiscal 2019, the station was used by an average of 34 passengers daily (boarding passengers only).

== Surrounding area ==
- Yuu-Store department store

== See also ==
- List of railway stations in Japan
