= Shima-Akasaki Station =

Railway station in Toba, Mie Prefecture, Japan

Shima-Akasaki Station 志摩赤崎駅
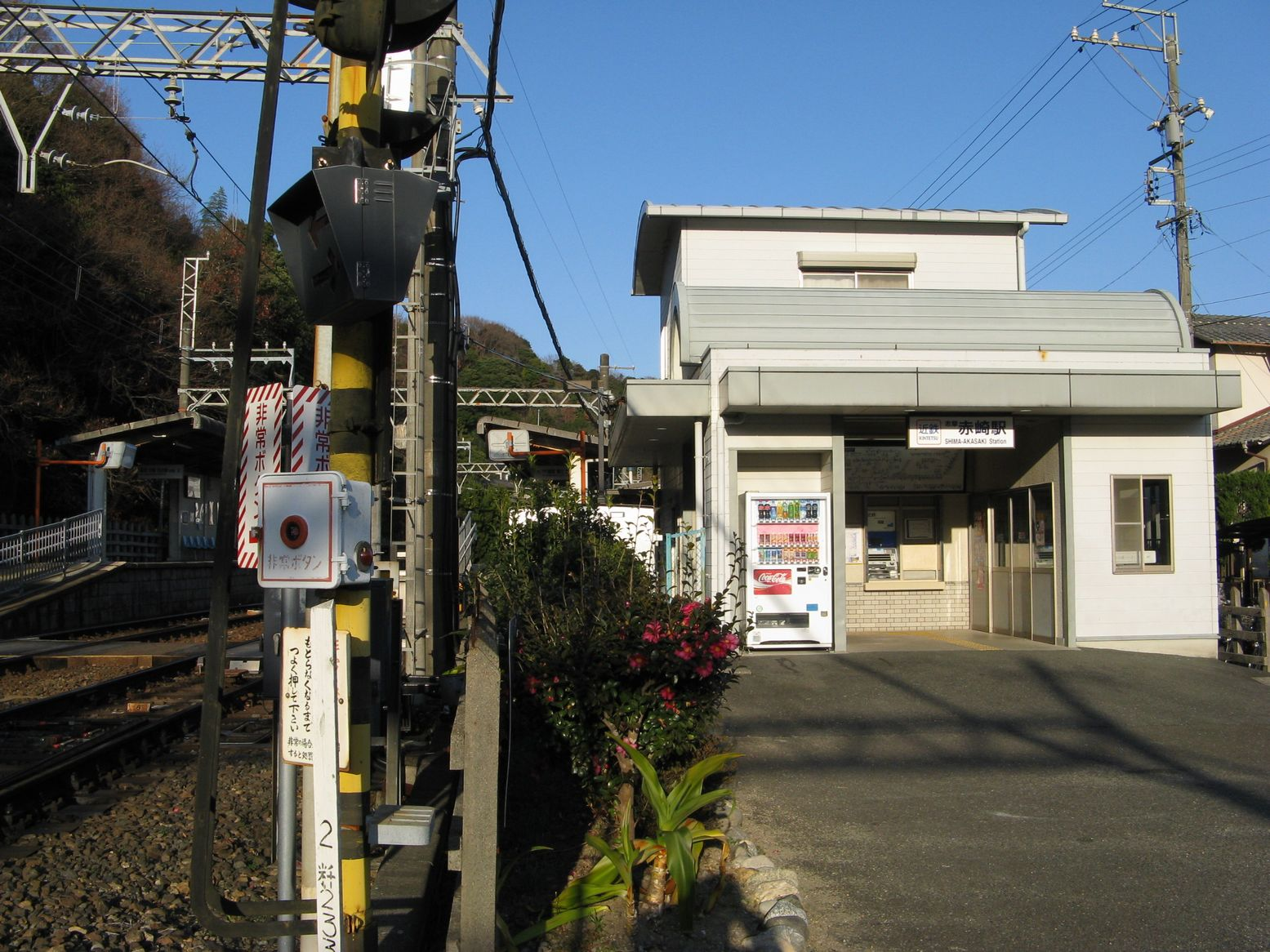
- Shima-Akasaki Station

General information
- Location: 4-27 Toba 5-chome, Toba-shi, Mie-ken 517-0011; Japan
- Coordinates: 34.4698°N 136.8419°E
- Operator: Kintetsu Railway
- Line: Shima Line
- Distance: 45.4 km from Ise-Nakagawa
- Platforms: 2 side platforms
- Connections: Bus terminal

Other information
- Station code: M81
- Website: Official website

History
- Opened: July 25, 1949; 77 years ago

Passengers
- FY2019: 232 daily
Location
- Location within Mie Prefecture Location within Japan

Shima-Akasaki Station (志摩赤崎駅, Shima-Akasaki-eki) is a passenger railway station in located in the city of Toba, Mie Prefecture, Japan, operated by the private railway operator Kintetsu Railway.

== Lines ==
Shima-Akasaki Station is served by the Shima Line, and is located 43.8 rail kilometers from the terminus of the line at Ise-Nakagawa Station.

== Station layout ==
The station was consists of two opposed side platforms connected by a footbridge. The station is unattended.

=== Platforms ===
1	■ Shima Line	for Shima-Isobe , Kashikojima
2	■ Shima Line	for Toba Ise-Nakagawa

== Adjacent stations ==
«	Service	»
Shima Line
Nakanogō	Local	Funatsu

== History ==
Shima-Akasaki Station opened on July 25, 1949 as a station on Mie Kotsu. When Mie Kotsu dissolved on February 1, 1964, the station became part of the Mie Electric Railway, which was then acquired by Kintetsu on April 1, 1965. The station building was reconstructed in 1969 and has used PiTaPa automated wicket gates since 2007. The station has been unattended since 2011.

== Passenger statistics ==
In fiscal 2019, the station was used by an average of 232 passengers daily (boarding passengers only).

== Surrounding area ==
- Toba High School
- Toba Police Station
- Toba Fire Station
- Jusco department store

== See also ==
- List of railway stations in Japan
