= Nakanogō Station =

Railway station in Toba, Mie Prefecture, Japan

Nakanogō Station 中之郷駅
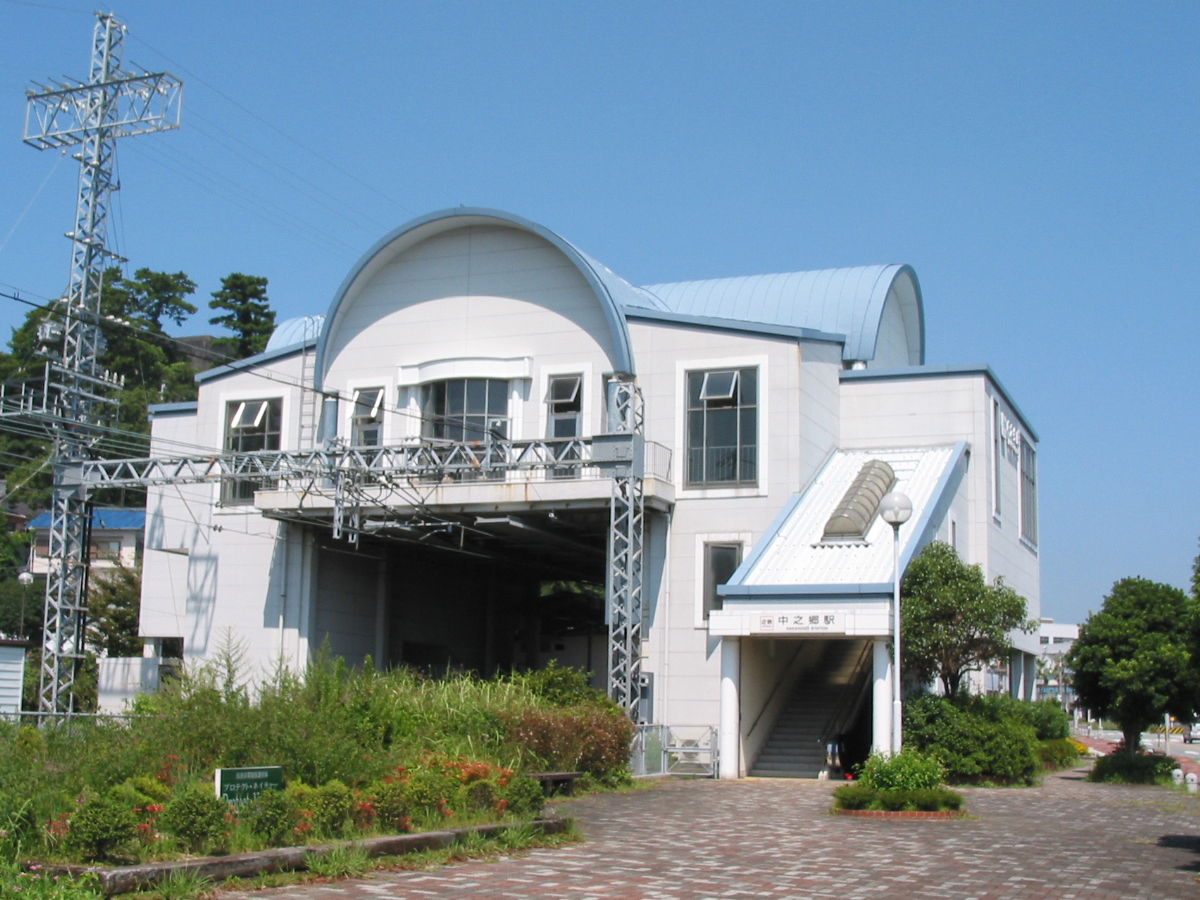
- Nakanogō Station

General information
- Location: 1484-107 Toba 3-chome, Toba-shi, Mie-ken 517-0011; Japan
- Coordinates: 34.4789°N 136.8455°E
- Operator: Kintetsu Railway
- Line: Shima Line
- Distance: 42.5 km from Ise-Nakagawa
- Platforms: 2 side platforms
- Connections: Bus terminal

Other information
- Station code: M79
- Website: Official website

History
- Opened: July 23, 1929; 97 years ago

Passengers
- FY2019: 193 daily
Location
- Location within Mie Prefecture Location within Japan

Nakanogō Station (中之郷駅, Nakanogō-eki) is a passenger railway station in located in the city of Toba, Mie Prefecture, Japan, operated by the private railway operator Kintetsu Railway.

== Lines ==
Nakanogō Station is served by the Shima Line, and is located 42.5 rail kilometers from the terminus of the line at Ise-Nakagawa Station.

== Station layout ==
The station was consists of two opposed side platforms connected by a level crossing. The station is unattended.

=== Platforms ===
1	■ Shima Line	for Shima-Isobe and Kashikojima
2	■ Shima Line	for Toba and Ise-Nakagawa

== Adjacent stations ==
«	Service	»
Shima Line
Toba	Local	Shima-Akasaki

== History ==
Nakanogō Station opened on July 23, 1929, as a station on the Shima Electric Railway. The line was one of six private companies consolidated into Mie Kotsu by order of the Japanese government on February 11, 1944. When Mie Kotsu dissolved on February 1, 1964, the station became part of the Mie Electric Railway, which was then acquired by Kintetsu on April 1, 1965. The station building was reconstructed in 1969 and has used PiTaPa automated wicket gates since 2007. The station has been unattended since 2011.

== Passenger statistics ==
In fiscal 2019, the station was used by an average of 193 passengers daily (boarding passengers only).

== Surrounding area ==
- Toba City Hall
- Toba Aquarium
- Ise-wan Ferry

== See also ==
- List of railway stations in Japan
