= Shima-Yokoyama Station =

Railway station in Shima, Mie Prefecture, Japan

Shima-Yokoyama Station 志摩横山駅
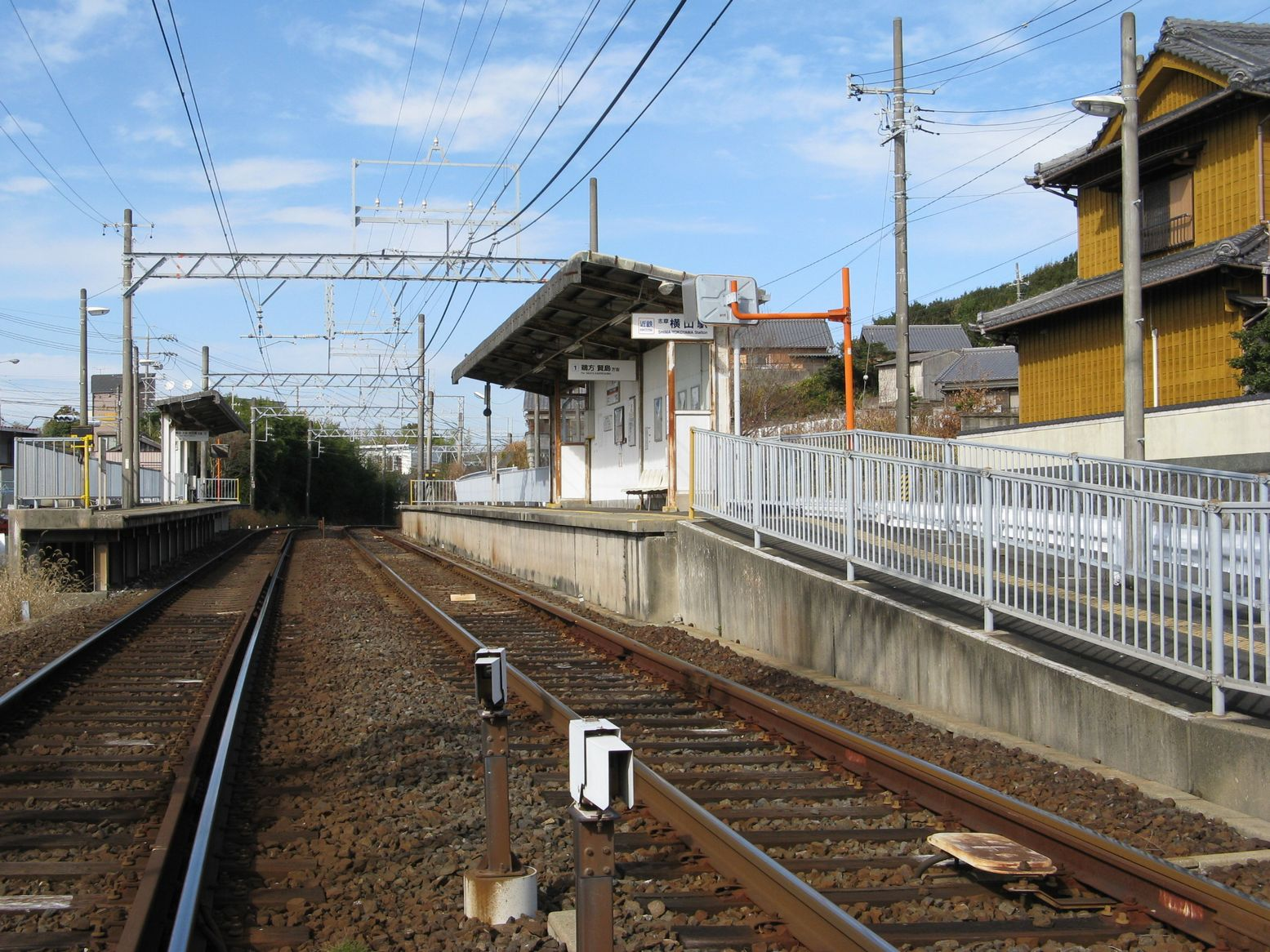
- Shima-Yokoyama Station

General information
- Location: Ago-cho Ugata 1243-4, Shima-shi, Mie-ken; Japan
- Coordinates: 34.3344°N 136.8182°E
- Operator: Kintetsu Railway
- Line: Shima Line
- Distance: 61.9 km from Ise-Nakagawa
- Platforms: 2 side platforms
- Connections: Bus terminal

Other information
- Station code: M90
- Website: Official website

History
- Opened: July 23, 1929; 97 years ago
- Former names: Ugataguchi (until 1946)

Passengers
- FY2019: 43 daily
Location
- Location within Mie Prefecture Location within Japan

Shima-Yokoyama Station (志摩横山駅, Shima-Yokoyama-eki) is a passenger railway station in located in the city of Shima, Mie Prefecture, Japan, operated by the private railway operator Kintetsu Railway.

== Lines ==
Shima-Yokoyama Station is served by the Shima Line, and is located 61.9 rail kilometers from the terminus of the line at Ise-Nakagawa Station.

== Station layout ==
The station was consists of two opposed side platforms connected by a level crossing. There is no station building. The station is unattended.

=== Platforms ===
1	■ Shima Line	for Ugata and Kashikojima
2	■ Shima Line	for Toba

== Adjacent stations ==
«	Service	»
Shima Line
Anagawa	Local	Ugata

== History ==
Shima-Yokoyama Station opened on July 23, 1929 as Ugataguchi Station (鵜方口駅, Ugataguchi-eki) on the Shima Electric Railway. The line was one of six private companies consolidated into Mie Kotsu by order of the Japanese government on February 11, 1944. The station was renamed to its present name in December 1946. When Mie Kotsu dissolved on February 1, 1964, the station became part of the Mie Electric Railway, which was then acquired by Kintetsu on April 1, 1965.

== Passenger statistics ==
In fiscal 2019, the station was used by an average of 43 passengers daily (boarding passengers only).

== Surrounding area ==
- Shima Hospital
- Mt. Yokoyama look-out point

== See also ==
- List of railway stations in Japan
