= Shima, Mie (town) =

Dissolved municipality in Mie prefecture, Japan

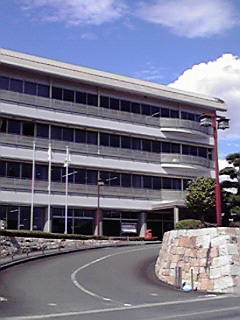
Shima town hall

Shima (志摩町, Shima-chō) was a town located in the former Shima District, Mie Prefecture, Japan.

As of 2003, the town had an estimated population of 14,075 and a density of 827.45 persons per km^{2}. The total area was 17.01 km^{2}.

On October 1, 2004, Shima absorbed the towns of Ago, Daiō, Hamajima and Isobe (all from Shima District) to create the city of Shima.
