= Japan National Route 260 =

Road in Mie prefecture, Japan

National Route 260
- 国道260号
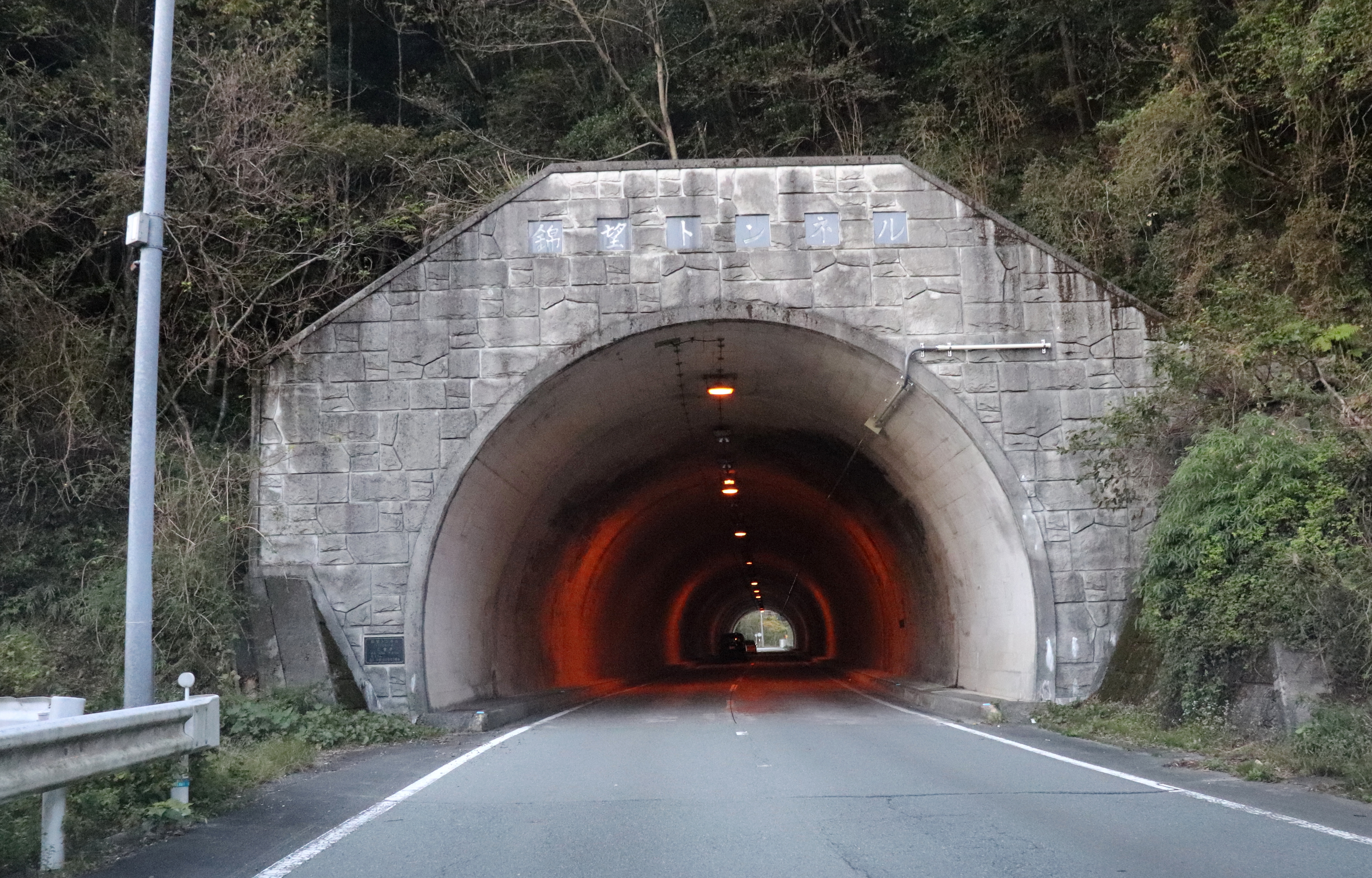
- Kinbo tunnel in Taiki

Route information
- Length: 115.5 km (71.8 mi)
- Existed: 1963–present

Major junctions
- East end: Shima
- West end: Kihoku

Location
- Country: Japan

Highway system
- National highways of Japan; Expressways of Japan
← National Route 259	→ National Route 261

National Route 260 (国道260号, Kokudō nihyaku-rokujū-gō) is a national highway connecting Shima, Mie and Kihoku, Mie in Japan.

== Route description ==
- Length: 115.5 km (72 mi)
- Origin: Shima (in front of Kashikojima Station)
- Terminus: Kihoku (at the crossing with Route 42)

== Passes through ==
Mie Prefecture

- Shima • Minami-Ise • Taiki • Kihoku

== Intersects with ==
Mie Prefecture

- Route 167
- Route 422
- Route 42
