= Shima-Shimmei Station =

Railway station in Shima, Mie Prefecture, Japan

Shima-Shimmei Station 志摩神明駅
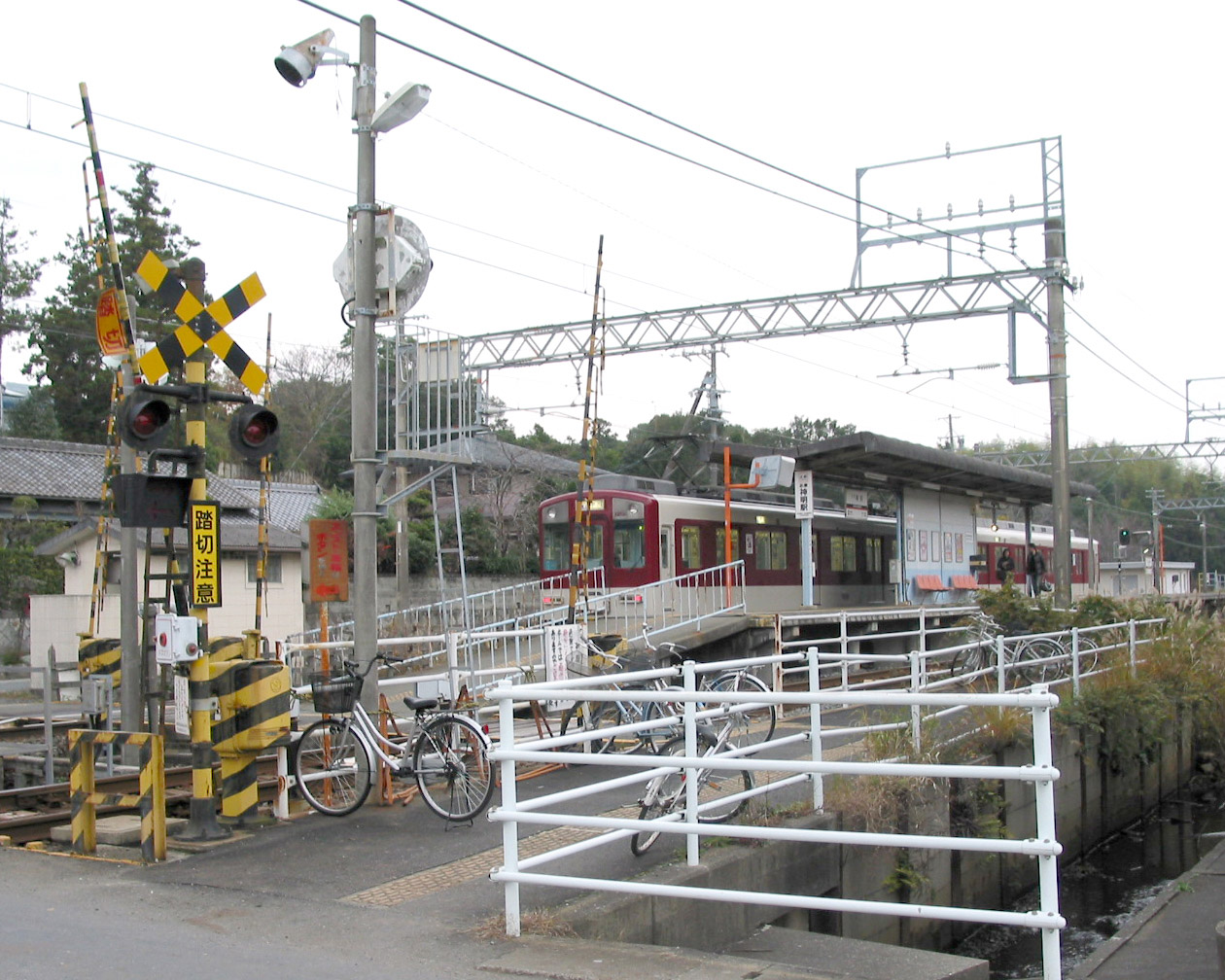
- Shima-Shimmei Station

General information
- Location: Shimmei 1158-3, Shima-shi, Mie-ken 517-0502; Japan
- Coordinates: 34.3161°N 136.8301°E
- Operator: Kintetsu Railway
- Line: Shima Line
- Distance: 64.4 km from Ise-Nakagawa
- Platforms: 1 island platform
- Connections: Bus terminal

Other information
- Station code: M92
- Website: Official website

History
- Opened: July 23, 1929; 97 years ago

Passengers
- FY2019: 123 daily
Location
- Location within Mie Prefecture Location within Japan

Shima-Shimmei Station (志摩神明駅, Shima-Shimmei-eki) is a passenger railway station in located in the city of Shima, Mie Prefecture, Japan, operated by the private railway operator Kintetsu Railway.

== Lines ==
Shima-Shimmei Station is served by the Shima Line, and is located 64.4 rail kilometers from the terminus of the line at Ise-Nakagawa Station.

== Station layout ==
The station consists of a single island platform. There is no station building, but only a rain shelter on the platform itself. The station is unattended.

=== Platforms ===
1	■ Shima Line	to Kashikojima
2	■ Shima Line	for Toba, Nagoya, Osaka Namba and Kyoto

== Adjacent stations ==
«	Service	»
Shima Line
Ugata	Local	Kashikojima

== History ==
Shima-Shimmei Station opened on July 23, 1929 as a station on the Shima Electric Railway. The line was one of six private companies consolidated into Mie Kotsu by order of the Japanese government on February 11, 1944. When Mie Kotsu dissolved on February 1, 1964, the station became part of the Mie Electric Railway, which was then acquired by Kintetsu on April 1, 1965.

== Passenger statistics ==
In fiscal 2019, the station was used by an average of 113 passengers daily (boarding passengers only).

== Surrounding area ==
- Shimmei shrine

== See also ==
- List of railway stations in Japan
