= Shima Line =

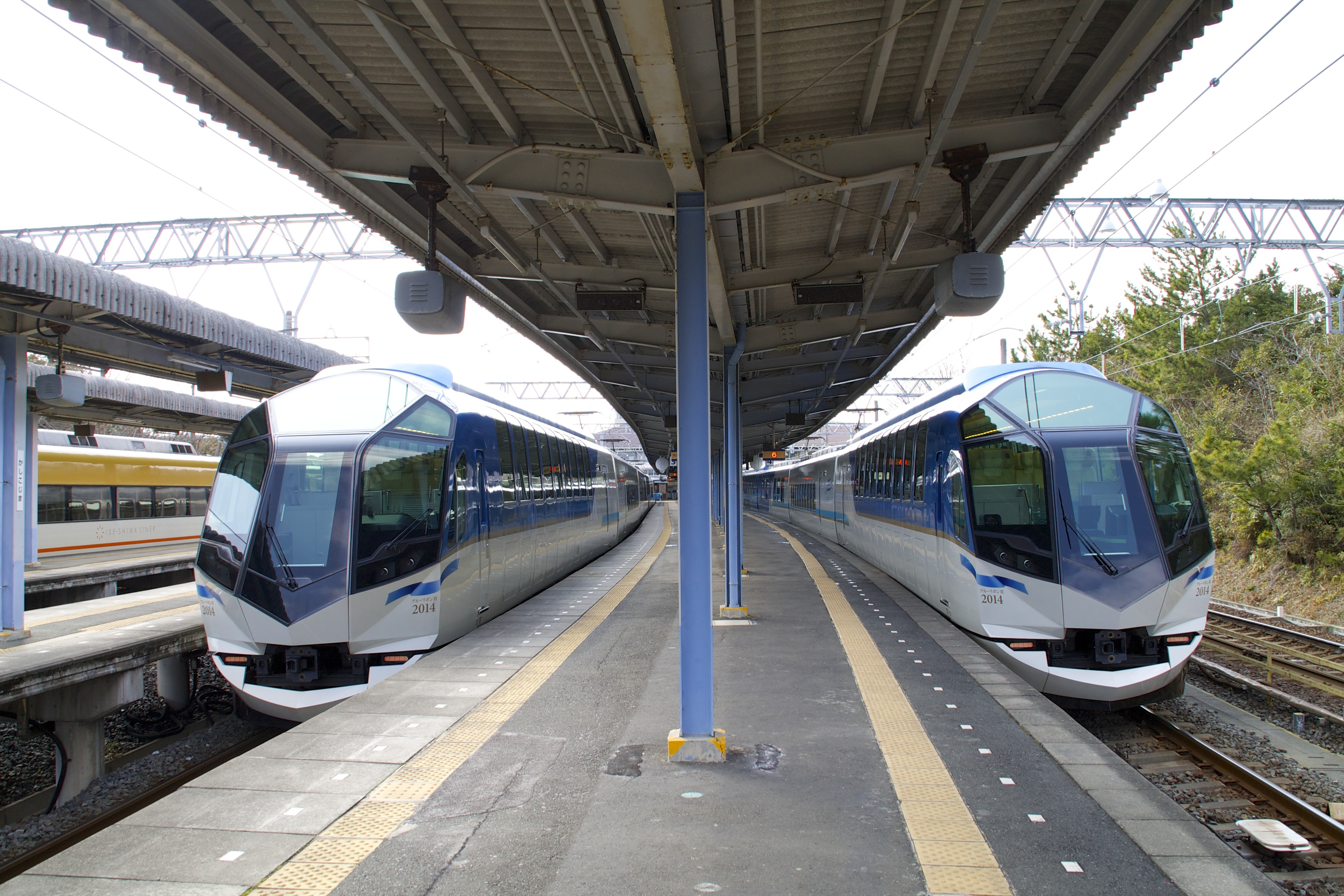
- Shimakaze Limited Expresses at the line terminus, Kashikojima Station

Overview
- Owner: Kintetsu Railway
- Line number: M
- Locale: Mie Prefecture
- Termini: Toba; Kashikojima
- Stations: 16
- Color on map: (#00b3c1)

Service
- Type: Commuter rail
- Operator(s): Kintetsu Railway

History
- Opened: 23 July 1929; 96 years ago

Technical
- Line length: 24.52 km (15.24 mi)
- Track gauge: 1,435 mm (4 ft 8 1/2 in) standard gauge
- Electrification: 1,500 V DC (overhead lines)
- Operating speed: 130 km/h (81 mph) (Limited Express); 90 km/h (56 mph) (Local)
- Signalling: Automatic closed block
- Train protection system: Kintetsu ATS

The Shima Line (志摩線, Shima-sen) is a railway line in Mie Prefecture, Japan, operated by private railway operator Kintetsu Railway, connecting Toba Station in Toba with Kashikojima Station in Shima.

The line connects with the Toba Line at Toba Station. The Yamada Line, Toba Line, and Shima Line form a single train line that begins at Ise-Nakagawa Station and serves the Ise-Shima tourist region.

== Service ==
LO Local (普通 futsū)

For Nakagawa
For Kashikojima
(Locals stop at every station.)

LE Limited Express (特急 tokkyū)

For Osaka Namba and Osaka Uehommachi; via Nabari and Yamato-Yagi (Kashihara)
For Kyoto; via Yamato-Saidaiji (Nara)
For Nagoya; via Tsu and Yokkaichi
For Kashikojima
(Seat reservations and limited express fee required.)

NS Non-stop Limited Express (ノンストップ特急 nonsutoppu tokkyū)

For Osaka Namba
For Nagoya
For Kashikojima
(Runs twice a day on weekends.)
(Seat reservations and limited express fee required.)

SV Premium Express Shimakaze (しまかぜ Shimakaze)

For Osaka Namba
For Kyoto
For Nagoya
For Kashikojima
(Train to and from Osaka runs once a day except on Tuesday with some exceptions.)
(Train to and from Kyoto runs once a day except on Wednesday with some exceptions.)
(Train to and from Nagoya runs once a day except on Thursday with some exceptions.)
(Seat reservations, limited express fee and "Shimakaze" special vehicle fee required.)

== Stations ==
Legend
●	Trains stop here
|	Trains do not stop here

No.	Station	Japanese	Distance (km)	Transfers	LO	LE	NS	SV	Location	
M78	Toba	鳥羽	0.0	Sangū Line; M Toba Line	●	●	●	●	Toba	Mie Prefecture
M79	Nakanogō	中之郷	1.0	Ise-wan Ferry	●	|	|	|	Toba	Mie Prefecture
M80	Shima-Akasaki	志摩赤崎	2.3		●	|	|	|	Toba	Mie Prefecture
M81	Funatsu	船津	3.9		●	|	|	|	Toba	Mie Prefecture
M82	Kamo	加茂	5.5		●	|	|	|	Toba	Mie Prefecture
M83	Matsuo	松尾	6.9		●	|	|	|	Toba	Mie Prefecture
M84	Shiraki	白木	7.9		●	|	|	|	Toba	Mie Prefecture
M85	Gochi	五知	11.0		●	|	|	|	Shima	Mie Prefecture
M86	Kutsukake	沓掛	12.7		●	|	|	|	Shima	Mie Prefecture
M87	Kaminogō	上之郷	14.6		●	|	|	|	Shima	Mie Prefecture
M88	Shima-Isobe	志摩磯部	16.0		●	●	●	|	Shima	Mie Prefecture
M89	Anagawa	穴川	17.6		●	|	|	|	Shima	Mie Prefecture
M90	Shima-Yokoyama	志摩横山	20.4		●	|	|	|	Shima	Mie Prefecture
M91	Ugata	鵜方	21.3		●	●	●	●	Shima	Mie Prefecture
M92	Shima-Shimmei	志摩神明	23.1		●	|	|	|	Shima	Mie Prefecture
M93	Kashikojima	賢島	24.5		●	●	●	●	Shima	Mie Prefecture

== History ==
During the Meiji era, travelers coming to modern-day Shima walked along the Ise-Isobe road, now known as Mie Route 32. In 1911, as the Meiji era neared its end, the government-owned Sangū Line (now owned by JR Central) was extended from the city of Ujiyamada (modern-day Ise) to Toba, making Toba the default origin of any railroad to Shima, and not Ujiyamada. During the 1910s, as the Taishō period began, many plans were put forth by various members of the railroad industry, but none were implemented.

=== Shima Electric Railway ===
In 1923, Shima Electric Railway (志摩電気鉄道, Shima Denki Tetsudō) was established by Kakuya Morimoto, and by 1924 the plan for a railroad to Shima was finally approved. This plan specified Toba Station as the origin, as well as a track gauge of 1,067 mm (3 ft 6 in), allowing the line to connect directly with the Sangū Line (also 1,067 mm) in Toba. The original plan also specified that Ugata Station would be the terminus. However, shortly before construction began, a request was made to members of an already-established railway company, Tokyu Corporation, to see if the plan drawn up by Shima Electric Railway was sound. In the end, the only recommendation made was that the terminus be extended from Ugata to a nearby uninhabited island in Ago Bay called Kashiko Island, citing the island's natural beauty as conducive to establishing a profitable resort and tourism industry catering to travelers and pilgrims already coming to the area to visit nearby Ise Grand Shrine. Executives at Shima Electric Railway incorporated this suggestion into their plan and decided the line would include two stations on Kashiko Island: Kashikojima Station for tourists, and Shinjukō Station (真珠港駅; lit: Pearl Port Station), the new terminus, for use as a freight station by the area's marine industry. However, the people living near Ugata, the original terminus, opposed the new plan because they felt having the line's endpoint in their area would bring economic benefit. This period of opposition lasted for four years, during which people living near Ugata refused to sell the land needed by Shima Electric Railway to lay track leading to Kashiko Island, thereby delaying construction. After an agreement was reached, the line was finally completed and opened in 1929, five years after the original plan had been drafted.

In 1944, Shima Electric Railway, along with six other companies, merged to form Mie Transport (Sanco). Twenty years later, the railway department of Sanco split off to become a separate company called Mie Electric Railway (Sanden), however this organization was short-lived as it was bought up by railway giant Kinki Nippon Railway (Kintetsu) the following year, and thus in 1965 the line came under its current name and ownership.

=== Kintetsu renovation ===
In acquiring the line, Kintetsu now had a problem because the Shima Line, which originated at Toba Station, was not connected with the rest of Kintetsu's extensive rail network which stretched only as far as Ujiyamada Station in Ise. Moreover, the railway gauge and voltage used on the Shima Line were different from the majority of Kintetsu lines, including the nearby Yamada Line which terminated at Ujiyamada. For the time being, Kintetsu offered bus service between Ujiyamada and Toba, but in the late 1960s they decided it was worthwhile to create a rail connection between the two in hopes of attracting customers from the upcoming 1970 World's Fair in Osaka by offering direct rail service to the area. This was the impetus for the construction of the Toba Line, and to make direct service possible between the Shima Line, the under-construction Toba Line, the Yamada Line, and beyond, the Shima Line was closed for four months in late 1969 and early 1970 to change the gauge to 1,435 mm (4 ft 8 1/2 in) and double the voltage to 1,500 V DC to match the other Kintetsu lines it would connect with. Other improvements were added such as the ATS system, a new switching network, and gentler curves. The renovated Shima Line and the newly built Toba Line opened together in March 1970, and Kintetsu began running limited express trains from Kintetsu Namba and Kintetsu Nagoya to Kashikojima just in time for the beginning of the World's Fair. The sharp increase of passengers on the line also motivated Kintetsu to invest money in a variety of tourism business enterprises in the Ise-Shima, especially along the Shima Line.

In 1986, it was decided that a second track on the Shima Line would assist in increasing the speed and number of trains on the line. Construction took several years and now most but not all of the line has dual tracks. The Aomine Tunnel between Shiraki and Gochi was also added to the line during this phase.

=== Timeline ===
- July 23, 1929 - Toba - Kashikojima - Shinjukō section opened by Shima Electric Railway.
- February 11, 1944 - Shima Electric Railway and six other companies merge to form Mie Transport (Sanco). Line officially renamed Sanco Shima Line.
- December 1, 1946 - Ugataguchi Station officially renamed to Shima-Yokoyama Station.
- July 25, 1949 - Shima-Akasaki Station opens.
- February 1, 1964 - Sanco railway division splits off and forms a new company Mie Electric Railway (Sanden). Line officially renamed Sanden Shima Line.
- April 1, 1965 - Sanden, and all of its lines, are acquired by Kintetsu. Line officially renamed Shima Line.
- July 1, 1969 - Freight service along the line ceases and Shinjukō Station closes. Kashikojima becomes endpoint.
- December 10, 1969 - Shima Line is closed and construction to make various improvements on the line begins.
- March 1, 1970 - Improvements are finished and the Shima Line reopens, now connected to the rest of the Kintetsu rail network. Shima-Isobe Station renamed Kaminogō; Hasama Station renamed Shima-Isobe. Direct service begins from both Osaka and Nagoya to Kashikojima begins.
- March 6, 1988 - Second track opens on Ugata to Shima-Shimmei section.
- December 8, 1990 - Second track opens on Shima-Shimmei to Kashikojima section.
- November 6, 1992 - Second track opens on Toba to Nakanogō section.
- December 22, 1992 - Second track opens on Funatsu to Kamo section.
- April 28, 1993 - Second track opens on Gochi to Kaminogō section.
- June 1, 1993 - Second track opens on Shima-Isobe to Ugata section.
- September 11, 1993 - Second track opens on Kamo to Gochi section. Aomine Tunnel completed.
- September 21, 1993 - Tracks re-routed through Aomine Tunnel on Shiraki to Gochi section. Total line length reduced by 0.7 km.
- May 30, 2001 - Wanman driver-only operation begins.
