= Shima District, Mie =

Former district in Mie prefecture, Japan

Shima (志摩郡, Shima-gun) was a district located in Mie Prefecture, Japan.

As of 2003, the district had an estimated population of 70,059 and a density of 334.35/km^{2} (866.0/sq mi). The total area was 179.63 km^{2} (69.36 sq mi).

== Towns and villages ==
- Ago
- Daiō
- Hamajima
- Isobe
- Shima

== Mergers ==
- On October 1, 2004 - The former town of Shima absorbed the towns of Ago, Daiō, Hamajima and Isobe to create the city of Shima, effectively turning the district into a city. Therefore, Shima District was dissolved as a result of this merger.
