= Japan National Route 259 =

National highway in Japan

National Route 259
- 国道259号
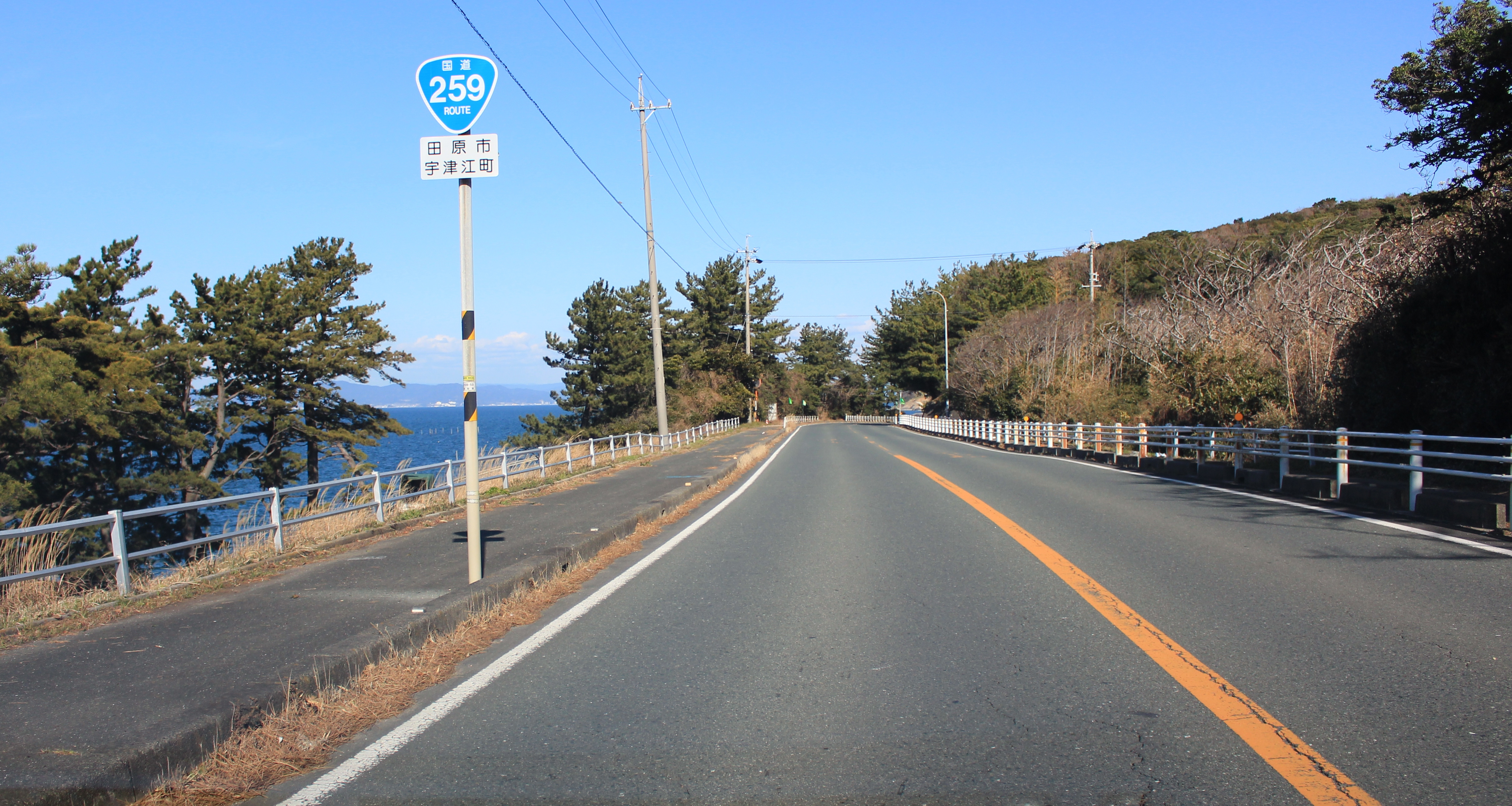

Route information
- Length: 47.0 km (29.2 mi)
- Existed: 1 April 1963–present

Major junctions
- West end: National Route 42 / National Route 167 in Toba, Mie
- East end: National Route 1 / National Route 23 in Toyohashi

Location
- Country: Japan

Highway system
- National highways of Japan; Expressways of Japan
| ← National Route 258 | → National Route 260 |

National Route 259 is a national highway of Japan connecting Toba, Mie and Toyohashi in Japan, with a total length of 47 km (29.2 mi).
