= Japan National Route 261 =

National highway in Japan

National Route 261
- 国道261号
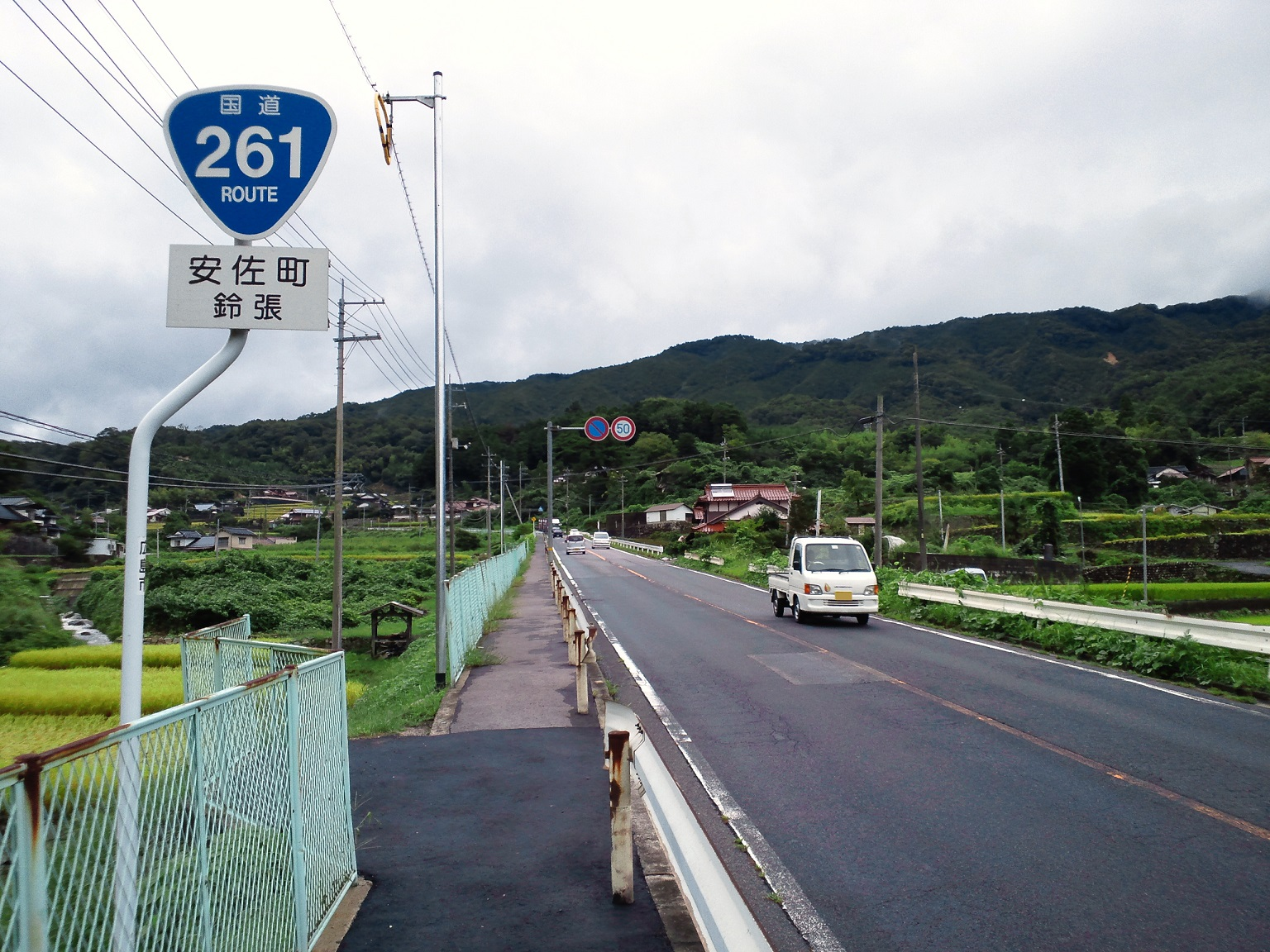

Route information
- Length: 102.2 km (63.5 mi)

Location
- Country: Japan

Highway system
- National highways of Japan; Expressways of Japan
← National Route 260	→ National Route 262

National Route 261 is a national highway of Japan connecting Naka-ku, Hiroshima and Gōtsu, Shimane in Japan, with a total length of 102.2 km (63.5 mi).
