= Japan National Route 167 =

Road in Mie prefecture, Japan

National Route 167
- 国道167号
- Japan National Route 167 highlighted in red
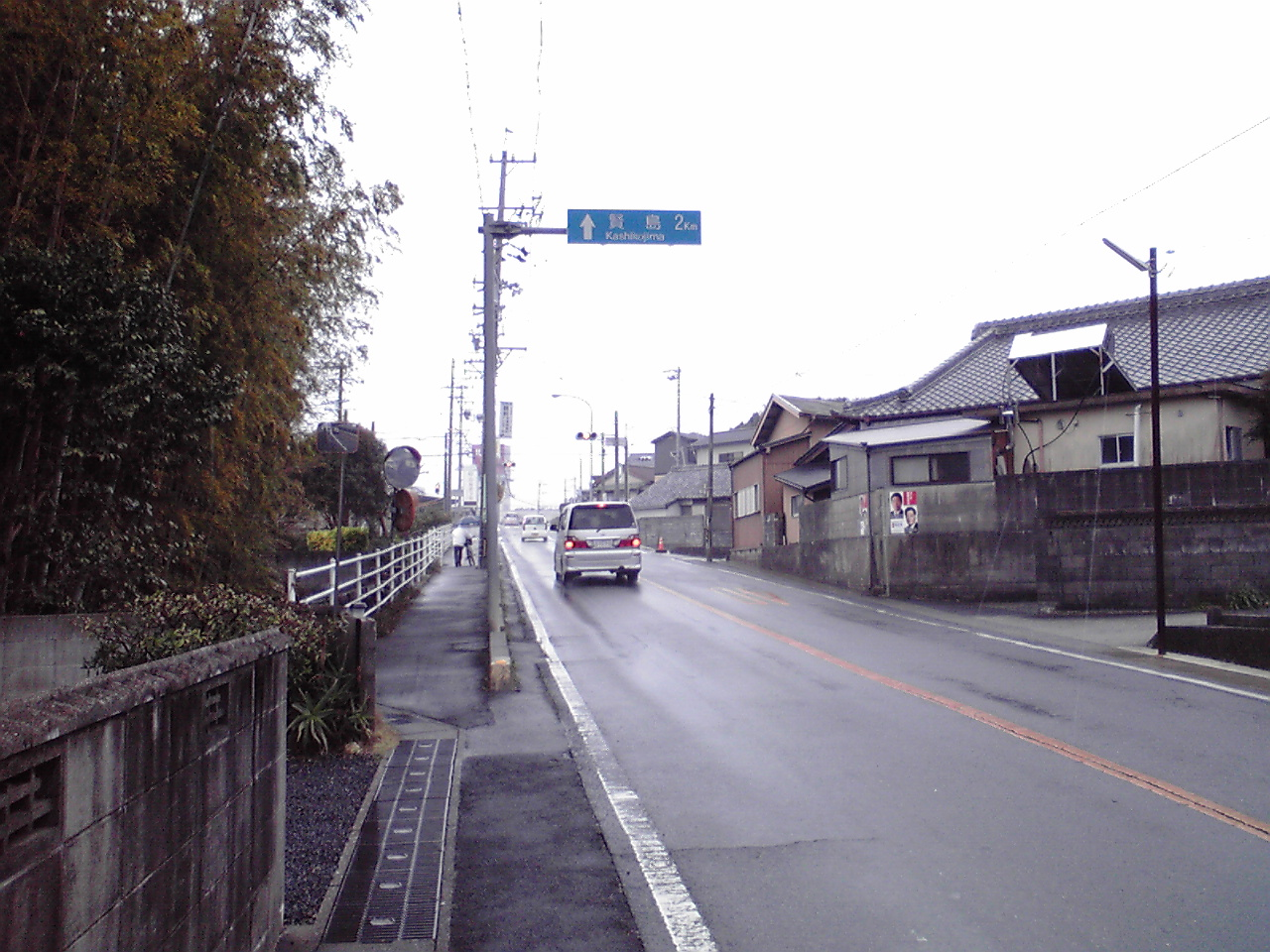

Route information
- Length: 37.9 km (23.5 mi)
- Existed: 1953–present

Major junctions
- South end: Kashikojima Station in Shima
- National Route 260; National Route 42 / National Route 259; National Route 42 (Ise Futami Toba Line); National Route 42
- North end: National Route 23 / National Route 42 in Ise

Location
- Country: Japan

Highway system
- National highways of Japan; Expressways of Japan
← National Route 166	→ National Route 168

National Route 167 (国道167号, Kokudō hyaku-rokujūnana-gō) is a national highway on Kii Peninsula in the Japanese prefecture of Mie. It stretches 37.9 kilometers (23.5 mi) from Kashikojima Station in Shima north to a junction with National Routes 23 and Route 42 in Ise.

== Route description ==
The southern terminus and starting point of National Route 167 lies just one block south of Kashikojima Station on the Ago Bay island, Kashiko that lies within the city of Shima. Traveling north off the island parallel to the Shima Line, the highway meets National Route 260 at a junction near Ugata Station.

Near Nakanogō Station in Toba, the highway has a junction with the paired highways: National Routes 42 and Route 259, which have just entered Mie Prefecture via the Ise-wan Ferry from Cape Irago in Aichi Prefecture. National Route 259 meets its western terminus here, while National Routes 42 and 167 continue north together as a concurrency out of Toba.

Upon crossing into the city of Ise, Routes 42 and 167 meet the eastern terminus of the Ise Futami Toba Line, a limited-access highway signed as a bypass of National Route 42. The northern terminus and ending point of National Route 167 is at an intersection where the concurrency between it and National Route 42 meet National Route 23. National Route 42 continues beyond the ending point of National Route 167 in another concurrency with National Route 23.

== History ==
National Route 167 was originally designated on 18 May 1953 as a second-class national highway connecting then-extant town Ago (the former town was merged into Shima in on 1 October 2004) to Ise.

== Junction list ==
Mie Prefecture

- Kashikojima Station (southern terminus)
- National Route 260
- National Route 42 / National Route 259
- National Route 42 (Ise Futami Toba Line)
- National Route 42
- National Route 23 / National Route 42 (northern terminus)
