= Isobe, Mie =

Dissolved municipality in Mie prefecture, Japan

Isobe (磯部町, Isobe-chō) was a town located in the former Shima District, Mie Prefecture, Japan.

As of 2003, the town had an estimated population of 9,172 and a density of 117.29 persons per km^{2}. The total area was 78.20 km^{2}.

On October 1, 2004, Isobe, along with the towns of Shima (former), Ago, Daiō and Hamajima (all from Shima District), was merged to create the city of Shima and no longer exists as an independent municipality.

== Localities/Areas ==
Isobe Town is sub-divided into 3 localities/areas: Isobe (proper), Matoya and Seiki, which are sub-divided into 10 hamlets.

=== Isobe Area ===
(4 hamlets)

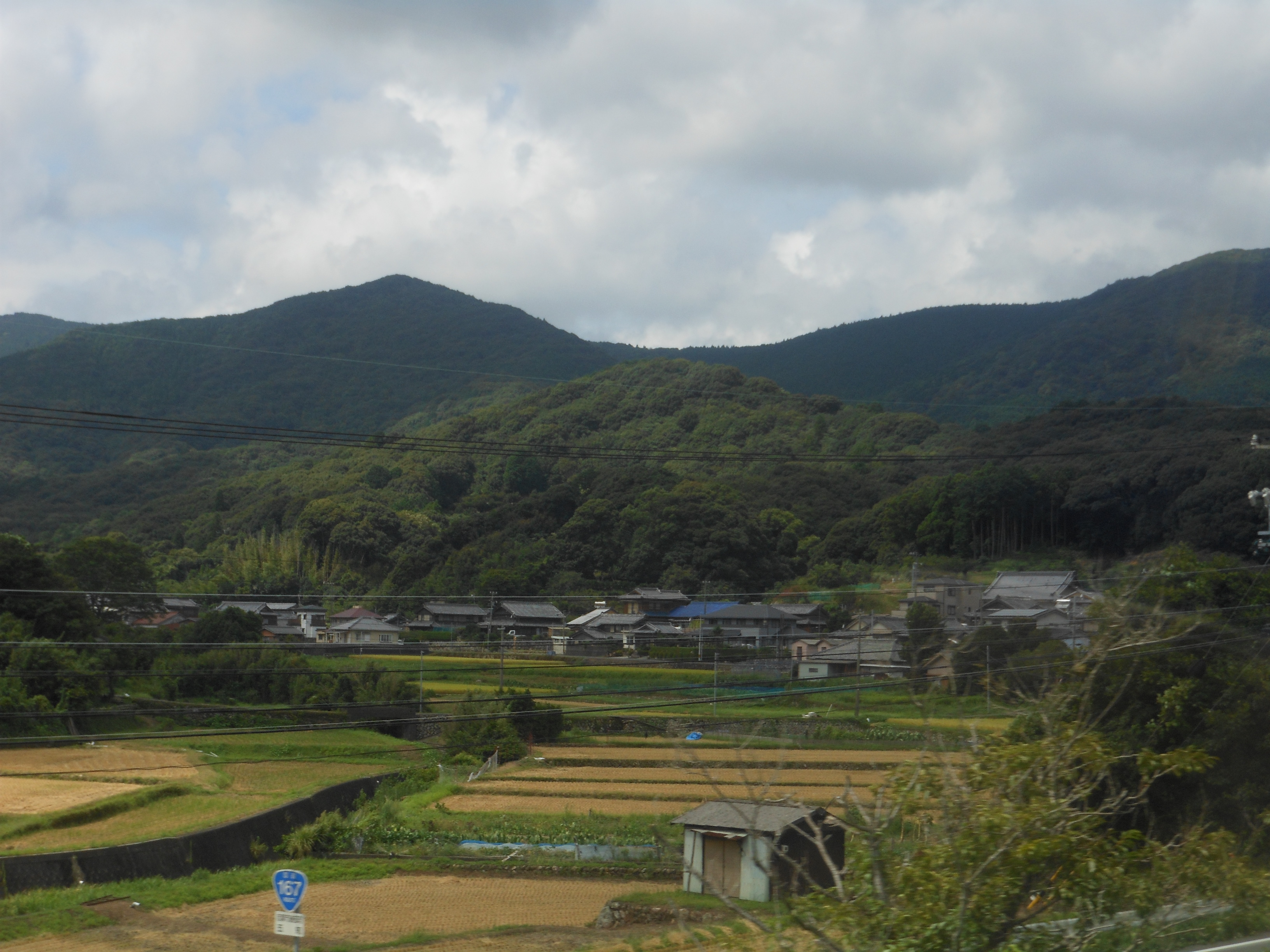
Gochi (五知)

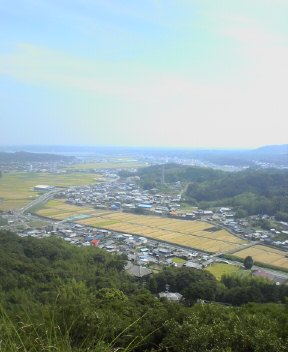
Erihara (恵利原)

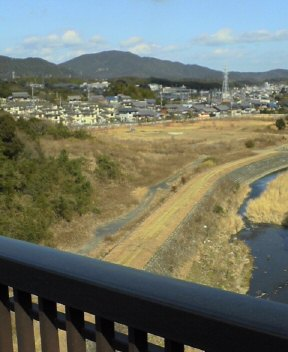
Hasama (迫間)

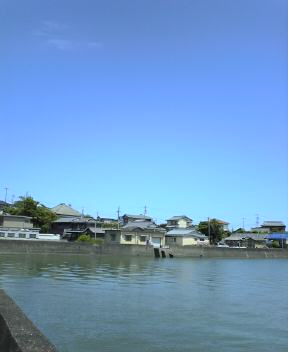
Iihama (飯浜)

=== Matoya Area ===
(3 hamlets)

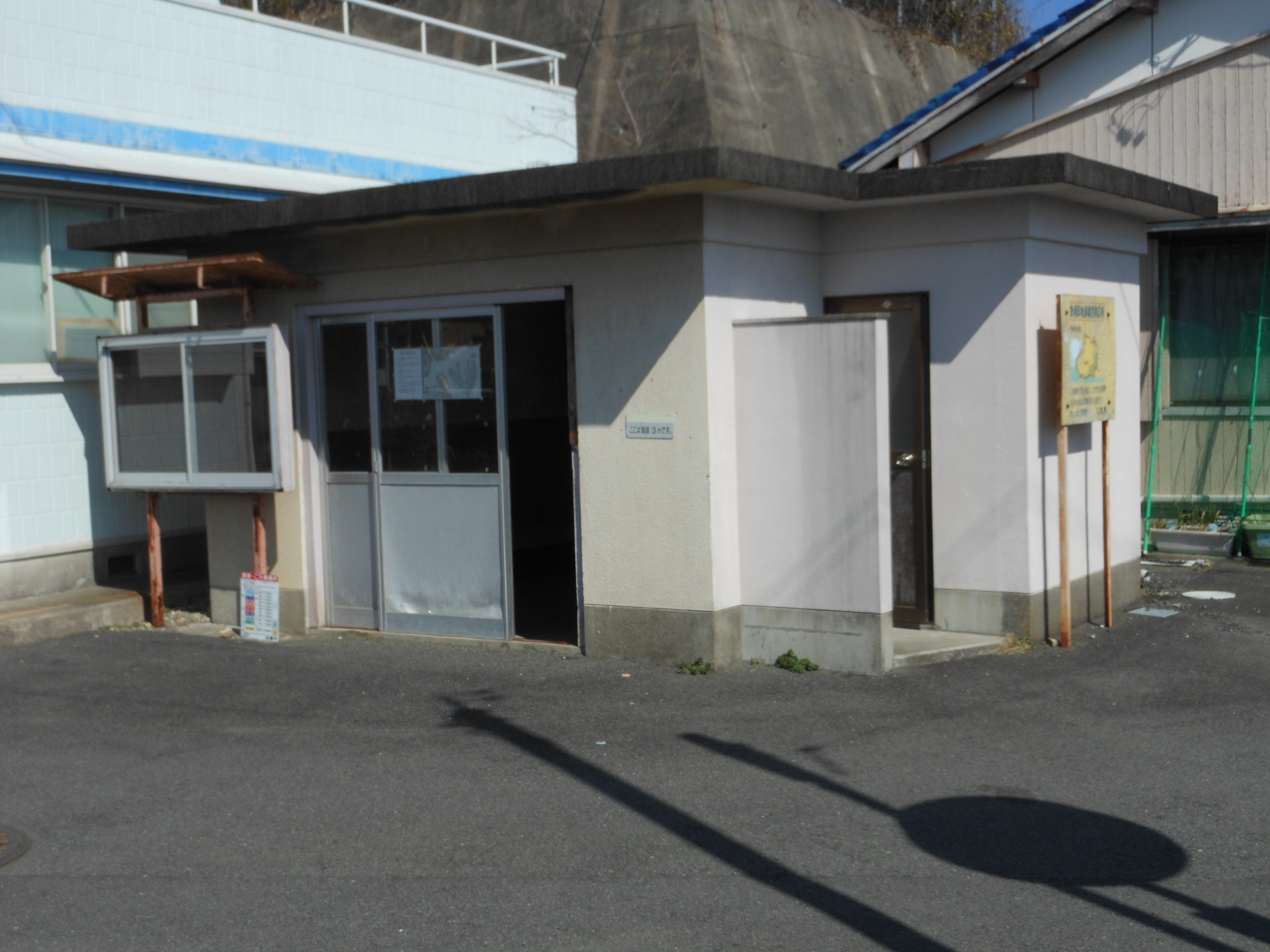
Matoya (的矢)

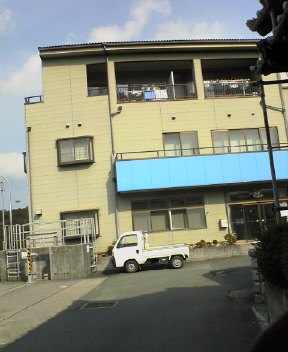
Sangasho (三ヶ所)

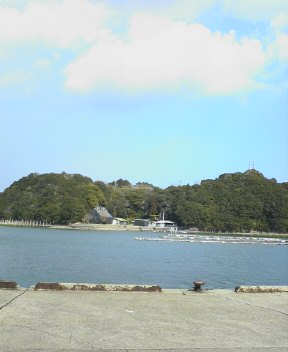
Watakano (渡鹿野)

=== Seiki Area ===
(3 hamlets)

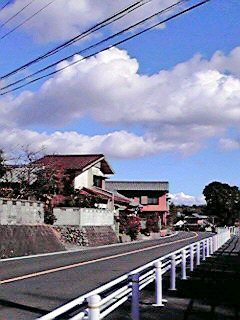
Yamahara (山原)

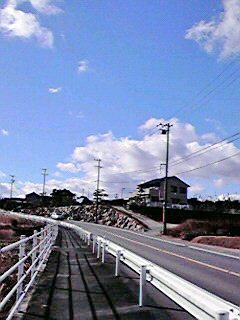
Kurikihiro (栗木広)

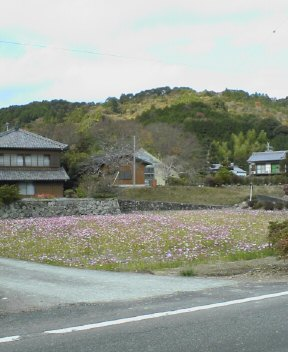
Hiyama (桧山)
