= Daiō, Mie =

Dissolved municipality in Mie prefecture, Japan

Daiō (大王町, Daiō-chō) was a town located in the former Shima District, Mie Prefecture, Japan.

As of 2003, the town had an estimated population of 8,154 and a density of 632.09 persons per km^{2}. The total area was 12.90 km^{2}.

On October 1, 2004, Daiō, along with the towns of Shima (former), Ago, Hamajima and Isobe (all from Shima District), was merged to create the city of Shima and no longer exists as an independent municipality.
