= Hamajima, Mie =

Dissolved municipality in Shima district, Mie prefecture, Japan

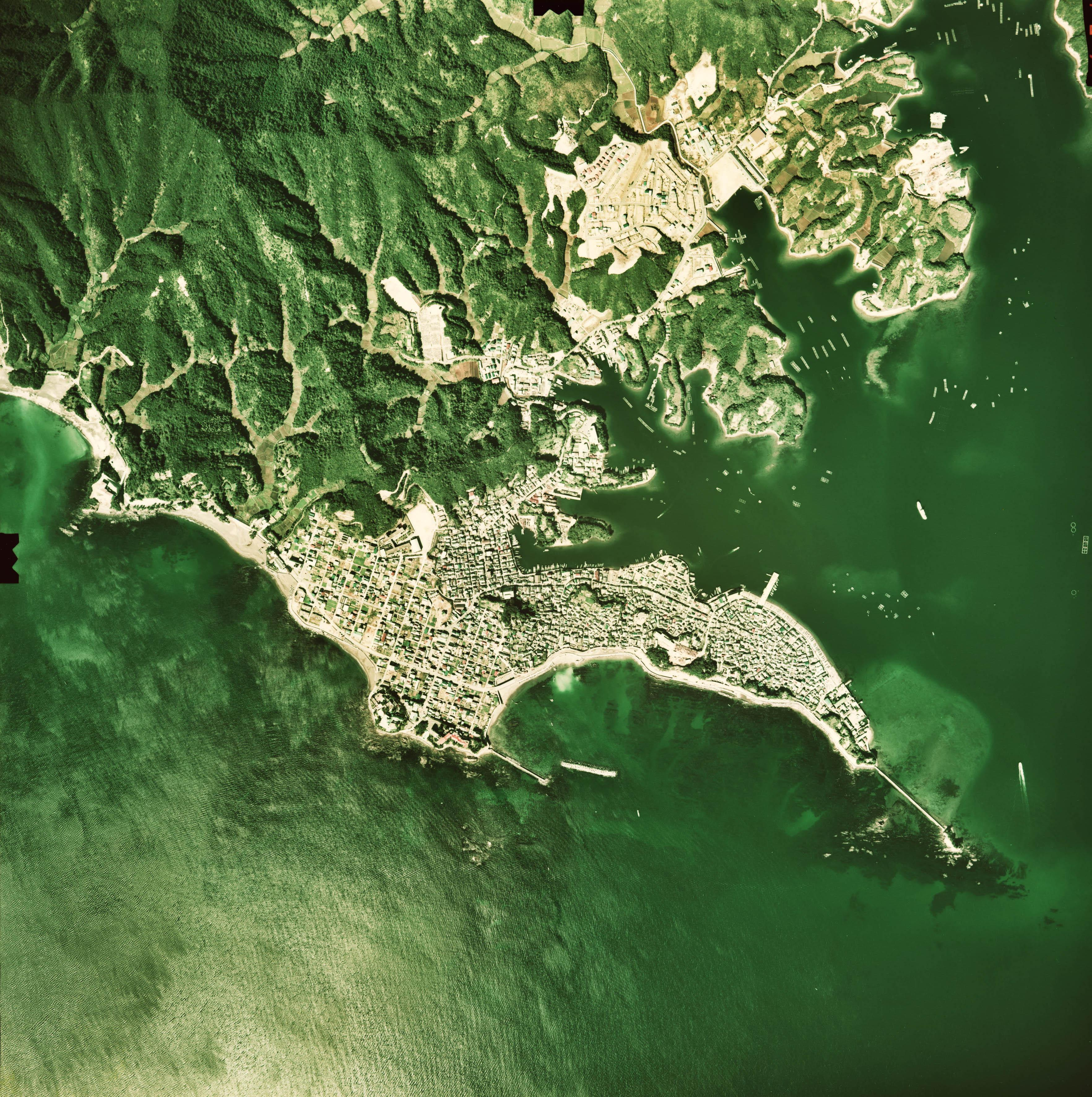
An aerial photograph of Hamajima town (1975) from the National Land Image Information (Color Aerial Photographs), Ministry of Land, Infrastructure, Transport and Tourism

Hamajima (浜島町, Hamajima-chō) was a town located in the former Shima District, Mie Prefecture, Japan.

As of 2003, the town had an estimated population of 5,686 and a density of 205.72 persons per km^{2}. The total area was 27.64 km^{2}.

On October 1, 2004, Hamajima, along with the towns of Shima (former), Ago, Daiō and Isobe (all from Shima District), was merged to create the city of Shima and no longer exists as an independent municipality.
