= Shima, Mie =

Shima 志摩市
- City
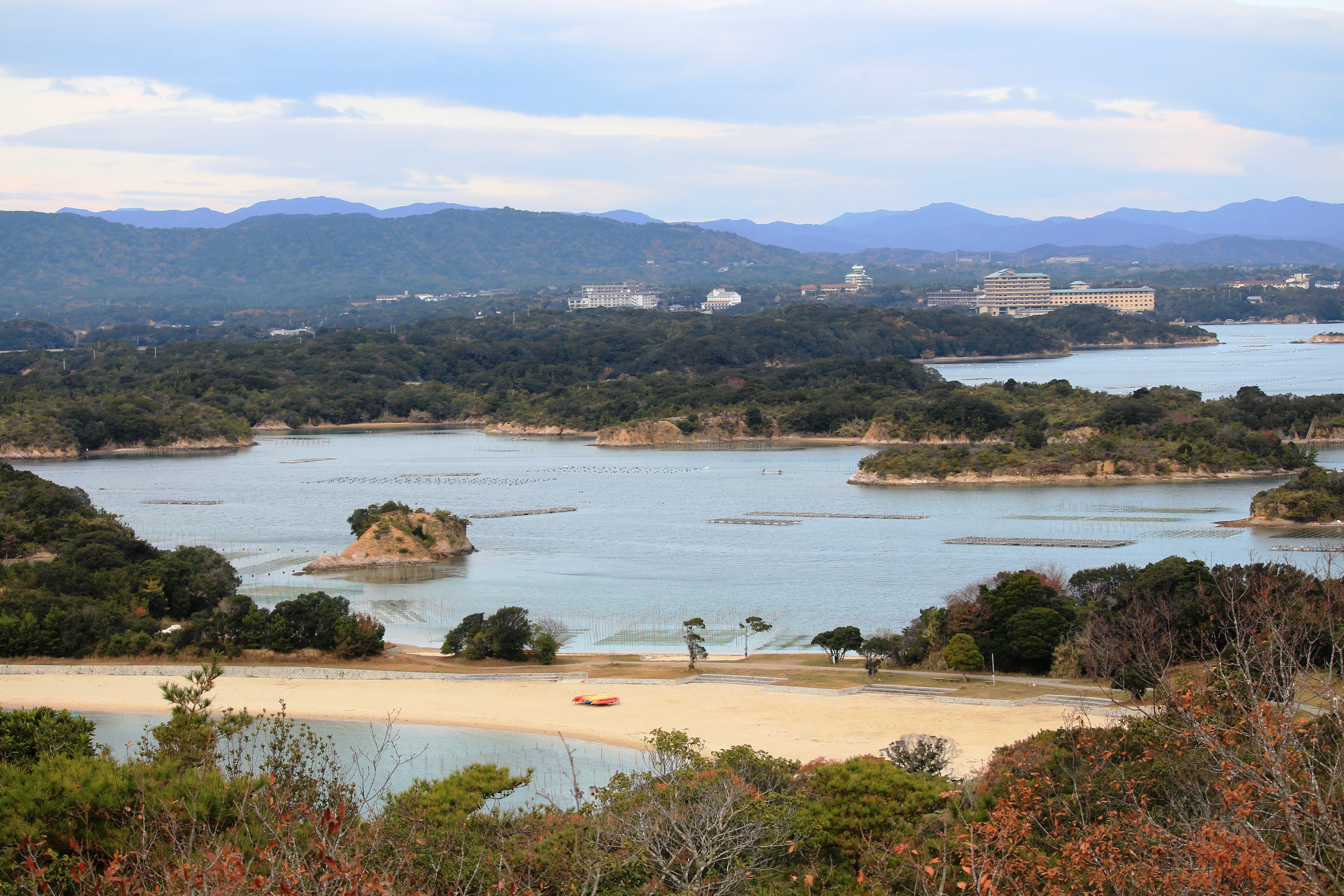
- Jirōrokurō Beach in Ago Bay, Shima

- Flag Emblem

- Location of Shima in Mie Prefecture

- Coordinates: 34°20′N 136°50′E
- Country: Japan
- Region: Kansai
- Prefecture: Mie

Government
  - Mayor: Chihiro Takeuchi

Area
  - Total: 179.67 km^{2} (69.37 sq mi)

Population (January 31, 2024)
  - Total: 45,073
  - Density: 250.87/km^{2} (649.74/sq mi)
- Time zone: UTC+9 (Japan Standard Time)
- Tree: Albizia julibrissin
- Flower: Crinum asiaticum
- Bird: Kentish plover
- Fish: Japanese spiny lobster
- Phone number: 0599-44-0001
- Address: 3098-22 Agocho; Ugata, Shima-shi, Mie-ken 517-0592
- Website: Official website

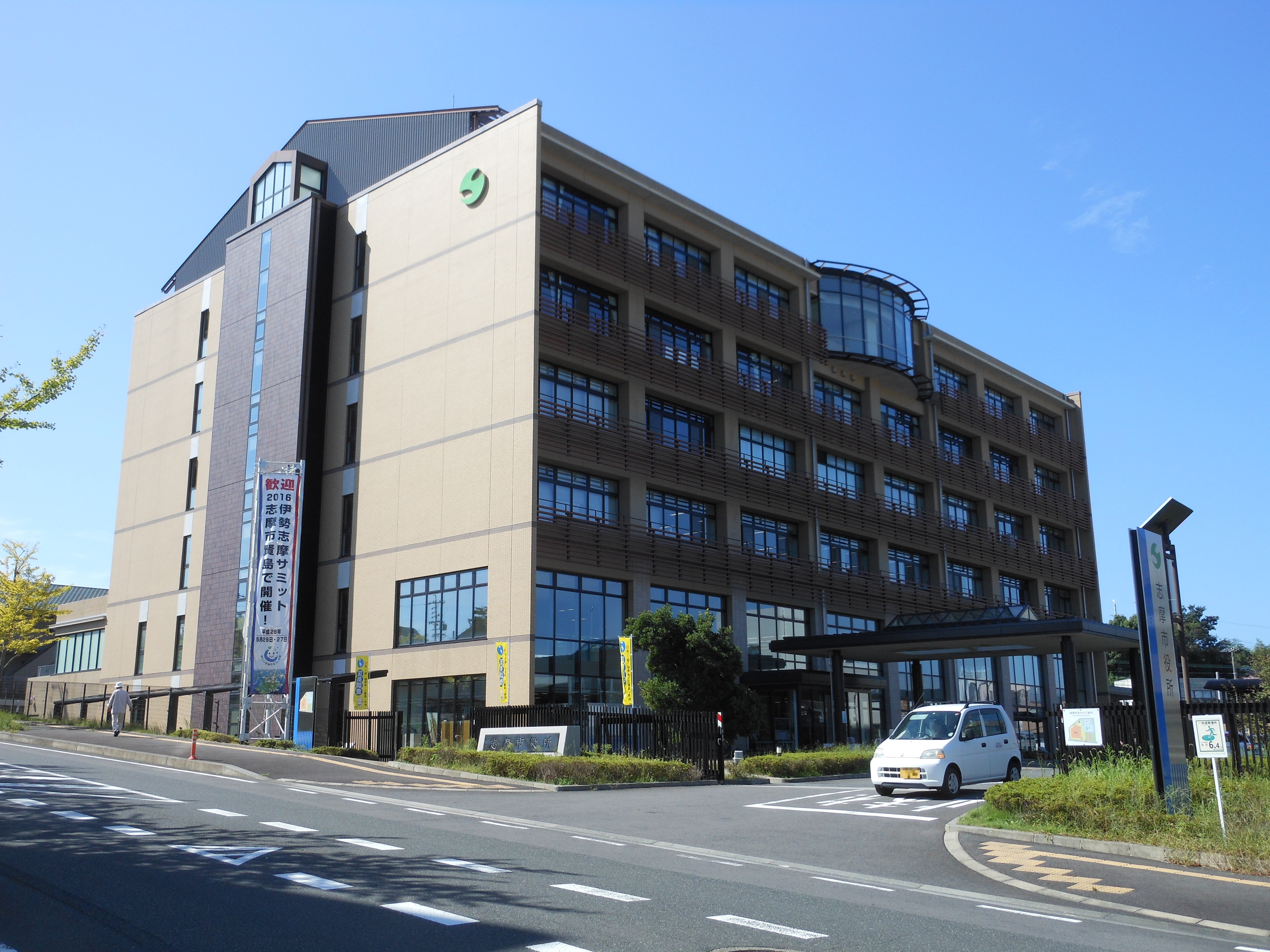
Shima City Hall

Shima (志摩市, Shima-shi; Japanese pronunciation: [ɕí.mä̀, ɕì.mä́.ɕì]) is a city in Mie Prefecture, Japan. As of 31 January 2024, the city had an estimated population of 45,073 in 22,511 households and a population density of 251 persons per km^{2}. The total area of the city is 179.67 square kilometres (69.37 sq mi). Shima hosted the 2016 G7 Summit.

== Geography ==
Shima is located on the southern half of Shima Peninsula in far eastern Mie Prefecture, facing Ise Bay of the Pacific Ocean. The city has a complicated rias coast with two large inlets: Matoya Bay and Ago Bay. Matoya Bay is famous for oyster cultivation and Ago Bay is famous for pearl cultivation. Both are sightseeing spots and all of the city is within the borders of the Ise-Shima National Park.

Shima has three inhabited islands; Watakano Island, Kashiko Island and Masaki Island. Watakano Island is located in Matoya Bay, and the others are in Ago Bay.

== Climate ==
Shima has a humid subtropical climate (Köppen Cfa) characterized by warm summers and cool winters with light to no snowfall. The average annual temperature in Shima is 16.6 °C. The average annual rainfall is 1965 mm with September as the wettest month. The temperatures are highest on average in August, at around 26.6 °C, and lowest in January, at around 6.8 °C.

== Demographics ==
Per Japanese census data, the population of Shima has decreased rapidly over the past 20 years.

Historical population
Year	Pop.	±%
1950	65,444	—
1960	65,266	−0.3%
1970	62,032	−5.0%
1980	63,065	+1.7%
1990	62,877	−0.3%
2000	61,628	−2.0%
2010	54,694	−11.3%
2020	46,057	−15.8%

== History ==
All of Shima was within the borders of ancient Shima Province. With the creation of the modern municipalities system on April 1, 1889, the town of Waga and villages of Katada, Fuseda, Koshiga, and Goza were established. The town of Shima was established on December 1, 1954 by the merger of these municipalities. Shima was raised to city status on October 1, 2004, from the merger of the former town of Shima with the towns of Ago, Daiō, Hamajima and Isobe (all from Shima District). Recently there has been anger from its famous divers aimed at its sexist new tourist mascot.

== Government ==
Shima has a mayor-council form of government with a directly elected mayor and a unicameral city council of 20 members. Shima contributes two members to the Mie Prefectural Assembly. In terms of national politics, the city is part of Mie 4th district of the lower house of the Diet of Japan.

== Economy ==
Commercial fishing and tourism play important roles in the local economy.

== Education ==
Shima has seven public elementary schools and six public middle schools operated by the city government and two public high schools operated by the Mie Prefectural Department of Education. There is also one private high school.

== Transportation ==
=== Railway ===
Kintetsu Railway - Shima Line

- Gochi - Kutsukake - Kaminogō - Shima-Isobe - Anagawa - Shima-Yokoyama - Ugata - Shima-Shimmei - Kashikojima

=== Highways ===
- Iseshima Skyline
- National Route 167
- National Route 260

== Local attractions ==
Two of Japan's fifteen climbable lighthouses are located in Shima: Anorisaki and Daiosaki. Each was featured in the location shooting of two prominent films of the 1950s, Anorisaki in Kinoshita's Times of Joy and Sorrow (1957) and Daiosaki in Ozu's Floating Weeds (1959).

Shima Spain Village, a Spain-themed amusement park, is located here.

== Notable people ==
- Haruka No. 2
