= Ugata Station =

Railway station in Shima, Mie Prefecture, Japan

Ugata Station 鵜方駅
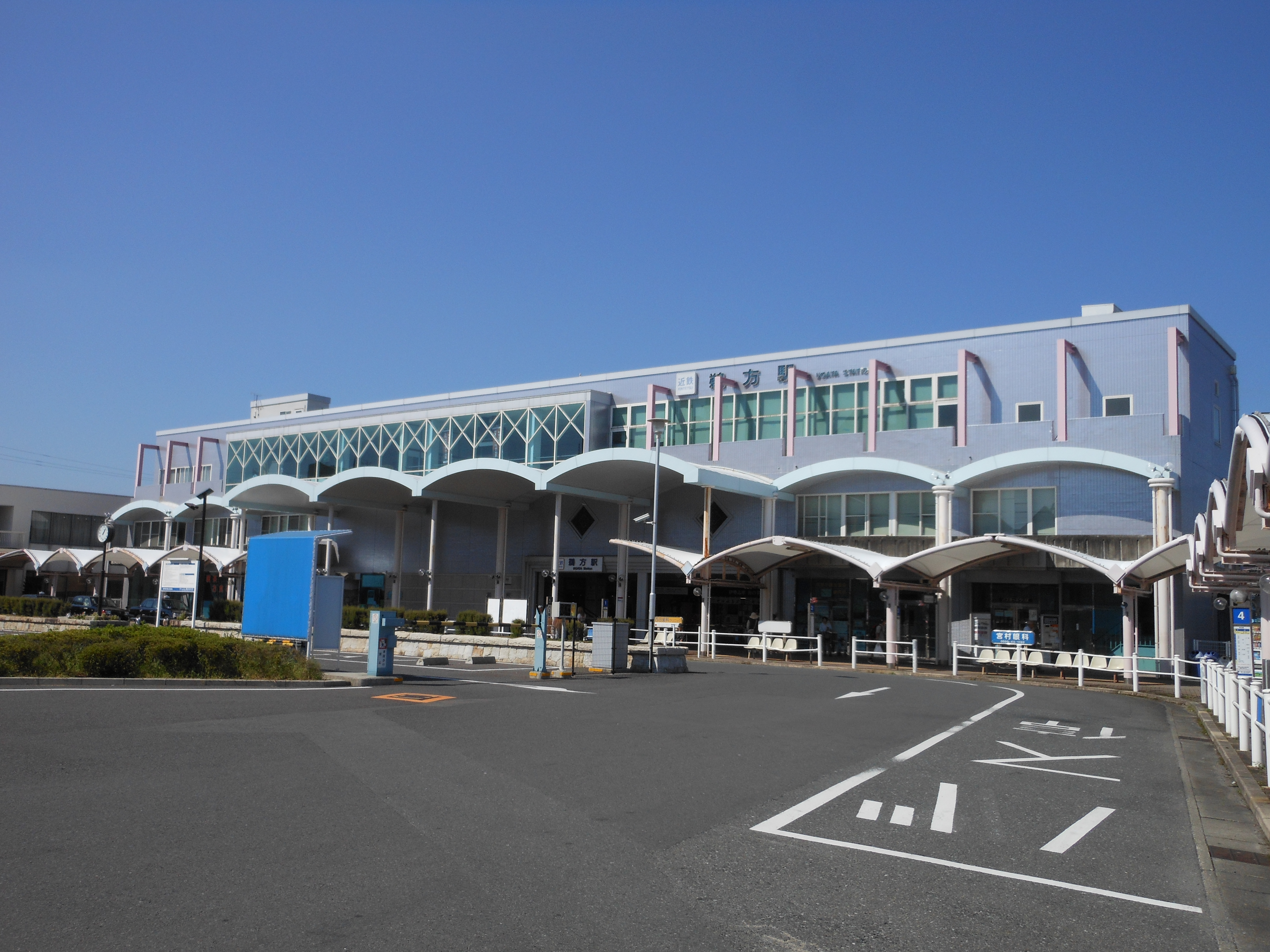
- Ugata Station

General information
- Location: Ago-cho Ugata 1670-2, Shima-shi, Mie-ken 517-0501; Japan
- Coordinates: 34.3293676°N 136.8259406°E
- Operator: Kintetsu Railway
- Line: Shima Line
- Distance: 62.8 km from Ise-Nakagawa
- Platforms: 1 island platform
- Connections: Bus terminal

Other information
- Station code: M91
- Website: Official website

History
- Opened: July 23, 1929; 97 years ago

Passengers
- FY2019: 960 daily
Location
- Location within Mie Prefecture Location within Japan

Ugata Station (鵜方駅, Ugata-eki) is a passenger railway station in located in the city of Shima, Mie Prefecture, Japan, operated by the private railway operator Kintetsu Railway.

== Lines ==
Ugata Station is served by the Shima Line, and is located 62.8 rail kilometers from the terminus of the line at Ise-Nakagawa Station.

== Station layout ==
The station was consists of a single island platform in an elevated station building.

=== Platforms ===
1	■ Shima Line	for Kashikojima
2	■ Shima Line	for Toba, Nagoya, Osaka Namba and Kyoto

== Adjacent stations ==
«	Service	»
Shima Line
Shima-Yokoyama	Local	Shima-Shimmei
Shima-Isobe	Limited Express	Kashikojima
Toba	Limited Express "Shimakaze"	Kashikojima

== History ==
Ugata Station opened on July 23, 1929 as a station on the Shima Electric Railway. The line was one of six private companies consolidated into Mie Kotsu by order of the Japanese government on February 11, 1944. When Mie Kotsu dissolved on February 1, 1964, the station became part of the Mie Electric Railway, which was then acquired by Kintetsu on April 1, 1965. The station building was rebuilt in March 1994.

== Passenger statistics ==
In fiscal 2019, the station was used by an average of 960 passengers daily (boarding passengers only).

== Surrounding area ==
- Shima City Hall
- Goza Shirahama beach
- Shima tourism information center

== See also ==
- List of railway stations in Japan
