= Ago, Mie =

Dissolved municipality in Mie prefecture, Japan

Ago (阿児町, Ago-chō) was a town located in the former Shima District, Mie Prefecture, Japan.

As of 2003, the town had an estimated population of 22,972 and a density of 523.52 persons per km^{2}. The total area was 43.88 km^{2}.

On October 1, 2004, Ago, along with the towns of Shima (former), Daiō, Hamajima and Isobe (all from Shima District), was merged to create the city of Shima and no longer exists as an independent municipality.
