= Shima-Isobe Station =

Railway station in Shima, Mie Prefecture, Japan

Shima-Isobe Station 志摩磯部駅
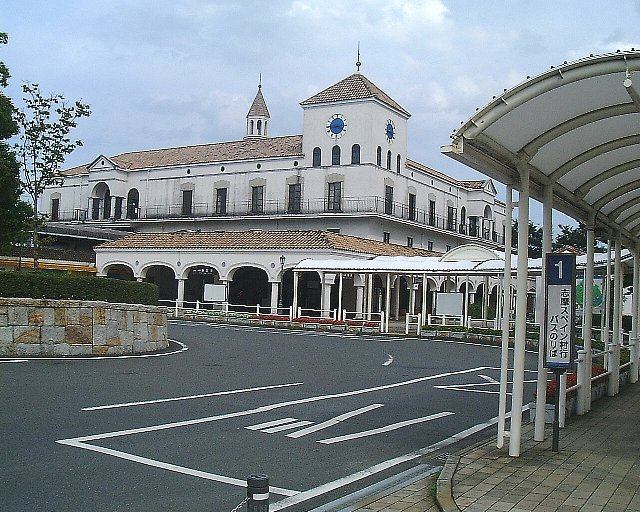
- Shima-Isobe Station

General information
- Location: Isobe-cho Hasama 1819, Shima-shi, Mie-ken 517-0214; Japan
- Coordinates: 34.3699188°N 136.8054056°E
- Operator: Kintetsu Railway
- Line: Shima Line
- Distance: 57.5 km from Ise-Nakagawa
- Platforms: 1 side + 1 island platform
- Connections: Bus terminal

Other information
- Station code: M88
- Website: Official website

History
- Opened: July 23, 1929; 97 years ago
- Former names: Hasama (until 1970)

Passengers
- FY2019: 482 daily
Location
- Location within Mie Prefecture Location within Japan

Shima-Isobe Station (志摩磯部駅, Shima-Isobe-eki) is a passenger railway station in located in the city of Shima, Mie Prefecture, Japan, operated by the private railway operator Kintetsu Railway.

== Lines ==
Shima-Isobe Station is served by the Shima Line, and is located 57.5 rail kilometers from the terminus of the line at Ise-Nakagawa Station.

== Station layout ==
The station consists of a single island platform and a single island platform serving three tracks, connected to an elevated station building by footbridges. However, Platform 3 is a deadhead platform, and is not used for passenger embarkation or disembarkation.

=== Platforms ===
3	■ deadhead trains	
1	■ Shima Line	for Ugata and Kashikojima
2	■ Shima Line	for Toba, Nagoya, Osaka Namba and Kyoto

== Adjacent stations ==
«	Service	»
Shima Line
Toba	Limited Express	Ugata
Kaminogō	Local	Anagawa

== History ==
Shima-Isobe Station opened on July 23, 1929, as Hasama Station (迫間駅, Hasama eki) on the Shima Electric Railway. The line was one of six private companies consolidated into Mie Kotsu by order of the Japanese government on February 11, 1944. When Mie Kotsu dissolved on February 1, 1964, the station became part of the Mie Electric Railway, which was then acquired by Kintetsu on April 1, 1965. The station was rebuilt and renamed to its present name on March 1, 1970.

== Passenger statistics ==
In fiscal 2019, the station was used by an average of 482 passengers daily (boarding passengers only).

== Surrounding area ==
- Isobe Post Office
- Shima High School

== See also ==
- List of railway stations in Japan
