= Kashikojima Station =

Railway station in Shima, Mie Prefecture, Japan

Kashikojima Station 賢島駅
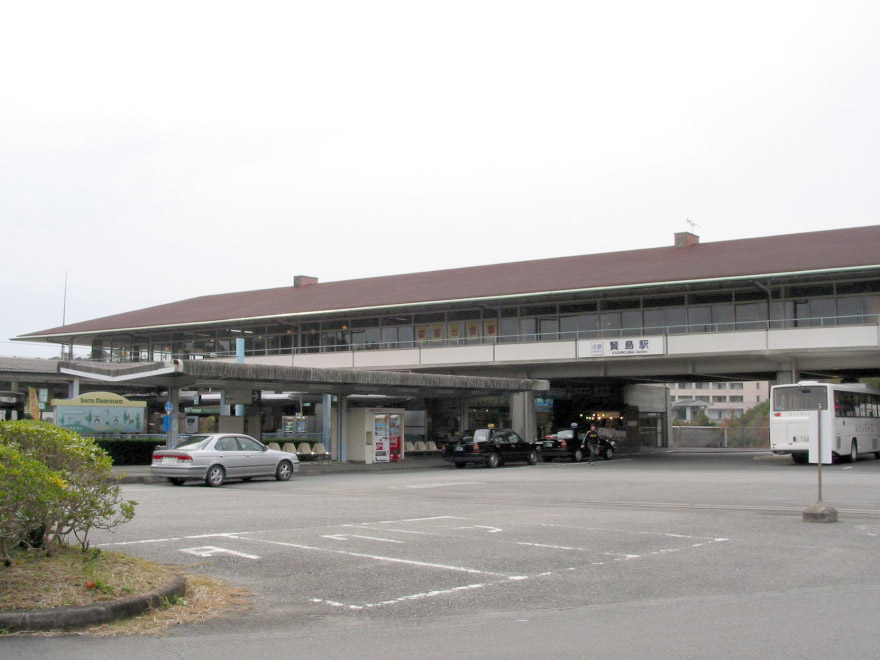
- Kashikojima Station

General information
- Location: 747-17 Agochō Shinmei, Shima-shi, Mie-ken 517-0502; Japan
- Coordinates: 34.3084909°N 136.8186021°E
- Operator: Kintetsu Railway
- Line: Shima Line
- Distance: 66.0 km from Ise-Nakagawa
- Platforms: 4 bay platforms
- Connections: Bus terminal

Other information
- Station code: M93
- Website: Official website

History
- Opened: July 23, 1929; 97 years ago

Passengers
- FY2019: 730 daily
Location
- Location within Mie Prefecture Location within Japan

Kashikojima Station (賢島駅, Kashikojima-eki) is a passenger railway station in located in the city of Shima, Mie Prefecture, Japan, operated by the private railway operator Kintetsu Railway.

== Lines ==
Kashikojima Station is a terminus of the Shima Line and a common destination for Kintetsu limited express trains from Nagoya, Osaka and Kyoto. The station is 66.0 rail kilometers from the opposing terminus of the Shima Line at Ise-Nakagawa Station.

== Station layout ==
The station consists of four ground-level bay platforms serving 5 tracks. The floor is almost flat between the platforms and north entrance.

=== Platforms ===
1, 2	■ Shima Line	limited express trains (8-car length) for Kintetsu Nagoya
2, 3	■ Shima Line	<arrival platform>
3, 4	■ Shima Line	limited express trains (8-car length) for Osaka Namba, Osaka Uehommachi and Kyoto
5	■ Shima Line	local trains (2-car length) for Toba, Ujiyamada and Ise-Nakagawa

== Adjacent stations ==
«	Service	»
Shima Line
Shima-Shimmei	Local	Terminus
Ugata	Limited Express	Terminus

== History ==
Kashikojima Station opened on July 23, 1929 as a station on the Shima Electric Railway. The line was one of six private companies consolidated into Mie Kotsu by order of the Japanese government on February 11, 1944. When Mie Kotsu dissolved on February 1, 1964, the station became part of the Mie Electric Railway, which was then acquired by Kintetsu on April 1, 1965.

== Passenger statistics ==
In fiscal 2019, the station was used by an average of 730 passengers daily (boarding passengers only).

== Surrounding area ==
- Shima Kanko Hotel
- Shima Marine Land
- Ago Bay
- Kashikojima Country Club
- Goza beach

== See also ==
- List of railway stations in Japan
