= Mie Kotsu =

Public transit company in Japan

Mie Kotsu Co., Ltd.
- Native name: 三重交通株式会社
- Romanized name: Mie Kōtsū kabushiki gaisha
- Company type: Subsidiary (Kabushiki gaisha)
- Industry: Bus, taxi, real estate
- Founded: February 26, 1931
- Headquarters: Tsu, Mie, Japan
- Area served: Mie Prefecture
- Key people: Akiyoshi Moriguchi, President
- Owner: Kintetsu Group Holdings
- Parent: Mie Kotsu Group Holdings, Inc.
- Website: www.sanco.co.jp

Mie Kotsu (三重交通株式会社, Mie-kōtsū Kabushiki-gaisha), known as Sanco (三交, Sankō) for short, is a public transportation company, which operates local and long-distance buses in and around Mie Prefecture, Japan. The company has other ventures, including a taxicab business and real estate. Mie Kotsu used to also own railway lines, but no longer operates in the rail transport sector – Mie Kotsu's former rail assets are now owned by Kintetsu Railway, its parent company.
