= Saminaga Shrine =

Shinto shrine in Japan

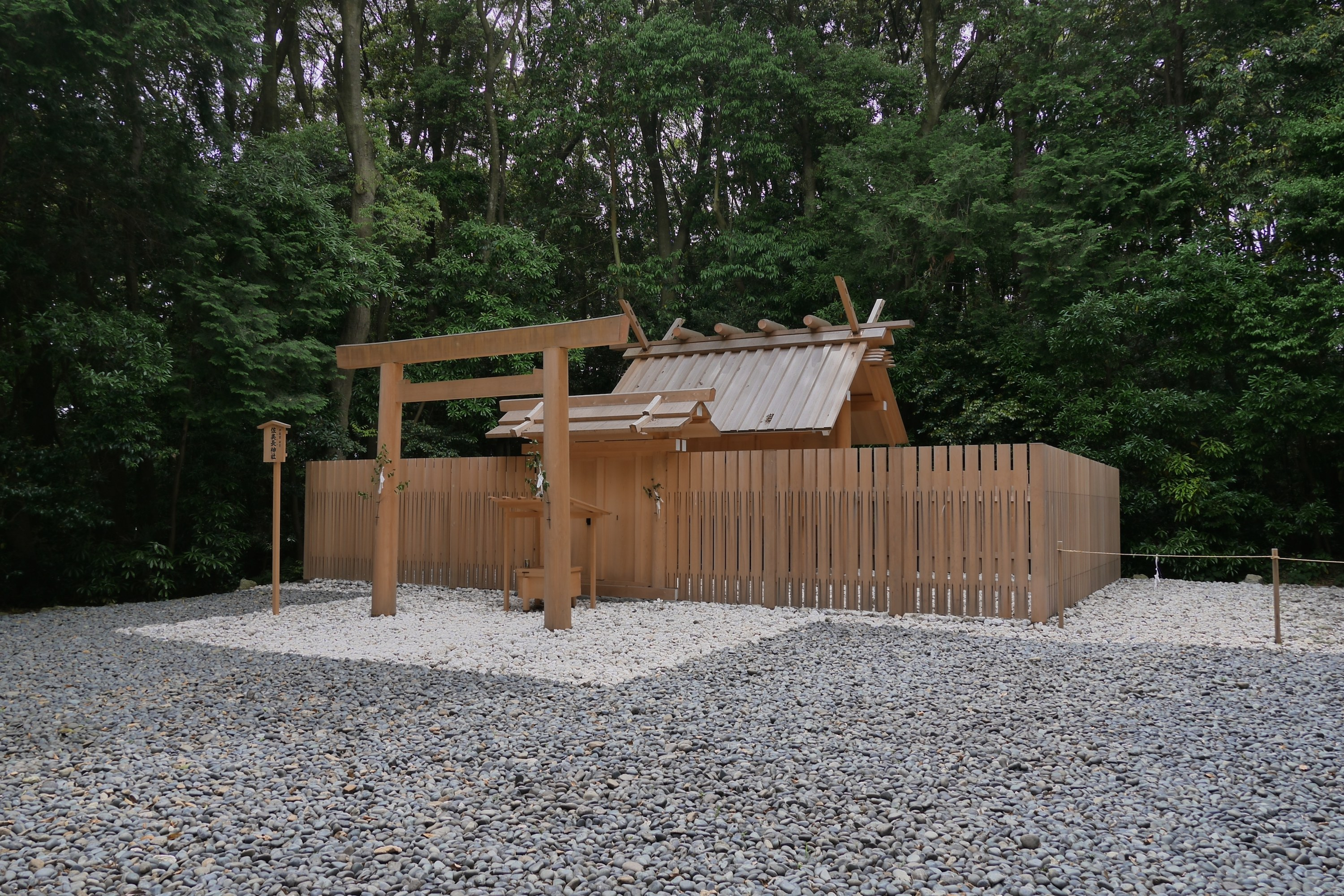

- Location within Japan

Religion
- Affiliation: Shinto
- Deity: Toshigami

Location
- Location: Isobecho-Erihara, Shima City, Mie Prefecture
- Interactive map of Saminaga Shrine
- Coordinates: 34°22′31″N 136°48′13″E

Architecture
- Established: Traditionally dated to the 27th year of Emperor Suinin

Saminaga Shrine is a shrine under the jurisdiction of Izawa-no-miya, which is an auxiliary shrine of the Ise Inner Shrine. It is dedicated to Toshigami, one of the kami of the Shinto pantheon. Saminaga Gomae Shrine is also located in the same grounds as the Saminaga Shrine.

== Location and history ==
It is located in the region locally called Kawabe in Isobecho-Erihara, Shima City, Mie Prefecture. The shrine is located atop a small hillock at an altitude of about 10 m (33 ft). The shrine is said to have been located either below sea level or a wetland area until the Edo period, before being moved to the current site atop the hill. According to the Yamato-hime-no-mikoto Seiki, the it was enshrined alongside Izawa-no-miya. However, the Naiku Sengu records from the second year of Antei era indicates that it was located further to the southwest.

The Ise Ryōgū Bekkyū Setsumatsusha lists the shrine as a subordinate shrine of the Ise Inner Shrine, managed by the Izawa-no-miya. The Saminaga Shrine holds the highest rank amongst the five shrines under Izawa-no-miya’s management. The shrine is currently approximately 800 m (2,600 ft) from Izawa-no-miya. The path connecting the two shrines is called "Gokō-michi" and it is said that the deity used to travel between the shrines along the path. According to the Yamato-hime-no-mikoto Seiki the shrine was founded in the 27th year of Emperor Suinin’s reign (9th lunar month).

== Architecture ==
The main shrine hall ("Honden") is built in the Shinmei-zukuri style, with a plank roof, railings, and steps. It faces east, which is unusually for Shinto shrines under the Ise. During the Sengū process carried out during each Shikinen cycle, the Shintai is re-oriented north-south. The location and orientation of the shrine may have been influenced by the Izawa bay to the east. A torii gate stands at the front, with 36 stone steps leading to the shrine.

== Deity ==
The enshrined deity is Toshigami, one of the kami of the Shinto religion. Also known as Ōtoshi no Kami, the deity is interpreted as an agricultural god, and a child of Susanoo.

== Transportation ==
The shrine is located off the Japan National Route 167 connectingShima with Ise. It can be accessed from the Shima-Isobe Station on the Shima Line.
