= Izawa-no-miya =

Shinto shrine in Shima, Mie, Japan

Izawa-no-miya 伊雑宮
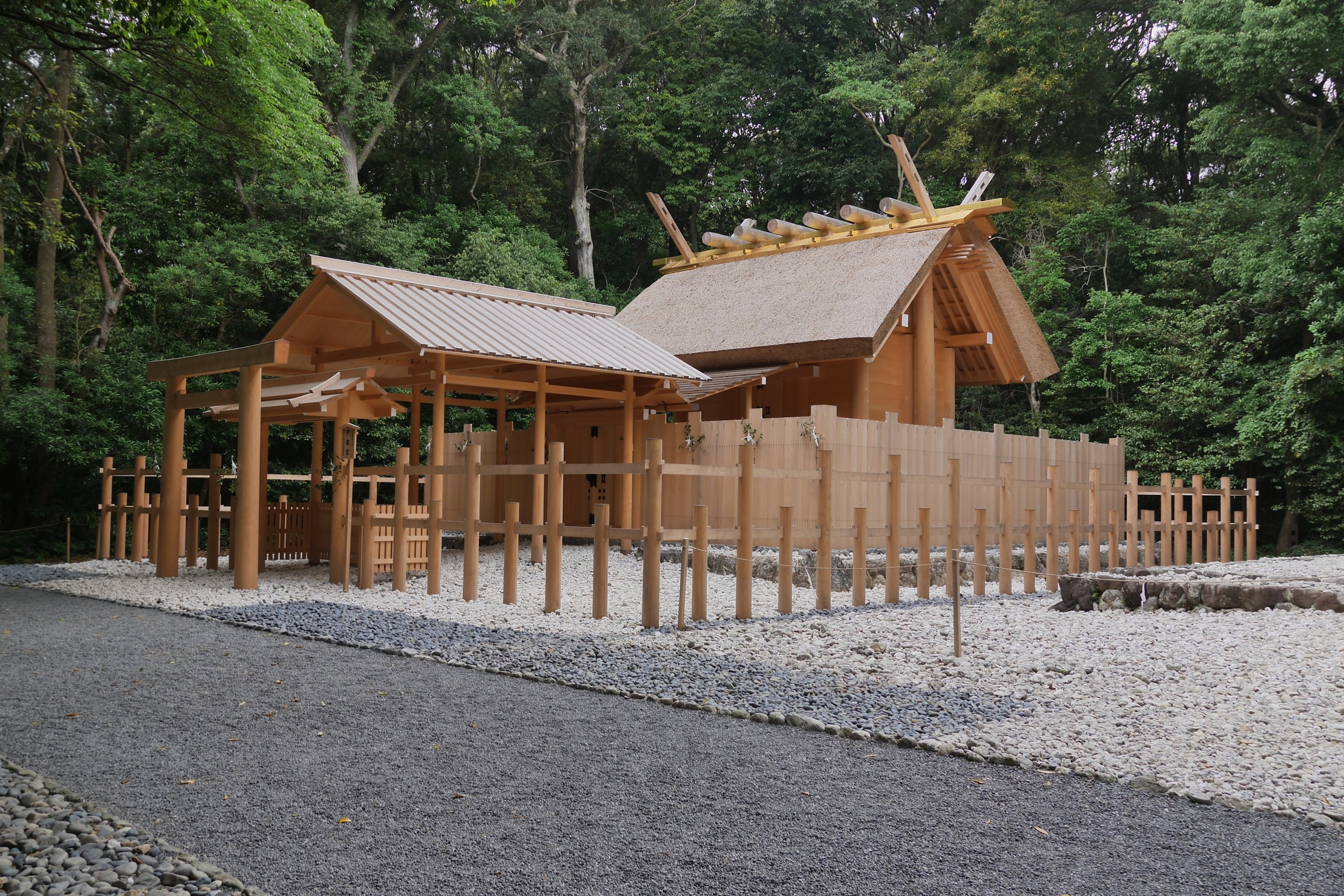
- Izawa-no-miya

- Location within Mie Prefecture Location within Japan

Religion
- Affiliation: Shinto
- Deity: Amaterasu

Location
- Location: Kaminogō, Isobe-cho, Shima-shi, Mie-ken
- Interactive map of Izawa-no-miya 伊雑宮
- Coordinates: 34°22′49″N 136°48′32″E

Architecture
- Style: Shinmei-zukuri
- Established: unknown

Izawa-no-miya (伊雑宮) is a Shinto shrine in the Kaminogō neighborhood of Isobe in the city of Shima in Mie Prefecture, Japan. It is one of the two shrines claiming the title of ichinomiya of former Shima Province. Together with the Takihara-no-miya (瀧原宮) in Taiki, it is one of the Amaterasu-Ōkami no Tonomiya (天照大神の遙宮), or external branches of the Inner Shrine of the Ise Grand Shrine.

== Enshrined kami ==
The kami enshrined at Izawa-no-miya is:

- Amaterashimasusume-Ōkami-no-Mitama (天照坐皇大御神御魂), one of the mitama of the Sun Goddess

== History ==
The origins of the Izawa-no-miya are unknown. According to the spurious Kamakura period Yamatohime Seki (倭姫命世記), the shrine was founded by PrincessYamato, the daughter of Emperor Suinin and first saiō of the Ise Grand Shrine, who sought a place of sacrifice further east from Ise, and this was the only land in the area with rice fields. While this legend is unsupported, the earliest mention of the shrine is in the 804 Kotai Jingu Ceremony Book (皇太神宮儀式帳, Kōtaijingū Gishikichō) and the 927 Engishiki records. The shrine was looted and burned down by forces from Kumano shrine during the Genpei War in 1180. During the Edo Period, the priests of this shrine forged a document attempting the "prove" that their shrine was the original Ise Grand Shrine and that the existing Ise Grand Shrine was an imposter. During the Meiji period era of State Shinto, the shrine was regarded as a part of Ise Grand Shrine and was not given a rank under the Modern system of ranked Shinto Shrines.

The sacred rice planting ceremony held annually on June 24 is considered to be one of Japan's three major rice planting festivals, along with Katori Jingu and Sumiyoshi Taisha. The ceremony became a National Important Intangible Folk Cultural Property in 1990.

The shrine is located a five-minute walk from Kaminogō Station on the Kintetsu Shima Line.

== Cultural Properties ==
=== National Intangible Cultural Folk Properties ===
- Isobe no Omita rice planting festival (磯部の御神田)

== Gallery ==
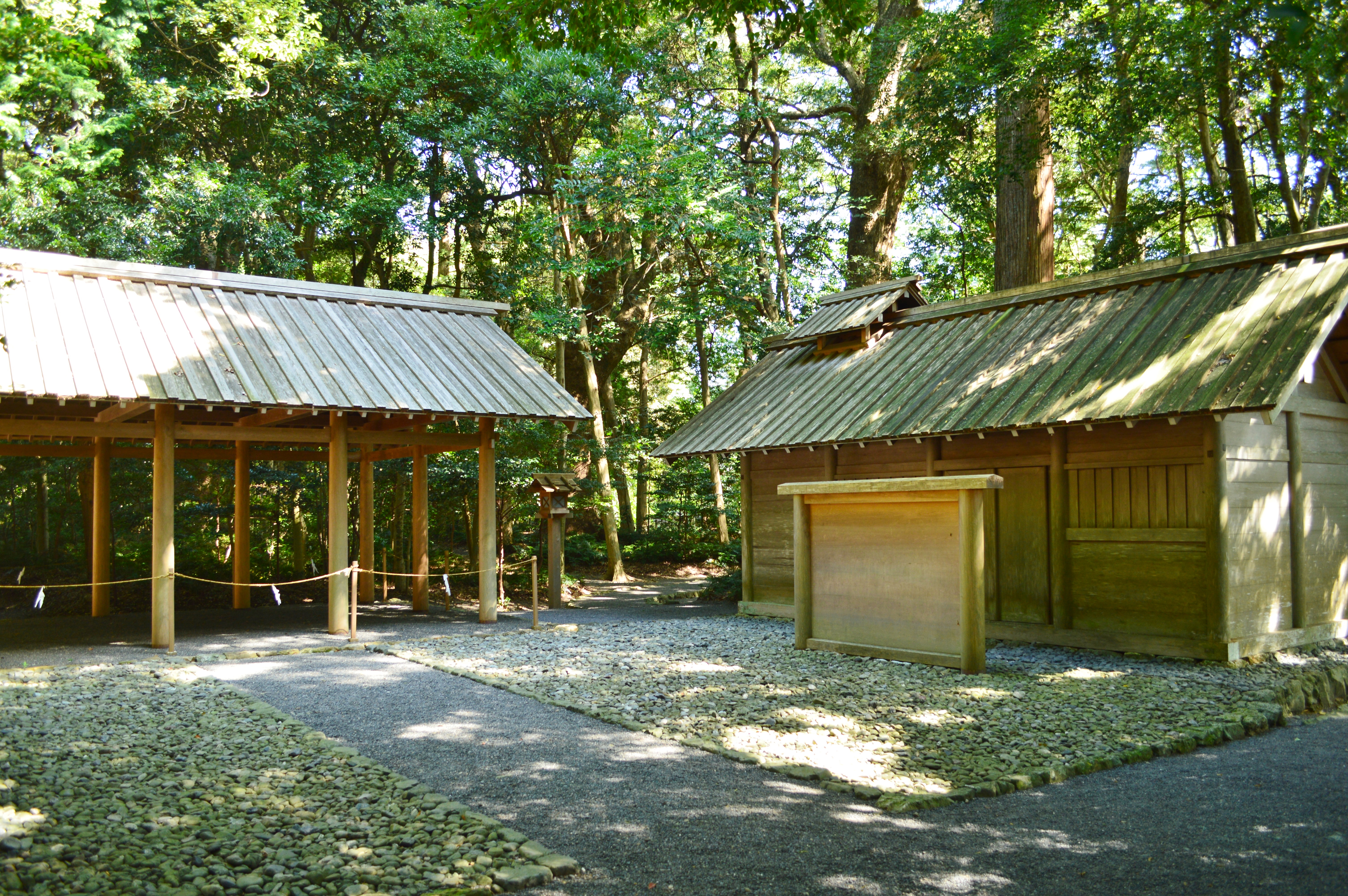
Purification spot

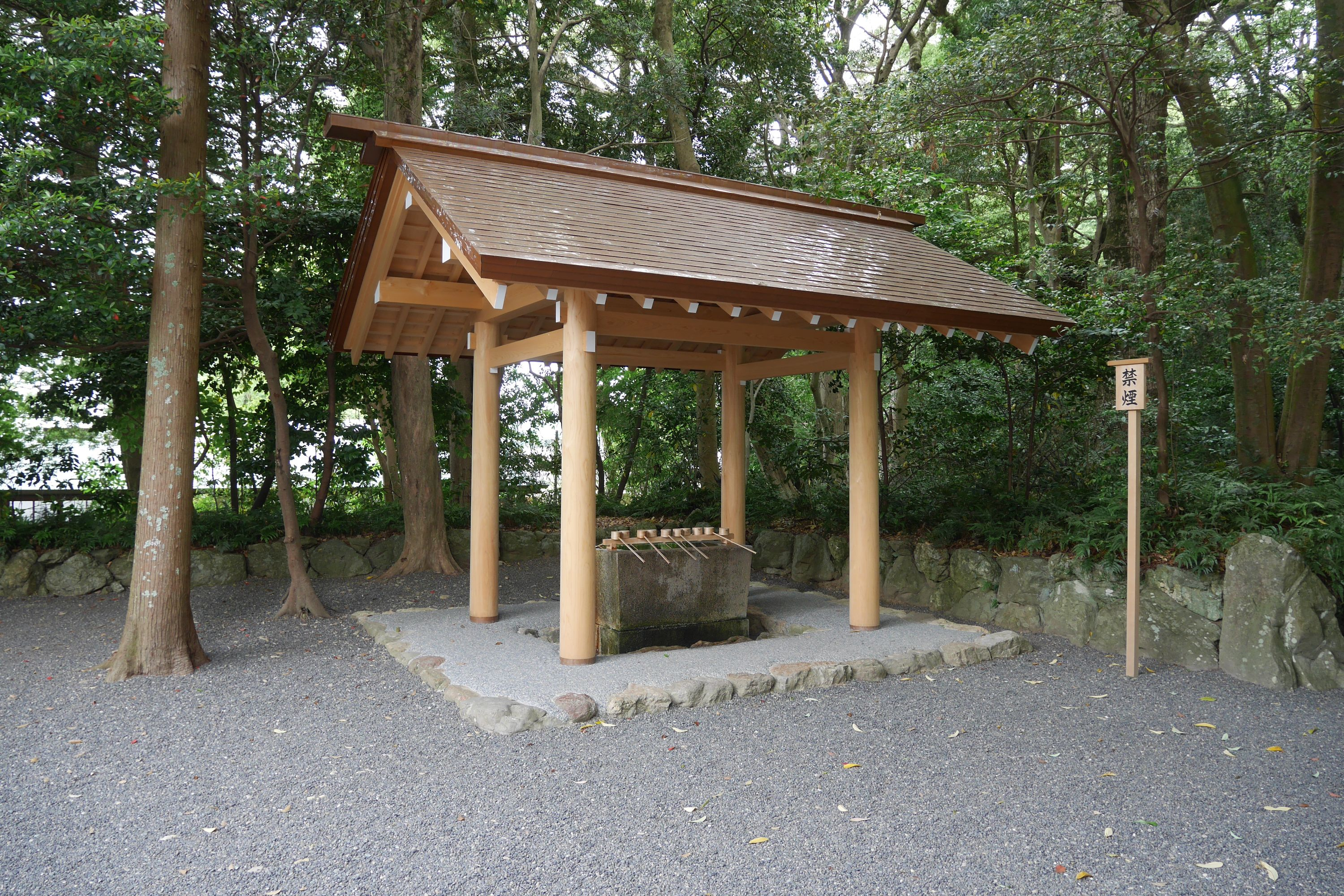
Ablution font

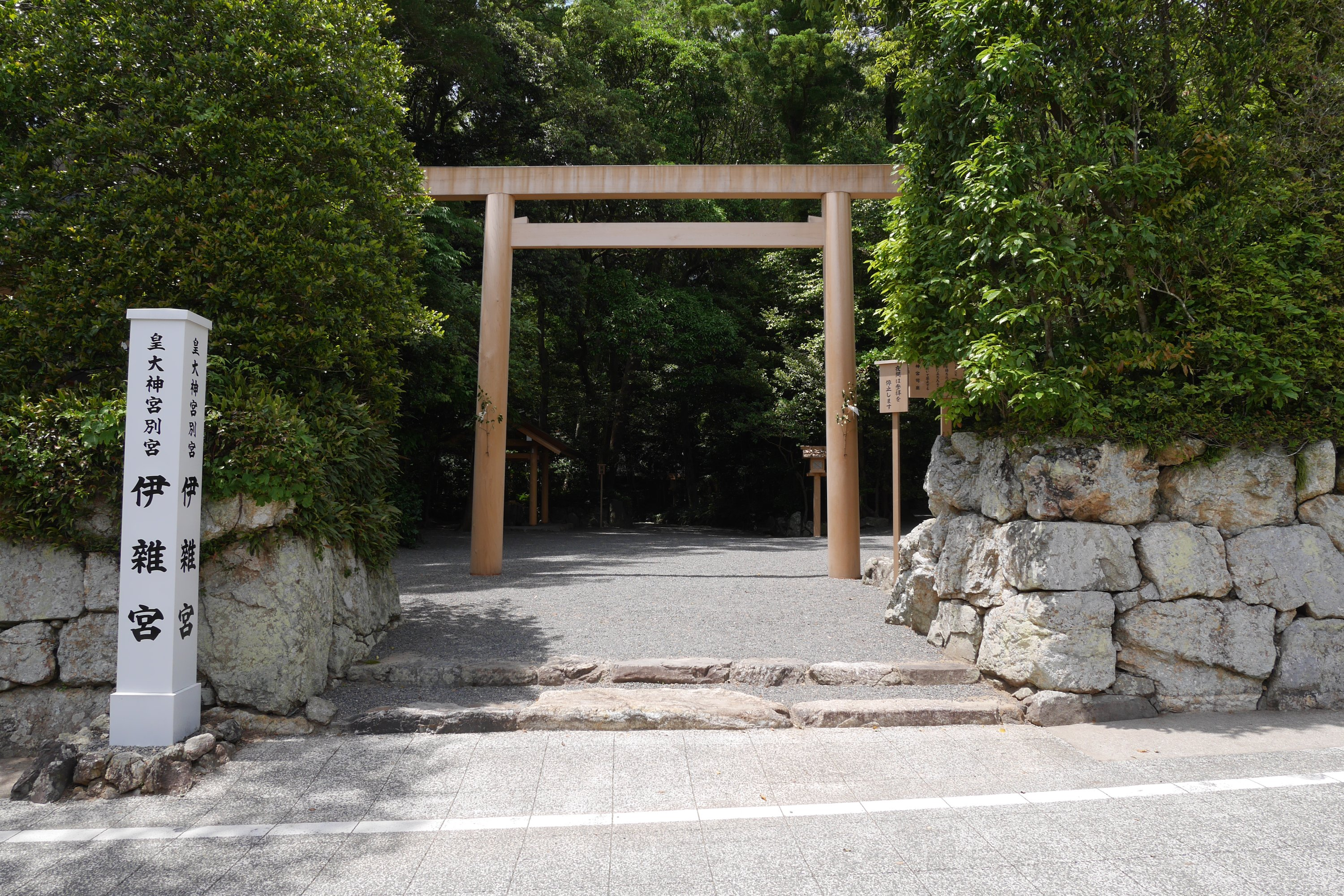
Torii

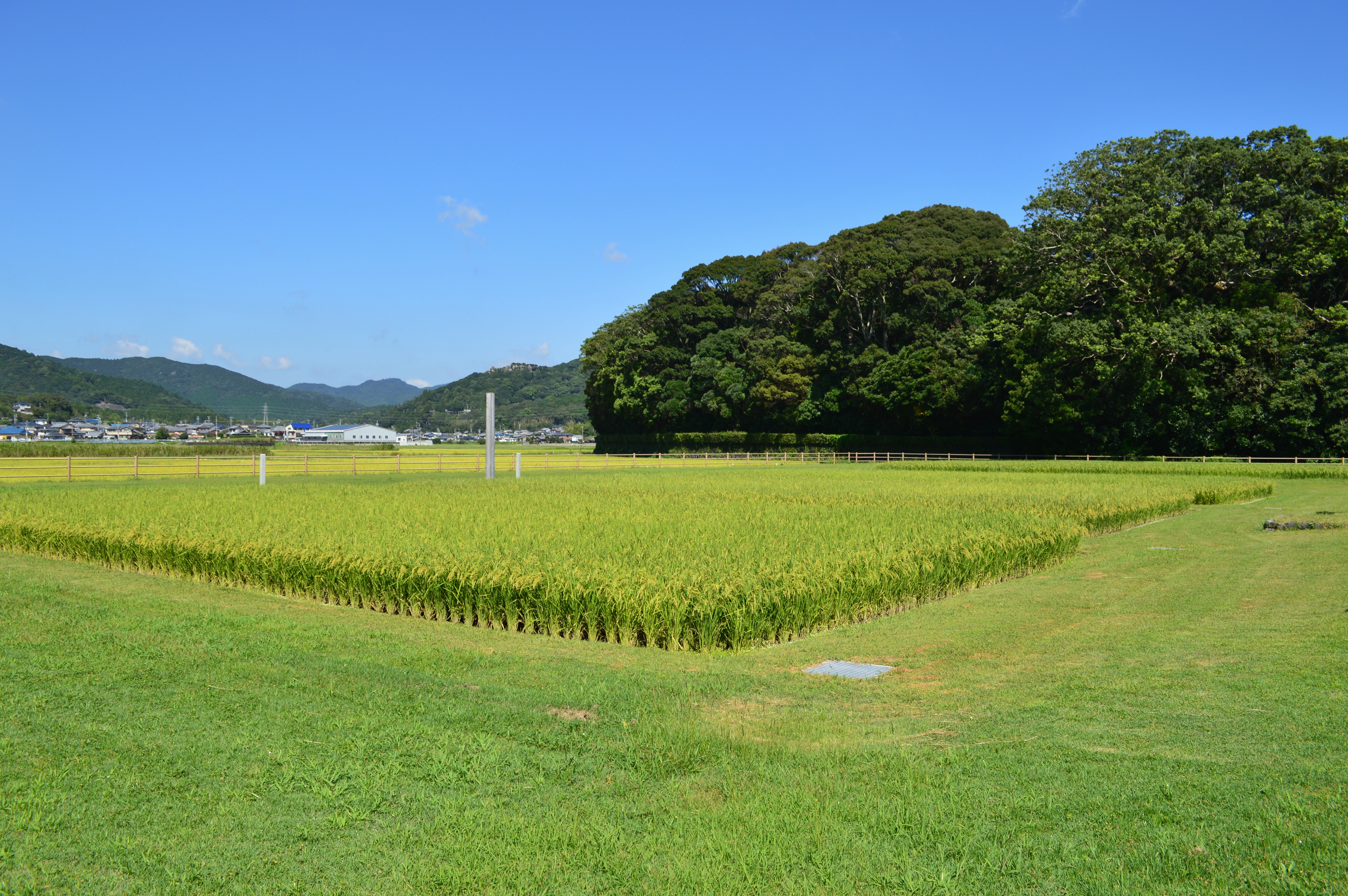
Sacred rice fields

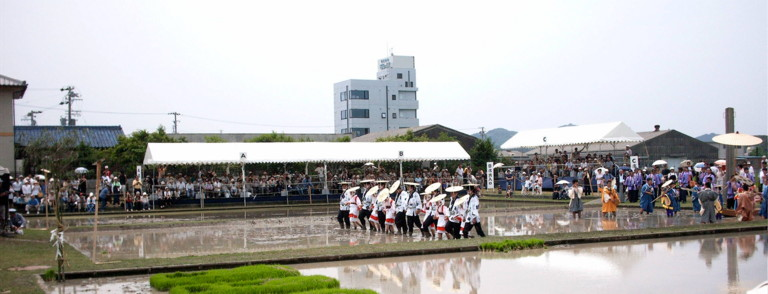
Rice Planting festival

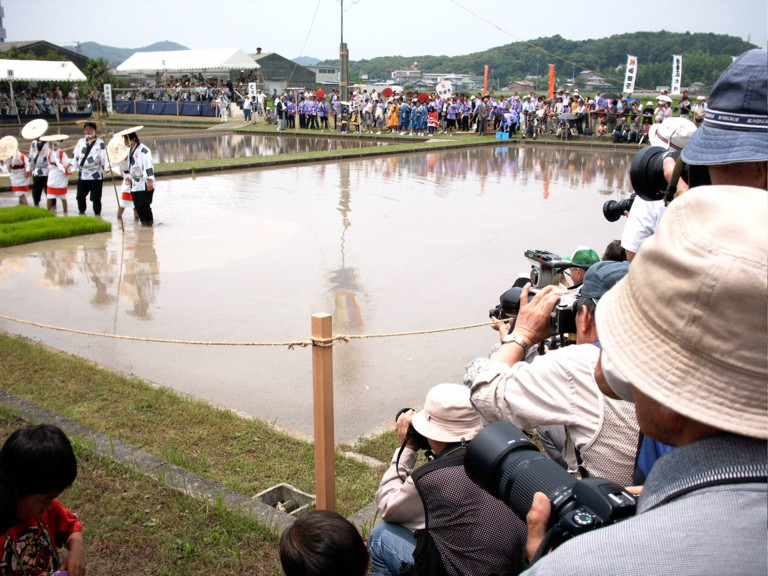
Rice Planting festival

== See also ==
- List of Shinto shrines
- List of Important Intangible Folk Cultural Properties
- Ichinomiya
- Saminaga Shrine
