= Kannamesai Festival =

Japanese festival

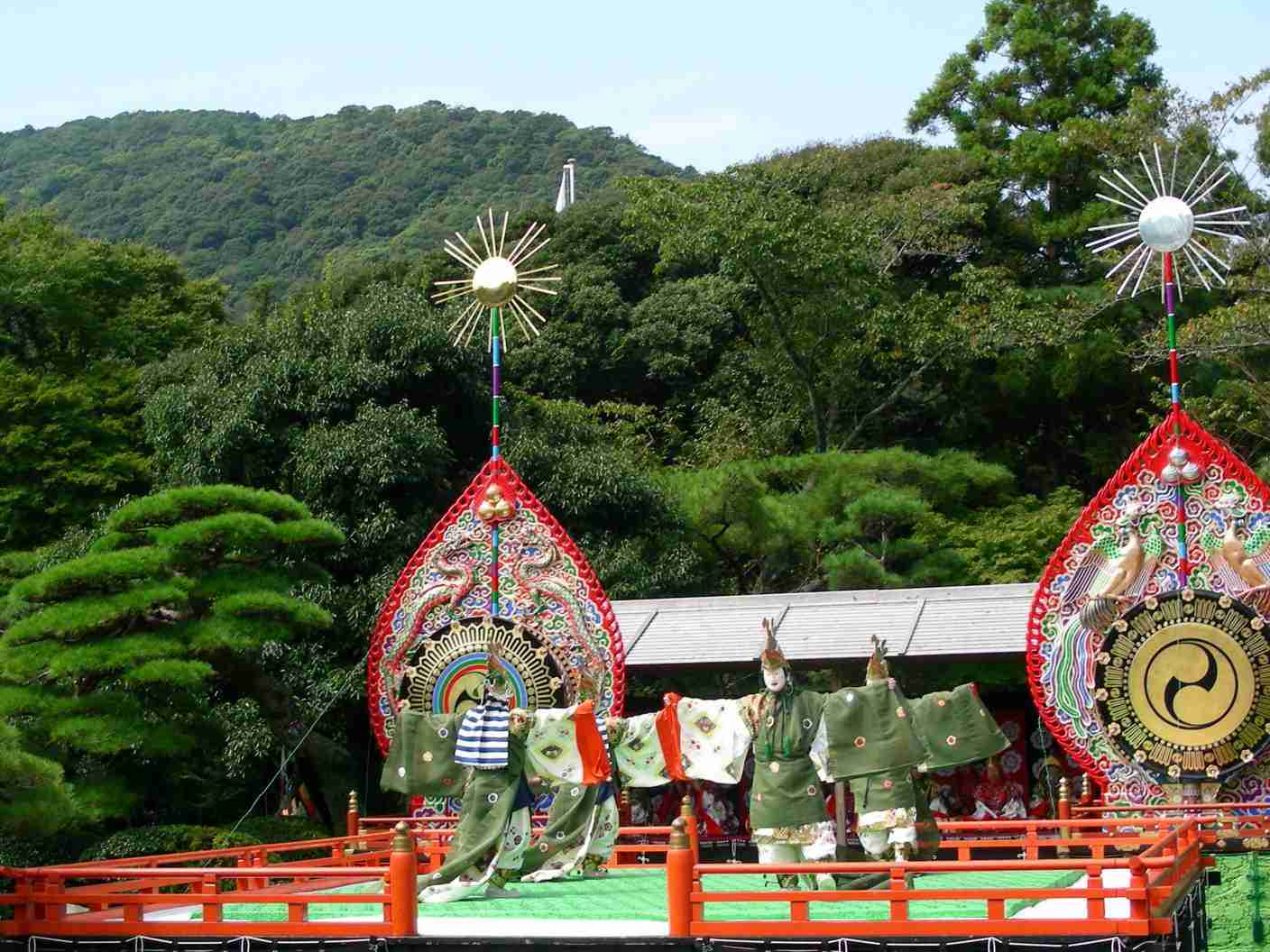
Autumn Kagura Festival.

Kannamesai Festival, sometimes called Ōmatsuri is one of the most important festivals of Ise Jingu. Held October 15-17 each year, this ritual makes offerings of the first harvest of crops for the season to Amaterasu. An imperial envoy carries the offering of rice harvested by the Emperor himself to Ise, as well as five-coloured silk cloths and other materials, called heihaku (幣帛).

The festival is the culmination of a cycle of festivals that take place throughout the year, beginning in April with the Shinden Geshusai (神田下種祭) which sees the sowing of the rice seeds. This is followed by Otaue Hajime (御田植初) where seedlings are transplanted in May, harvest at the Nuibosai (抜穂祭) in September, and finally, the Kannamesai.

== Overview ==
Kannamesai is one of the three seasonal festivals held throughout year.

The festival is held before the Niinamesai at the Imperial Palace and follows the lunar calendar, taking place in the ninth lunar month and includes an imperial envoy carrying offerings of silk and other gifts.

== Rituals and Ceremonies ==
The festival begins on the evening of October 15 with the Okitama-no-kami-sai (興玉神祭) in which a guardian kami of the shrine, Okitama, is invoked. This is followed by the Miura (御卜), a divination ritual to determine if any of the clergy participating in the festival are impure, rendering them unfit to participate. The clergy then present yuki-no-ōmike (由貴大御饌), edible offerings in the form of fish, vegetables, water, and sake, followed by the presenting of heihaku offerings by an imperial envoy, and the rituals are completed with a kagura dance. These rituals are largely repeated twice for each of the Inner and Outer Shrines, once in the evening and once the following morning.

During the festival, the Emperor performs distance worship (御遙拝, goyōhai) at the Shinkaden (神嘉殿), a hall in the Imperial Palace.

== History ==
The festival may have its roots in the legend from Emperor Suinin's time in which Princess Yamatohime-no-mikoto looked for a place to enshrine the Imperial Family's ancestral spirits during which she made an offering of rice stalks in the beak of a white-naped crane.

This became a true festival in 721 when Empress Genshō sent offerings called reihei (例幣) to Ise Shrine in the ninth month of the lunar calendar. The practice stopped in the Middle Ages but restarted during the Edo period. After Japan adopted the Gregorian calendar in 1873, the ninth month no longer aligned with the harvest season of rice, and the Kannamesai was moved to October in 1879 to compensate.

According to the Jingiryō, the messenger (hōbeishi) charged with carrying the imperial offerings was required to hold the fifth court rank or higher and was traditionally selected by divination; from the medieval period onward, this messenger for the Kannamesai came to be specifically termed the reiheishi. The practice of dispatching a reiheishi to Ise is first attested in 721, but was suspended during the Ōnin War (1467–1477) and only revived in 1647, during the Edo period. In 1871, an imperial edict on the Kashiko dokoro established that the Kannamesai would be marked annually with a formal rite (haishiki) at the Inner Shrine (Kōtai Jingū) and with distance worship (yōhai) performed within the imperial palace, in recognition that the Kashiko dokoro, dedicated to the sacred mirror (Yata no Kagami), was considered spiritually linked to the Ise Shrine. The rite was subsequently codified in Article 14 of the Kōshitsu Saishi Ryō (Ordinance on Imperial House Rites), under which the Kannamesai has since been celebrated simultaneously at Ise and within the imperial palace's Kashiko dokoro.
