= Ise Shrine =

Shinto shrine in Japan

- 伊勢神宮 (Ise Jingū)
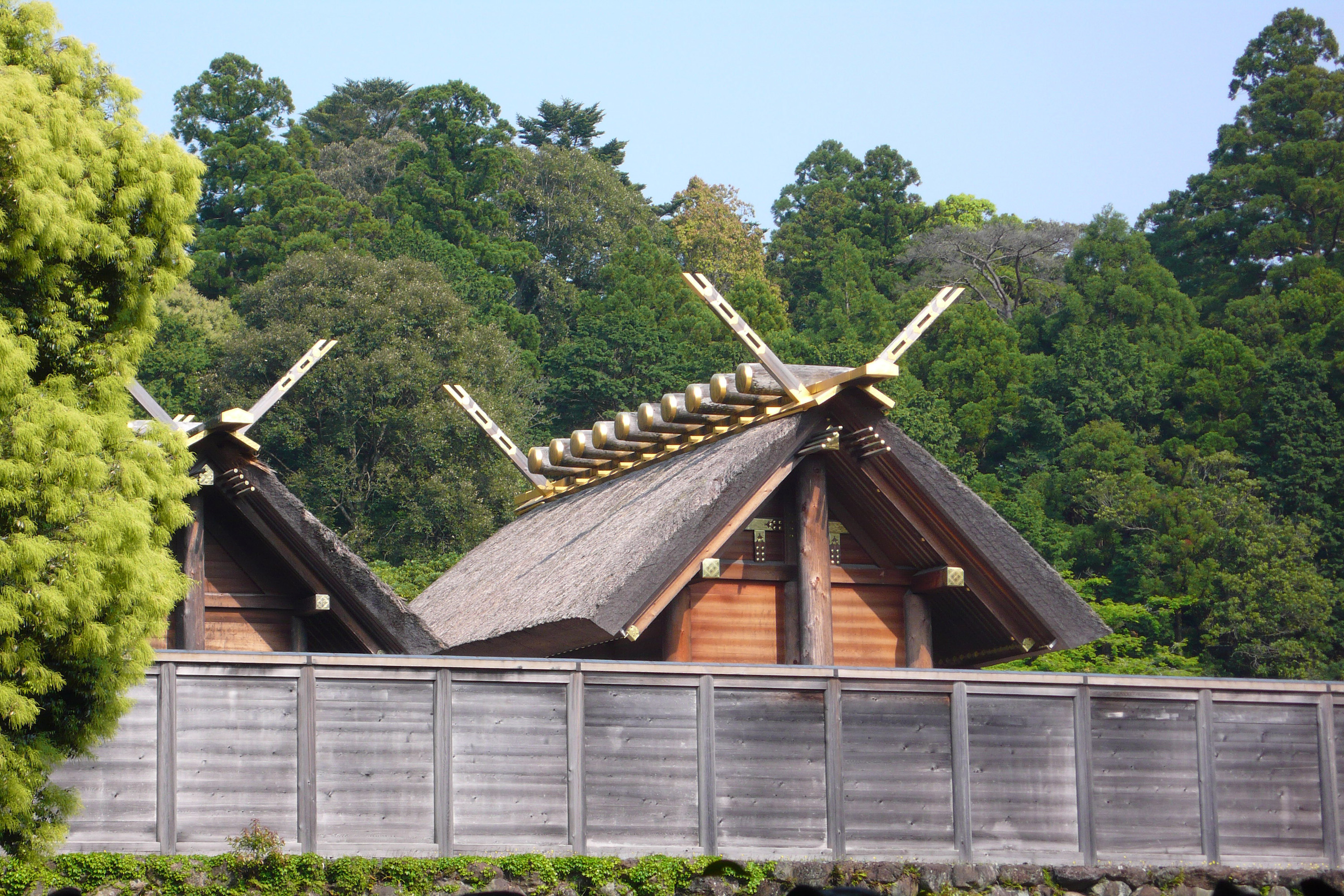
- Naikū, Ise Shrine

- Location within Japan

Religion
- Affiliation: Shinto
- Deity: Amaterasu

Location
- Location: Ise, Mie Prefecture, Japan
- Interactive map of Ise Shrine
- Coordinates: 34°27′18″N 136°43′33″E

Architecture
- Style: Shinmei zukuri
- Established: 4 BCE (according to legend)

The Ise Shrine (Japanese: 伊勢神宮, Hepburn: Ise Jingū), located in Ise, Mie Prefecture of Japan, is a Shinto shrine dedicated to the solar goddess Amaterasu Ōmikami and the grain goddess Toyouke-hime. Also known simply as Jingū (神宮), Ise Shrine is a shrine complex composed of many Shinto shrines centered on two main shrines, Naikū (内宮) and Gekū (外宮).

The Inner Shrine, Naikū (also officially known as "Kōtai Jingū"), is dedicated to the worship of Amaterasu and is located in the town of Uji-tachi, south of central Ise, where she is believed to dwell. The shrine buildings are made of solid cypress wood and use no nails, instead being joined with wood. The Outer Shrine or Gekū (also officially known as the Toyouke Daijingū), is located about six kilometers from Naikū and dedicated to Toyouke-hime, the female deity of agriculture, rice harvest and industry. Besides Naikū and Gekū, there are an additional 123 Shinto shrines in Ise City and the surrounding areas, 91 of them connected to Naikū and 32 to Gekū.

Purportedly the home of the Yata no Kagami, the shrine is Shinto's holiest and most important site. Access to both sites is strictly limited, with the general public not allowed beyond sight of the thatched roofs of the central structures, hidden behind four tall tamagaki (wooden fences). However, visitors are free to roam the forest, including its ornamental walkways, which date back to the Meiji period.

During the Edo period, it is estimated that one in ten Japanese people made the Okage mairi or pilgrimage to Ise. Accordingly, pilgrimage to the shrine flourished in both commercial and religious frequency. According to historical documents, 3.62 million people visited the shrine in 50 days in 1625, and 1.18 million in three days in 1829, when the grand festival, held every 20 years, took place. Because the shrine is considered sanctuary, no security checkpoints were conducted, as it was considered sacrilege by the faithful. The two main shrines of Ise are joined by a pilgrimage road that passes through the old entertainment district of Furuichi.

The chief priest or priestess of Ise, called the Saiō until the 14th century, must be related to the Imperial House of Japan and is responsible for watching over the Shrine. The current High Priestess of the shrine is former princess Sayako Kuroda, daughter of Akihito, the current Daijō Tennō (retired emperor).

== Establishment of the Shrine ==
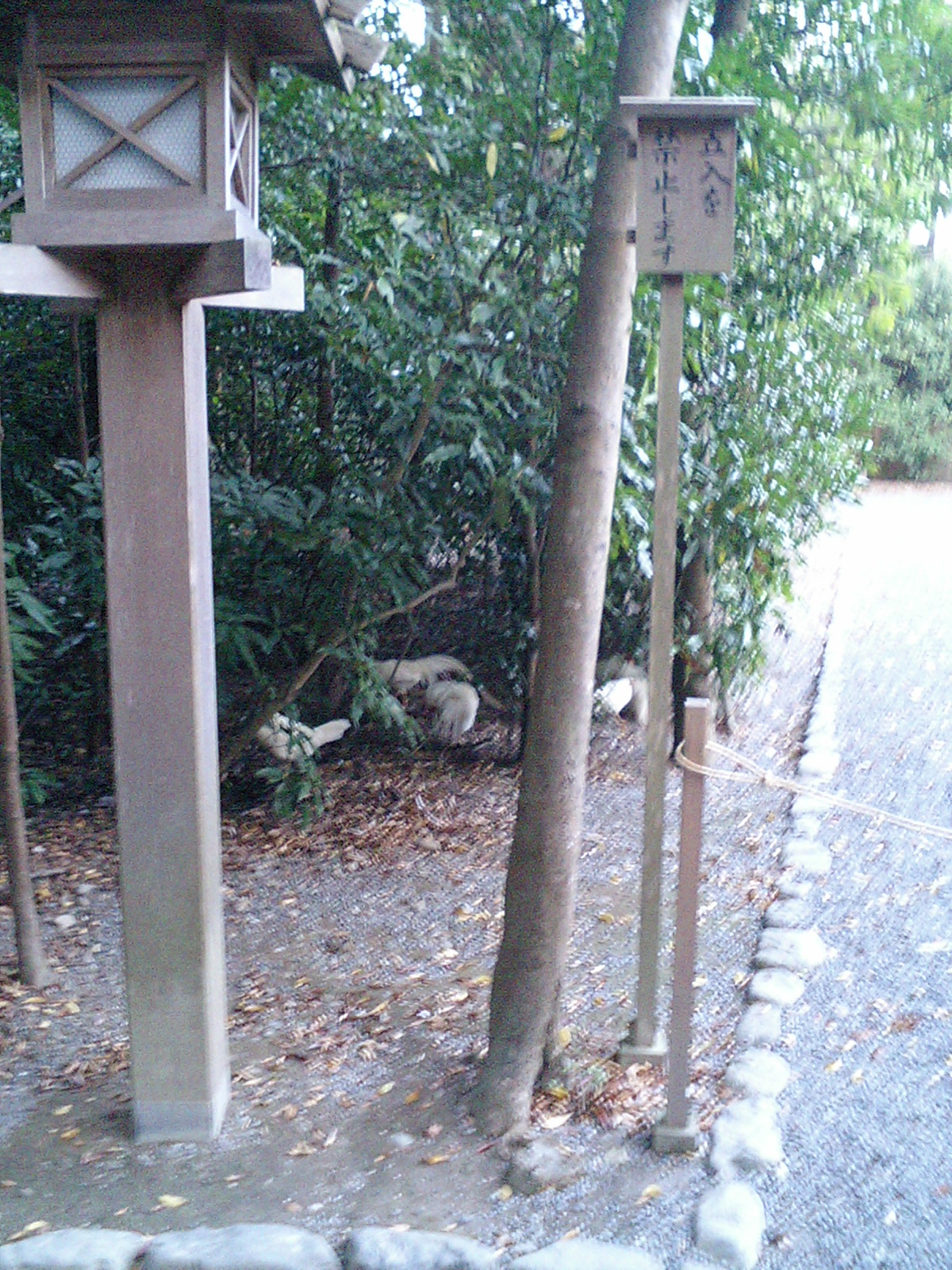
Free-range chickens roaming the grounds, considered to be the divine messengers of Amaterasu

According to the Nihon Shoki, around 2000 years ago the divine Yamatohime-no-mikoto, daughter of the Emperor Suinin, set out from Mount Miwa in what is now Nara Prefecture in search of a permanent location to worship Amaterasu, the tutelary deity of the Yamato Kingship, wandering for 20 years through the regions of Omi and Mino. Her search eventually brought her to Ise, in modern Mie Prefecture, where she is said to have established the Naikū after hearing the voice of Amaterasu saying, "(Ise) is a secluded and pleasant land. In this land I wish to dwell."

Before Yamatohime-no-mikoto's journey, Amaterasu had been worshiped at the imperial residence in Yamato, then briefly at Kasanui in the eastern Nara basin. When Princess Yamatohime-no-mikoto arrived at the village of Uji-tachi, she set up fifty bells to designate the area as enshrined for the goddess Amaterasu, which is why the river is called the Isuzu, or "fifty bells".

The Gekū was founded after Emperor Yūryaku dreamt of Amaterasu. She said she was unable to get food, and asked him to bring Toyouke-hime from Tanba to help her with food.

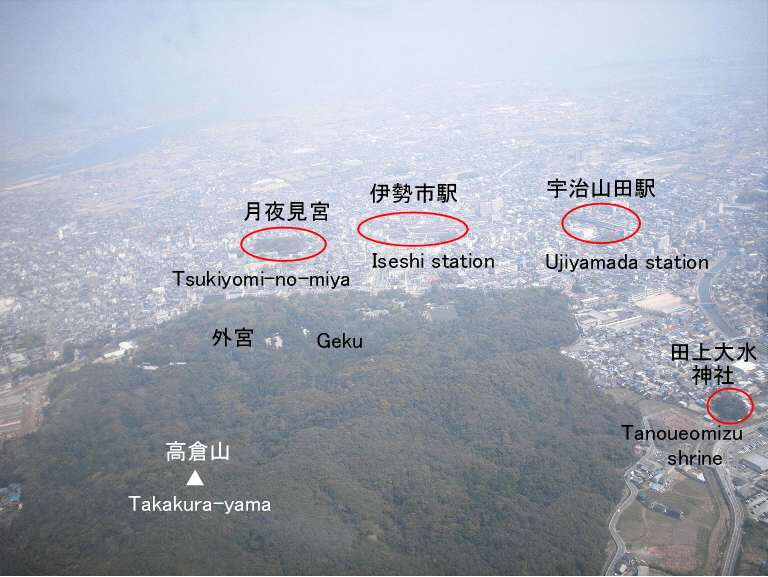
Bird's eye view of the area surrounding the Gekū shrine

Besides the traditional establishment date of 4 BC, other dates of the 3rd and 5th centuries have been put forward for the establishment of the Naikū and Gekū, respectively. The first shrine building at Naikū was erected by Emperor Tenmu (678–686), with the first ceremonial rebuilding being carried out by his wife, Empress Jitō, in 692.

The shrine was foremost among a group of shrines which became objects of imperial patronage in the early Heian period. In 965, Emperor Murakami ordered imperial messengers to be sent to report important events to the guardian kami of Japan. These heihaku were initially presented to 16 shrines, including Ise Shrine.

== Chief priestess / chief priest ==
From the late 7th century until the 14th century, the role of chief priestess of Ise Shrine was carried out by a female member of the Imperial House of Japan known as a Saiō. According to the Man'yōshū, the first saiō to serve at the shrine was Princess Ōku, daughter of Emperor Tenmu, during the Asuka period. Mention of Ise Shrine's saiō is also made in the Aoi, Sakaki and Yugao chapters of The Tale of Genji as well as in the 69th chapter of The Tales of Ise. The saiō system ended during the turmoil of the Nanboku-chō period.

During the Empire of Japan and the establishment of State Shinto, the position of chief priest of the Ise Shrine was fulfilled by the reigning emperor and the Meiji, Taisho and Shōwa Emperors all played the role of chief priest during their reigns.

Since the disestablishment of State Shinto during the Occupation of Japan, the offices of chief priest and most sacred priestess have been held by former members of the imperial family or their descendants. The current chief priest of the shrine is Takatsukasa Naotake, adoptive son of Takatsukasa Kazuko. He succeeded Kitashirakawa Michihisa, a great-grandson of Emperor Meiji, in 2007. Kitashirakawa Fusako, the daughter of Emperor Meiji, served as the chief priestess until 1974, when she was succeeded by her niece, Takatsukasa Kazuko. Takatsukasa was succeeded by her younger sister, Ikeda Atsuko, in 1988. In 2012, Ikeda was joined by her niece Sayako Kuroda, sole daughter of Emperor Akihito, to serve as a high priestess under her. On 19 June 2017, Kuroda officially replaced her aunt as supreme priestess.

== Shrine architecture ==
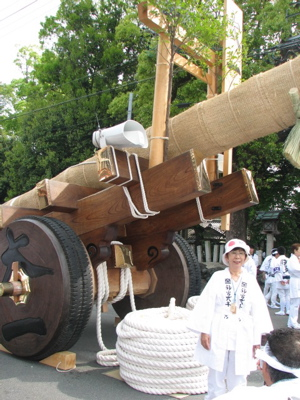
Okihiki Festival in May 2007, exhibiting wood to build the next shrine

The architectural style of the Ise shrine is known as shinmei-zukuri, characterized by extreme simplicity and antiquity; its basic principles date back to the Kofun period (250–538 C.E.). The shrine buildings use a special variant of this style called yuitsu-shinmei-zukuri (唯一神明造), which may not be used in the construction of any other shrine. Yuitsu-shinmei-zukuri style replicates the architectural features of early rice granaries. The old shrines are dismantled and new ones built on an adjacent site to exacting specifications every 20 years at exorbitant expense, so that the buildings will be forever new and forever ancient and original. The present buildings, dating from 2013, are the 62nd iteration to date and are scheduled for rebuilding in 2033.

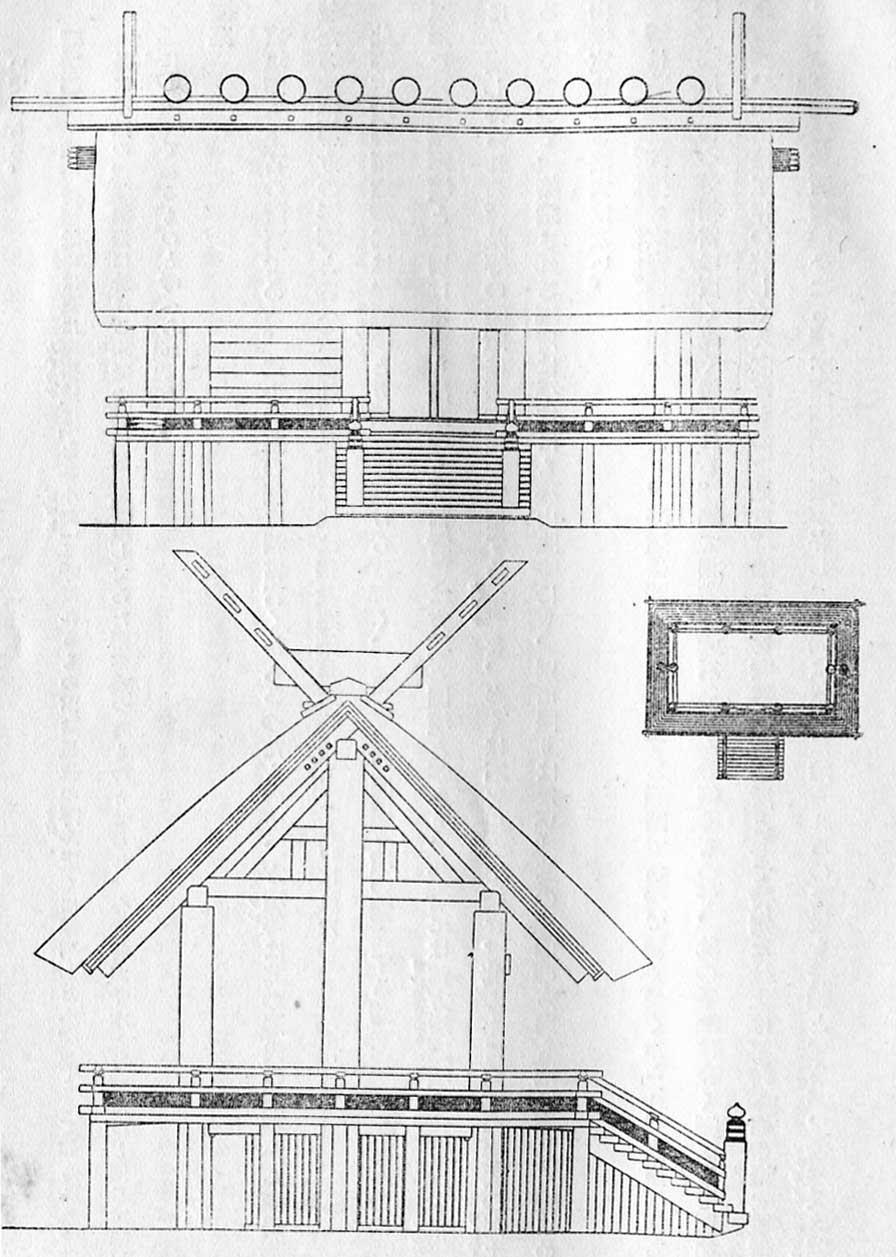
Main shrine building, Naiku

The shrine at Naikū is constructed of Japanese cypress. Built on pillars set directly in the ground, the shrine building measures 10.9 by 5.5 meters and includes a raised floor, verandas all the way around the building and a staircase leading to a single central doorway. The Naikū does not have any windows. The roof is made of thatched reed with ten billets (katsuogi) located on the ridge of the roof, the bargeboards of which project beyond the roof to form the distinctive forked finials (chigi) at the ends of the ridge. The chigi on the roof of the Naikū are flat on top, rather than pointed, which serves as a distinction for the gender of the deity being represented. In the case of Ise, Amaterasu, a female deity, is represented at the shrine, which is why the chigi are flat. The roof ridge is supported by two free-standing columns called the munamochi-bashira. The katsuogi, chigi and munamochi-bashira are stylised forms of older storehouse building techniques that pre-date the introduction of Buddhist architecture in Japan.

The empty site beside the shrine building, the site where the previous shrine once stood and where the next will be built, is called the kodenchi. This area is strewn with large white pebbles and is left totally empty apart from the oi-ya, a small wooden hut containing a wooden pole a little over 2 metres in height called the shin-no-mihashira (new sacred central pole). When a new shrine is built, it is built around the sacred central pole before the removal of the oi-ya, so that the central pole is never seen. The central pole of the old shrine will then have a new oi-ya erected so that the shin-no-mihashira also remains unseen.

The erection of a single post in the center of a sacred area strewn with stones represents the form taken by Japanese places of worship in very ancient times; the shin-no-mihashira would thus be the survival of a symbolism from a very primitive symbolism to the present day.

== Rebuilding the Shrine ==
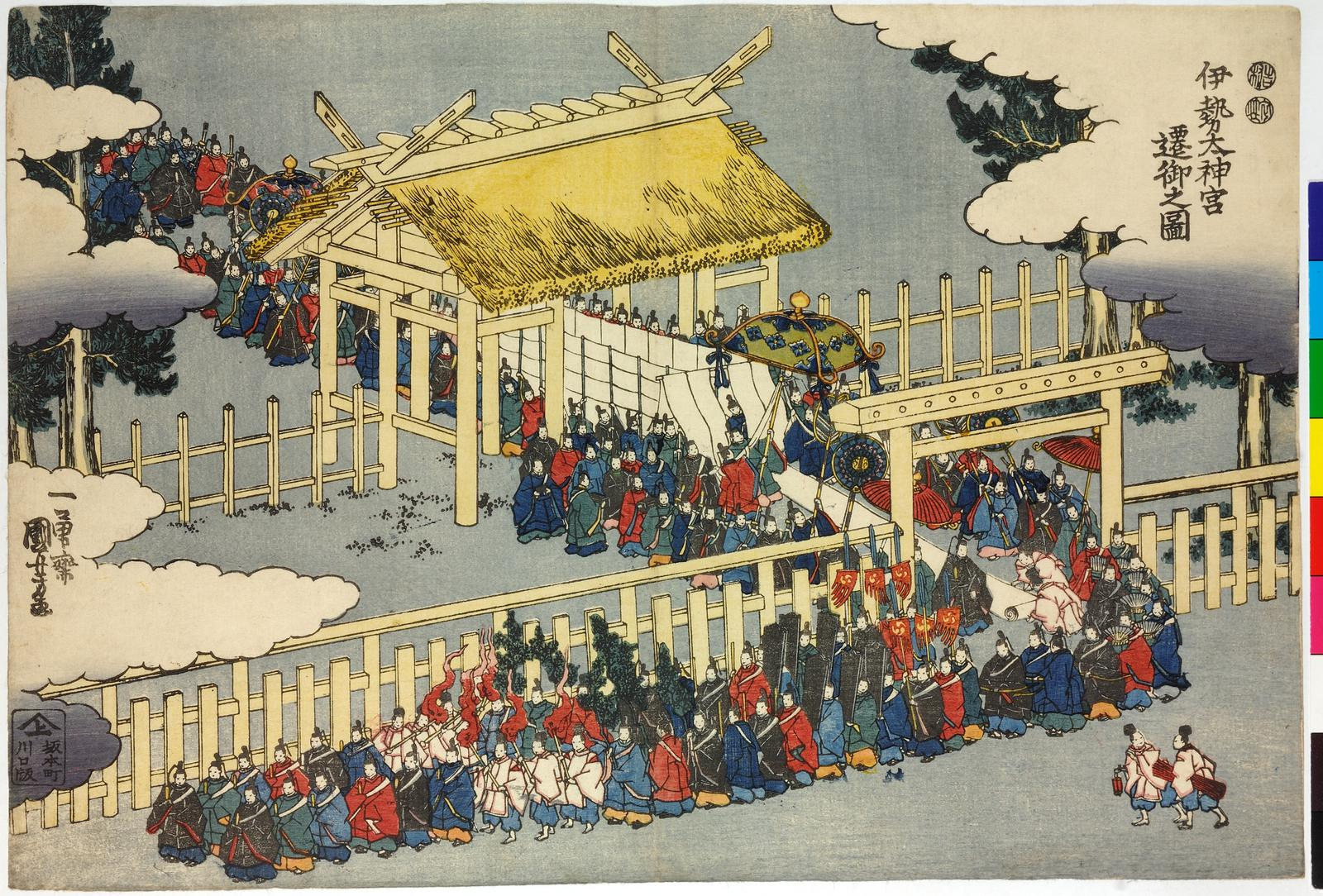
Ukiyo-e depicting the Sengū ceremony (relocation of kami) when it was rebuilt in 1849. by Hiroshige, 1849

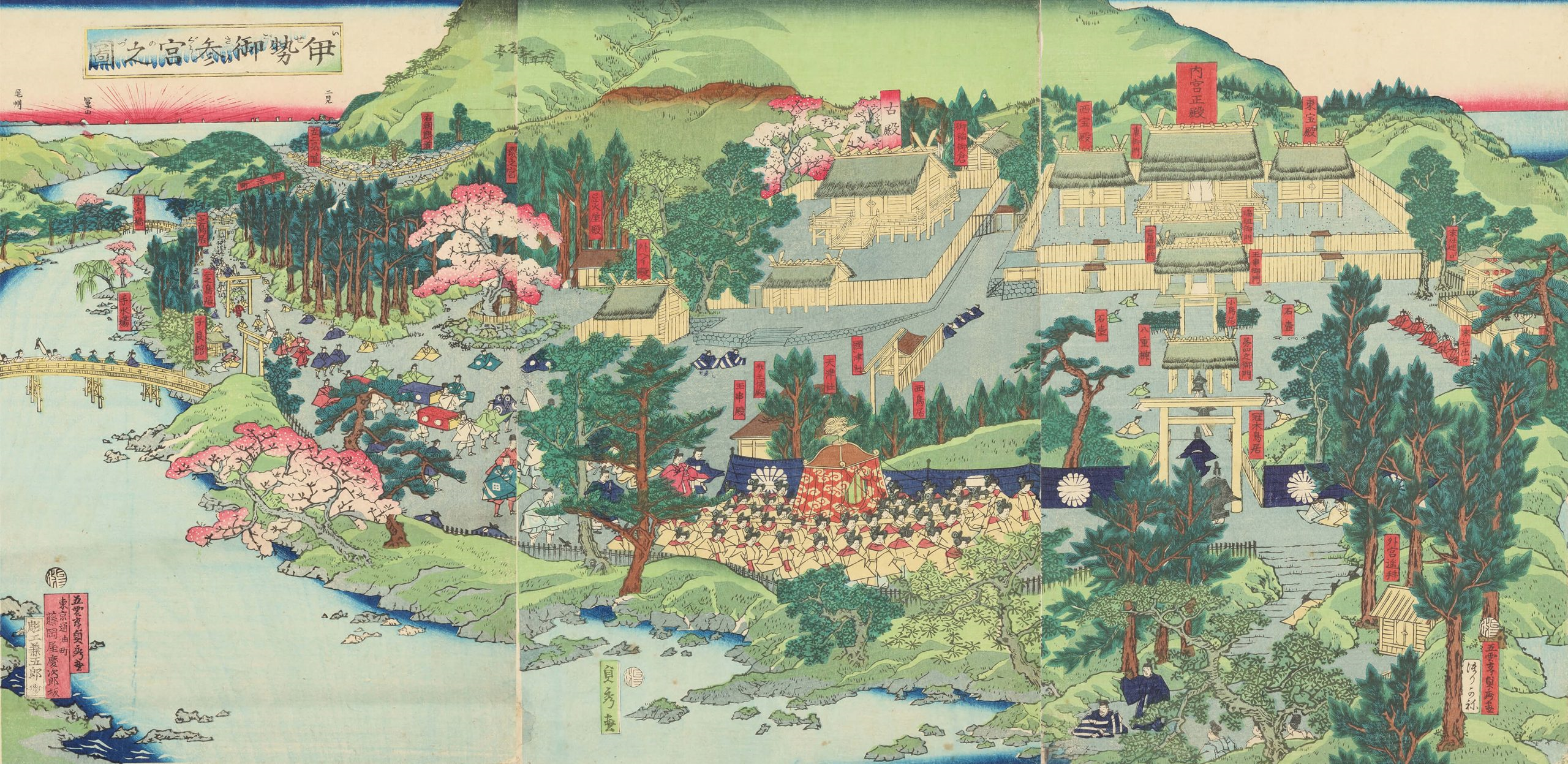
Ise Grand Shrine Ukiyo-e with Emperor Meiji (center) worshipping Ise Jingu on a portable shrine (March 11, 1869)

The shrine buildings at Naikū and Gekū, as well as the Uji Bridge, are rebuilt every 20 years as a part of the Shinto belief in tokowaka (常若), which means renewing objects to maintain a strong sense of divine prestige in pursuit of eternity, and as a way of passing building techniques from one generation to the next. The twenty-year renewal process is called the Shikinen Sengū. Although the goal of Sengū is to get the shrine built within the 20-year period, there have been some instances, especially because of war, where the shrine building process is postponed or delayed. The original physical purpose of the Sengū process is unknown. However, it is believed that it serves to maintain the longevity of the shrine, or possibly as a gesture to the deity enclosed within the shrine. Historically, this cyclical reconstruction has been practiced for many years in various shrines throughout Japan, meaning that it is not a process exclusive to Ise. The entire reconstruction process takes more or less 17 years, with the initial years focusing on project organization and general planning, and the last 8 years focusing on the physical construction of the shrine.

The shrine has evolved throughout the years in its reconstruction, while maintaining some of its key features. The shrine was not originally constructed with gold copper adornments; however, because of advancements in technology as well as Buddhist influence, it gained them over the years. Another example of Buddhist influence on the shrine is the use of Suedama, which are Buddhist orbs seen on various religious structures. It symbolizes a sacred jewel, and is comparable to nyoi-shu, orbs which many Buddhist figures are displayed holding. Initially, the shrine was constructed of locally sourced Hinoki wood, which served as an ideal building material due to its physical properties. The abundance of local Hinoki wood was short lived, and the shrine currently obtains the wood through other domestic producers, who ensure that only the best wood is being used for the construction. Before the wood is usable in building the shrine, it must be put through a lengthy seasoning and drying process where it is in a pond for several years and then dried.

The team which builds the shrine is typically formed around a few factors. Since many of the building techniques haven't changed since the creation of the Ise Shrine, the workers who are hired to build the shrine must be skilled in specific techniques. Power tools are not allowed within the area of the shrine, which means that skilled artisans and carpenters known as miyadaiku are necessary in the construction process. The unit of workers is also organized around relative skill levels, and less experienced workers will work on smaller tasks than more experienced workers. The importance of hiring specifically local artisans has decreased throughout time, for the pool of available miyadaiku has thinned out. Specialized work and the specific materials come with a cost; in 2013, the shrine was built from private donations alone, totaling 57 billion Japanese Yen (US$550 million).

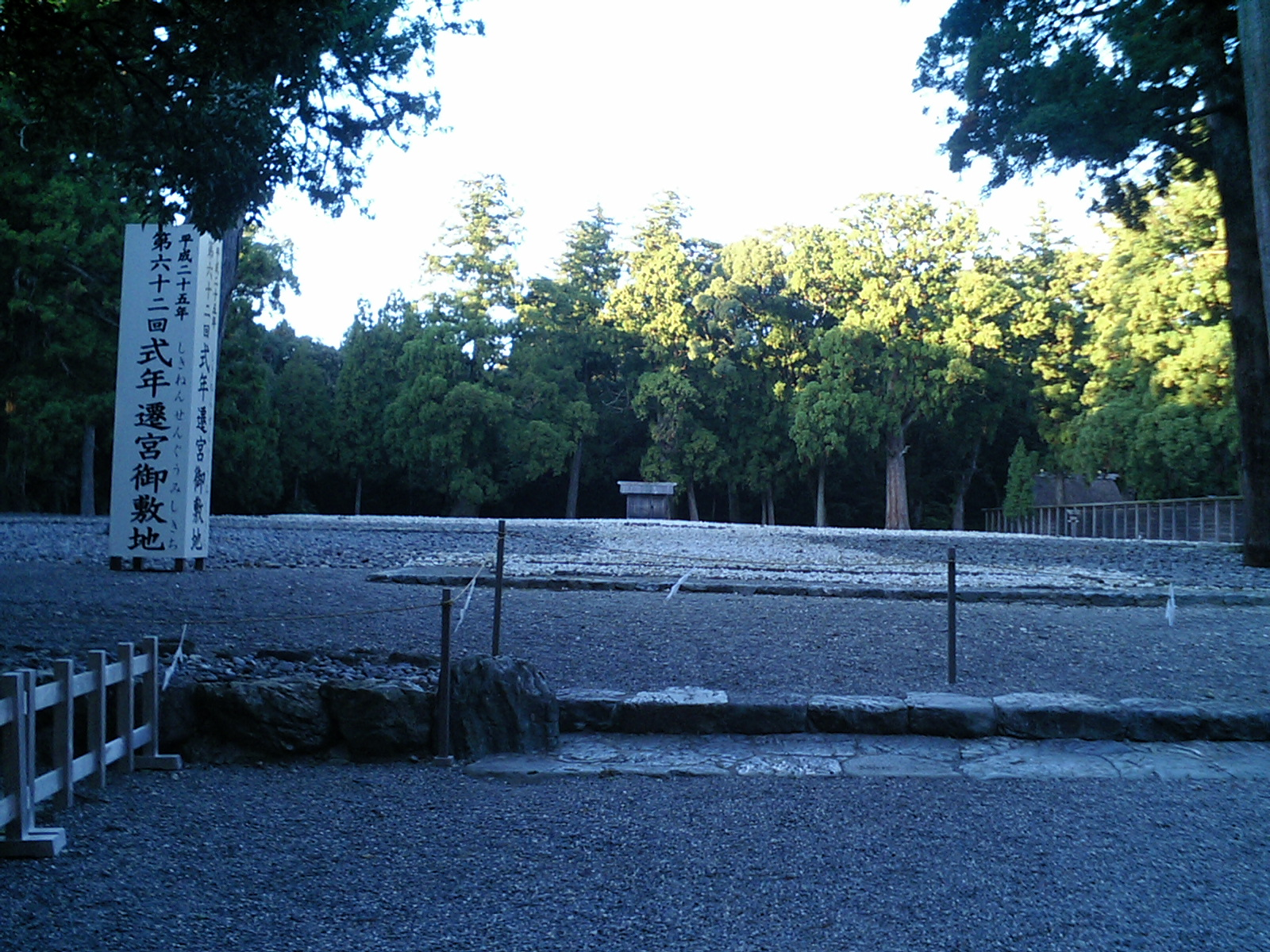
Land before Sengū ceremony, 2005

In August, in a long-standing tradition, the people who live in Ise are allowed to enter the area around the Inner Sanctum of the Naiku as well as the Geku. Some villages drag a wooden carriage laden with white stones up the Isuzu River onto the grounds of the Naiku. Each participant gets two white stones in a white handkerchief and these allow them to place the stones in the area around the Inner Sanctum. Other villages drag a huge wooden cart or Noburi Kuruma laden with white stones to the Uji bridge at the entrance of the grounds of the Naiku. Participants receive two white stones which are also placed in the sacred space around the Inner Sanctum. The entire tradition is called Shiraisshiki and it is very colourful with every participant wearing a happi coat representing a particular village. The rebuilding of the main shrine takes place on a site adjacent to the old, and each rebuilding alternates between the two sites. The next scheduled rebuilding of Naikū is due in 2033 on the lower, northern site. Various other religious ceremonies are held with the completion of the shrine, each serving different purposes.

In the lead-up to the rebuilding of the shrines, a number of festivals are held to mark special events. The Okihiki Festival is held in the spring over two consecutive years and involves people from surrounding towns dragging huge wooden logs through the streets of Ise to Naikū and Gekū. In the lead-up to the 2013 rebuilding, the Okihiki festival was held in 2006 and 2007. A year after the completion of the Okihiki festival, carpenters begin preparing the wood for its eventual use in the Shrine.

== Annual festivals ==
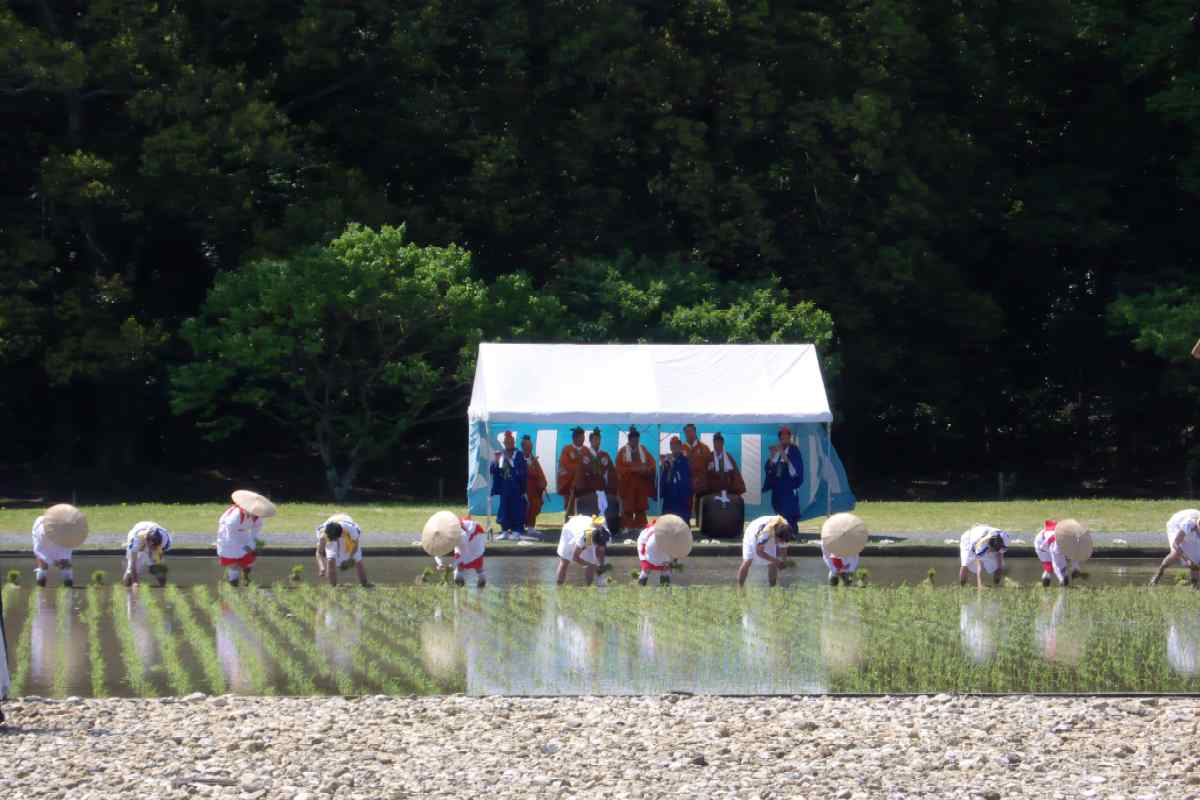
The Otaue ceremony

From the late seventh century, when the festivals and offerings of Ise Shrine became more formalised, a number of annual events have been performed at both Naikū and Gekū. The Tsukinamisai, which was held in June and December, as well as the Kannamesai Festival in September, were the only three offerings performed by the Saiō, an imperial princess who served as high priestess of the shrine until the 14th century. These offerings are based on the cycle of the agricultural year and are still performed today.

The first important ceremony of the modern calendar year is the Kinen-sai, where prayers are offered for a bountiful harvest. Kazahinomisai, where prayers for fair weather and sufficient rains are made, is held twice a year in May and August at both Naikū and Gekū.

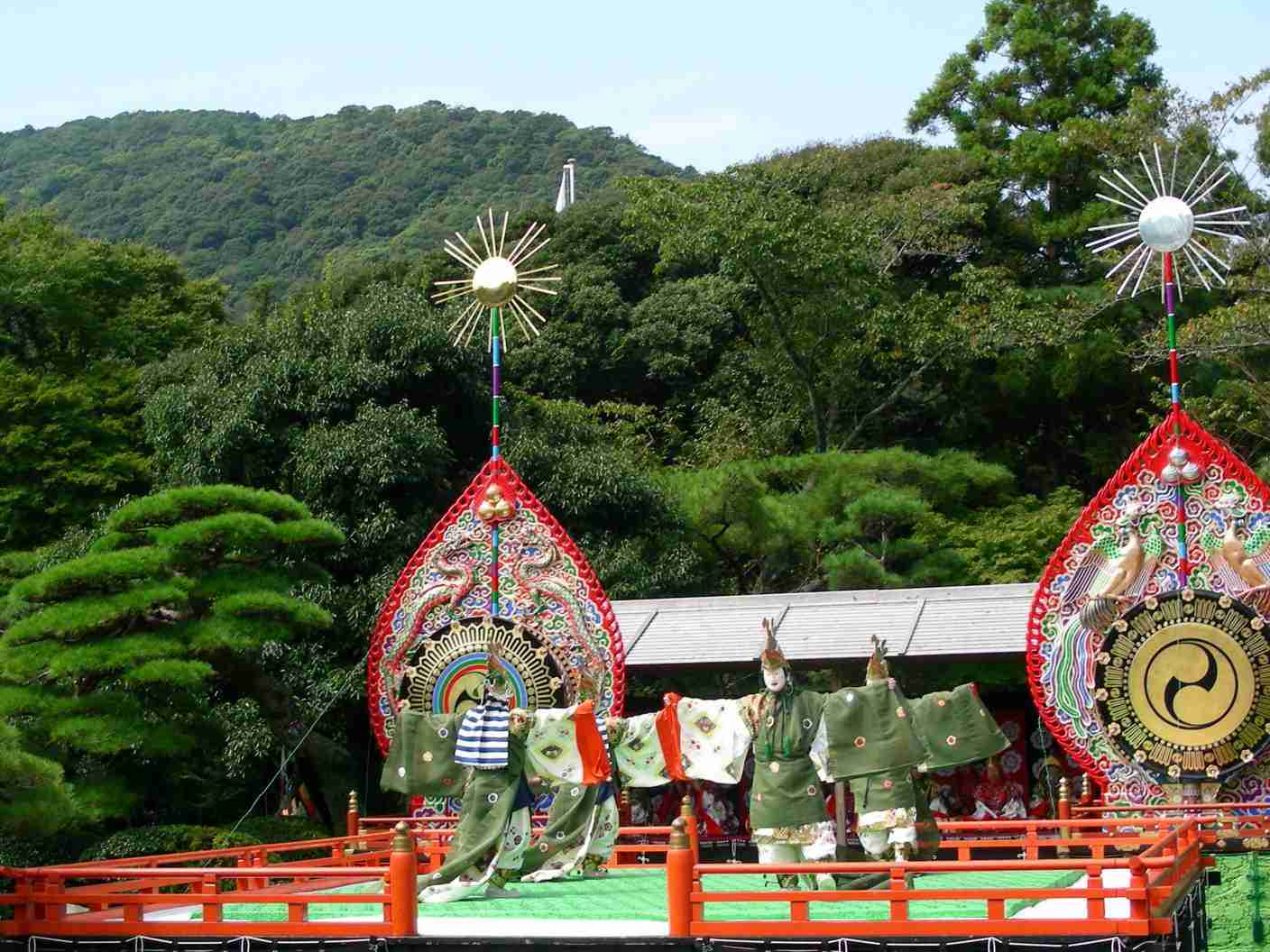
Autumn Kagura Festival

The most important annual festival held at Ise Shrine is the Kannamesai Festival (神嘗祭). Held in October each year, this ritual makes offerings of the first harvest of crops for the season to Amaterasu. An imperial envoy carries the offering of rice harvested by the Emperor himself to Ise, as well as five-coloured silk cloth and other materials, called heihaku.

Besides the agricultural ceremonies already mentioned, ceremonies and festivals are held throughout the year at both Naikū and Gekū to celebrate things such as the new year, the foundation of Japan, the past emperors, purification rituals for priests and court musicians, good sake fermentation and the Emperor's birthday. There are also daily food offerings to the shrine kami held both in the mornings and evenings.

== Gekū – the outer shrine ==
Toyouke Daijingu
- 豊受大神宮 (Toyouke Daijingu)
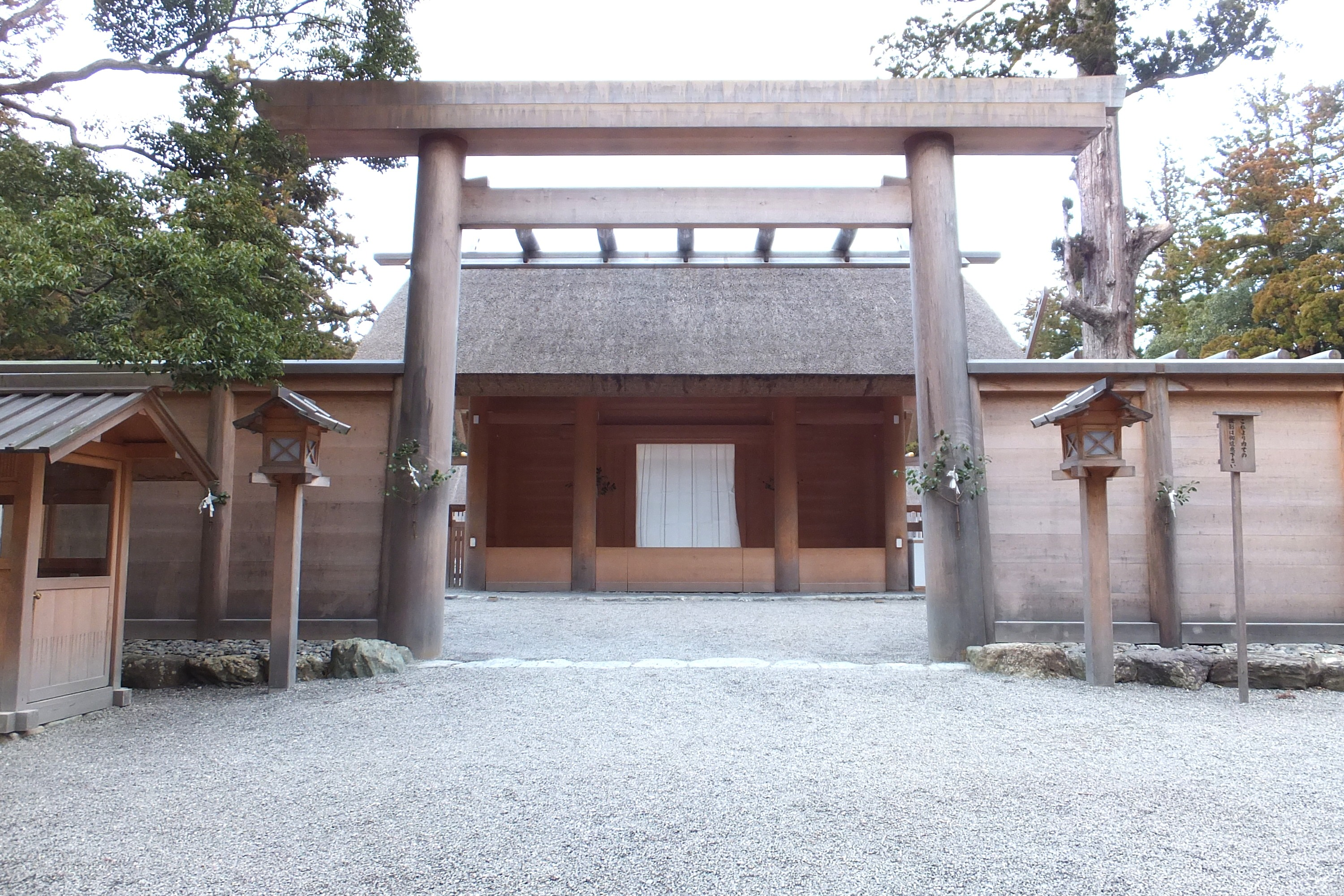

- Location within Japan

Religion
- Affiliation: Shinto
- Deity: Toyouke-hime

Location
- Location: Ise, Mie Prefecture, Japan
- Coordinates: 34°27′18″N 136°43′33″E

Architecture
- Established: 4 BCE

Toyouke Daijingu (豊受大神宮) is a shrine to Toyouke-hime, the food goddess, located in Ise Grand Shrine. it is also colloquially known as the Gekū (外宮; lit. 'Outer shrine'). In pilgrimage customs people traditionally visit this shrine first and then the Naikū, which is located 4 kilometres (2.5 mi) to the south.

The shrine was founded after Emperor Yūryaku dreamt of Amaterasu. She said she was unable to get food and asked him to bring Toyouke-hime from Tanba to help her with food.

=== Daiichi-torii-guchi sandō ===
Daiichi-torii-guchi sandō is the primary route into the shrine. It is a sandō that starts at the Hiyokebashi bridge entrance; beyond the bridge, the Temizusha (ablution font) is visible on the left.

=== Temizusha ===
A chōzuya is present at the shrine for worshippers to purify.

=== Kitamikado-guchi sandō ===
An alternative sandō for the shrine.

=== Saikan and Anzaisho ===
Saikan and Anzaisho are the Purification Hall and Hall for Imperial Household Visitors, respectively. They are on the right side of the pilgrimage path. The Saikan, which is surrounded by fences, is used by Shinto priests to purify themselves. They stay here for one or two nights to cleanse their minds from worldly concerns before performing rituals, as they bathe and eat meals prepared with sacred fire to achieve spiritual serenity; adjacent to Saikan, there is a building called Anzaisho, which serves as the Hall for the Emperor and Empress.

=== Kaguraden ===
There is a large kagura-den at the Geku.

=== Honden ===
Toyouke is enshrined in the honden (sanctuary). It lies in the most sacred area enclosed by four rows of fences, and the structure has remained unchanged for 1500 years. Worshippers can only approach the first gate.

=== History ===
In Japanese mythology, Toyouke-hime was either killed by Tsukuyomi-no-Mikoto (Note: In the Nihon Shoki) or by Susanoo-no-Mikoto. (Note: In the Kojiki) Amaterasu mourned the death of Toyouke-hime and in the Nihon Shoki the reason the sun and the moon are on opposite sides of the sky is that Amaterasu was unwilling to go near Tsukuyomi, the moon god, after he committed the murder.

Amaterasu is linked with Toyouke-hime as the sun is necessary for food to grow. This was prior to the Tenson Korin. Emperor Suinin is said to have established the shrine to worship Amaterasu at a permanent location after many temporary locations. In contrast with Kotai jingu, this shrine is not explicitly mentioned in the Kojiki or the Nihon Shoki.

Besides the traditional establishment date of 4 BC, it has also been proposed that it was made in the 5th century. The shrine officially states it was created 1500 years ago in response to a revelation from Amaterasu that the shrine was needed.

The shrine has been traditionally rebuilt every 20 years.

There is a separate shrine dedicated to Toyouke's ara-mitama, or Toyouke-Ōmikami no Ara-mitama (豊受大御神荒魂) called Takanomiya (Takamiya) inside this shrine.

During the medieval period, priests of the Outer Shrine developed a distinct theological tradition, known as Ise Shintō, or Watarai Shintō after the priestly clan that promoted it, which sought to elevate Toyouke-hime to a status equal to, rather than subordinate to, Amaterasu. Central to this argument was the identification of Toyouke with Ame-no-Minakanushi, the primordial creator deity representing the elemental force of water, whose relationship to the sun deity Amaterasu was expressed through paired equivalences of water and fire, yin and yang, sun and moon; on this basis, Watarai priests held that the two shrines had originally been established jointly and without distinction between them, a doctrine known as nikū ikkō ("the two shrines, one light"). The tradition drew on a core set of texts known as the Shintō gobusho ("Five Books of Shinto"), later expanded and systematized by scholars such as Watarai Ieyuki and, in the Edo period, Deguchi Nobuyoshi.

== Naikū – the inner shrine ==
The official name of the main shrine of Naikū is Kotaijingu (皇大神宮) and is the place of worship of the goddess Amaterasu. The grounds of Naikū contain a number of structures, including the following:

=== The Uji Bridge ===
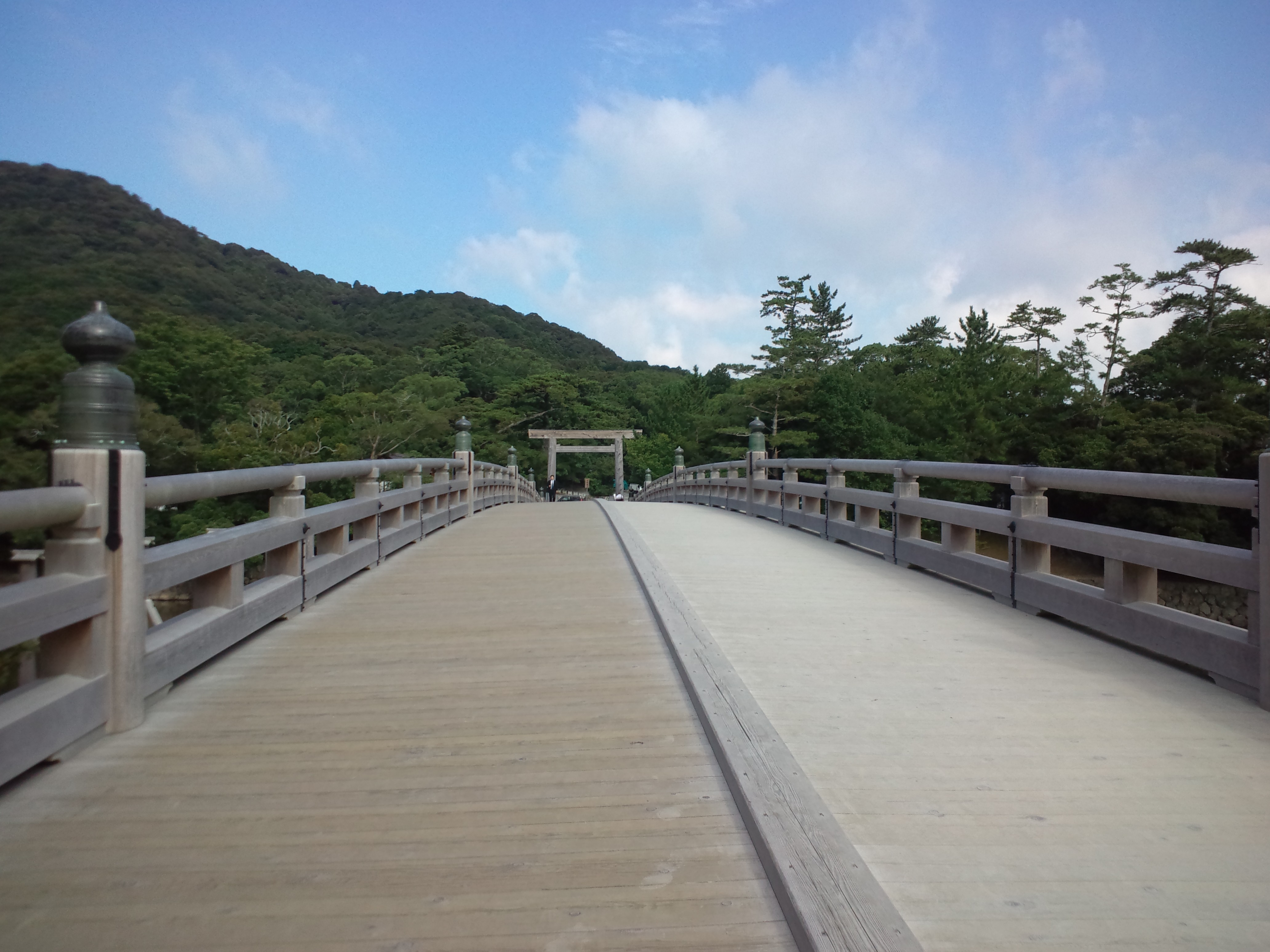
The Uji Bridge, 2012

This 100 meter wooden bridge, built in a traditional Japanese style, stretches across the Isuzu River at the entrance of Naikū. Like the shrine buildings of Naikū, it is rebuilt every 20 years as a part of the Shikinen Sengū ceremony. The bridge is typically built by carpenters with less experience to gain more skills before moving on to take on the task of working on the main shrine. On crossing the bridge, the path turns to the right along the banks of the Isuzu river and passes through large landscaped gardens.

=== Temizusha ===
After crossing a short, wide bridge, pilgrims to the shrine encounter the Temizusha, a small, roofed structure containing a pool of water for use in ritual purification. Visitors are encouraged to wash their hands and rinse their mouths at Temizusha as a symbolic act to clean the mind and body of impurity. The first of two large torii gates stands just beyond the Temizusha.

=== Saikan and Anzaisho ===
After passing the first large torii gate, the Purification Hall (Saikan), and the hall for visitors from the imperial household (Anzaisho) is located to the left. The Saikan is used by shrine priests to purify themselves before performing ceremonies at the shrine. They are required to spend one or two nights to free their minds of worldly issues, partaking in baths and eating meals cooked with the sacred fire.

=== Kaguraden ===
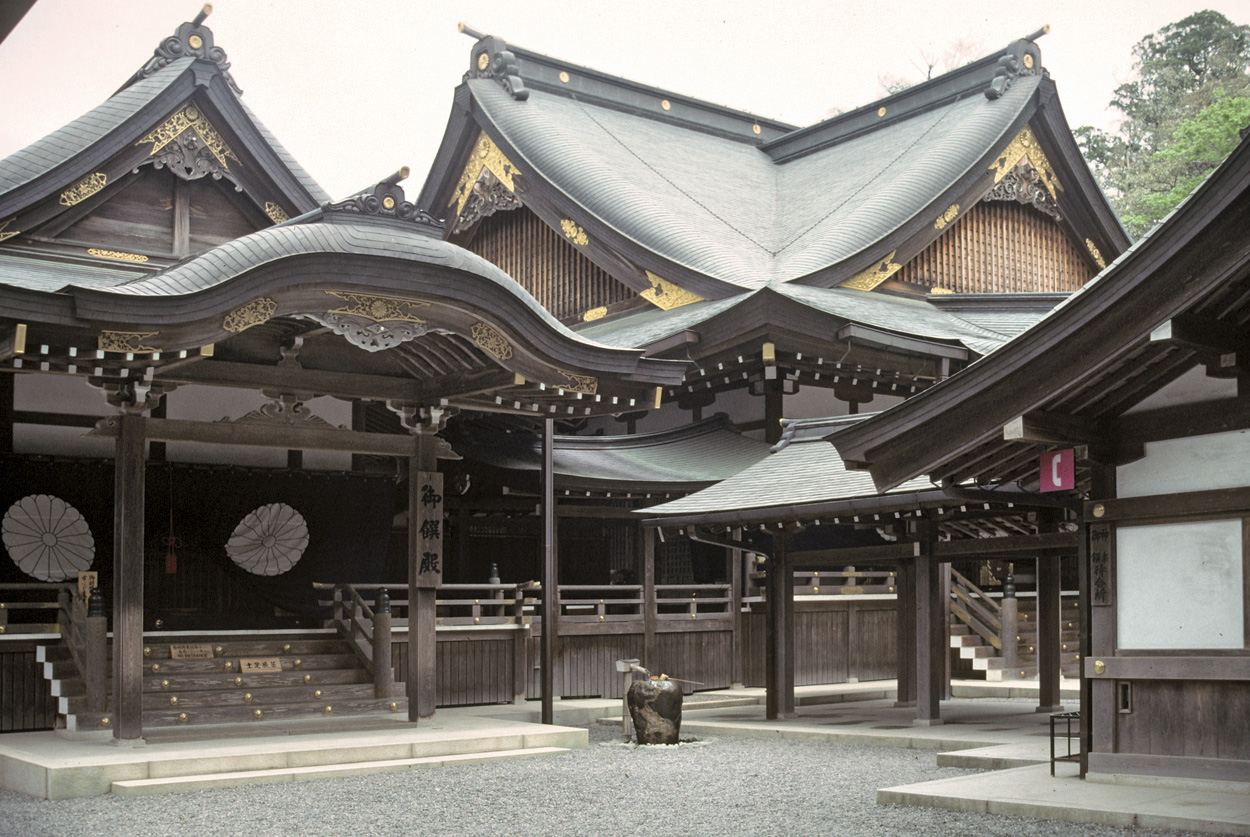
Kagura-den

This hall for special prayer, located just after the second large torii gate, is open to the public for the offering of individual prayers to the kami, the giving of donations and the purchase of special talisman of protection, amulets and hanging scrolls of Amaterasu Omikami.

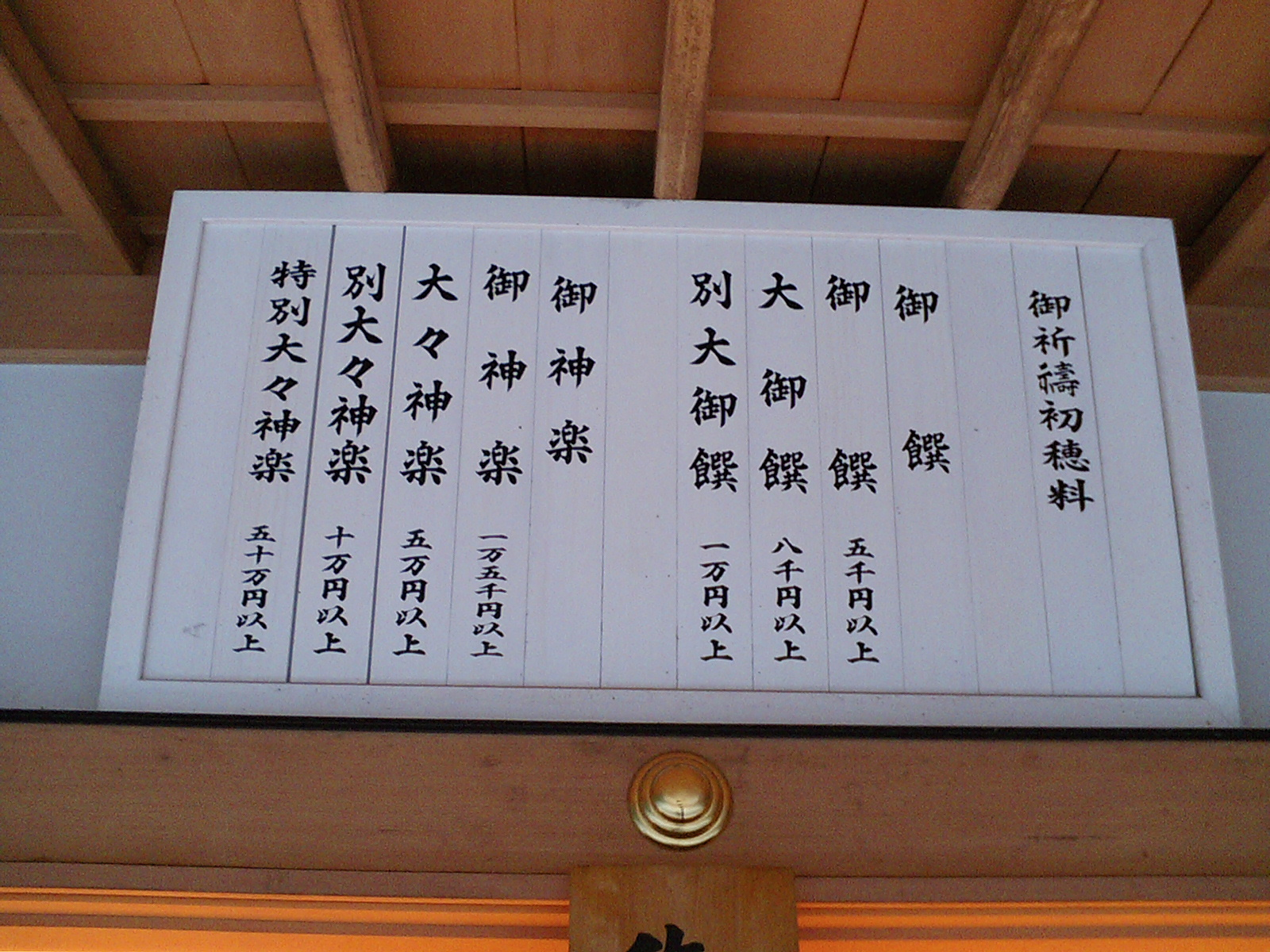
Prices for offering of shinsen and kagura, Toyouke Daijingū (Gekū), 2005

=== Imibiyaden ===
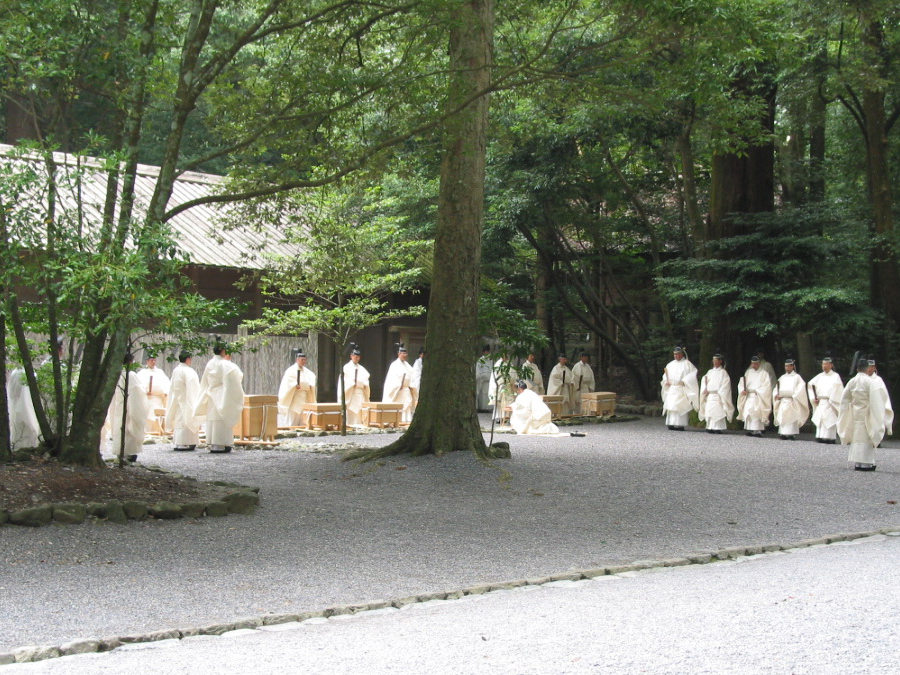
Imibiyaden, 2007

This hall contains the sacred fire used to cook all of the food offerings to the kami of Ise Shrine. Rice and other offerings cooked on the sacred fire are stored in a box made of Japanese cypress, then purified at the Haraedo immediately in front of the Imibiyaden before being offered to the kami.

=== Kōtai Jingū – the main shrine ===
The pilgrimage path then approaches the fence of the inner sanctum (昇殿, shōden) of Naikū by a set of large stone steps. Within another set of fencing inside the gate is the main shrine (正宮, seigū) itself. Visitors are supposed to keep to the sides of the path as the middle is set aside for the goddess Amaterasu. Etiquette is the same as for most Shinto shrines. Though the actual shrine is hidden behind a large fence, pilgrims can approach the gate to offer their prayers. Photographs in this area are prohibited and this restriction is strictly policed.

Kotai Jingū is said to hold the Sacred Mirror, one of three Imperial Regalia of Japan said to have been given to the first Emperor by the gods. From a path that follows the line of the outer wall, the distinctive roof of the shrine building can be seen through the trees. In front of the walled shrine compound can be seen an open area which was the location of the rebuilding of the shrine in 2013.

== Pilgrimage at Ise ==
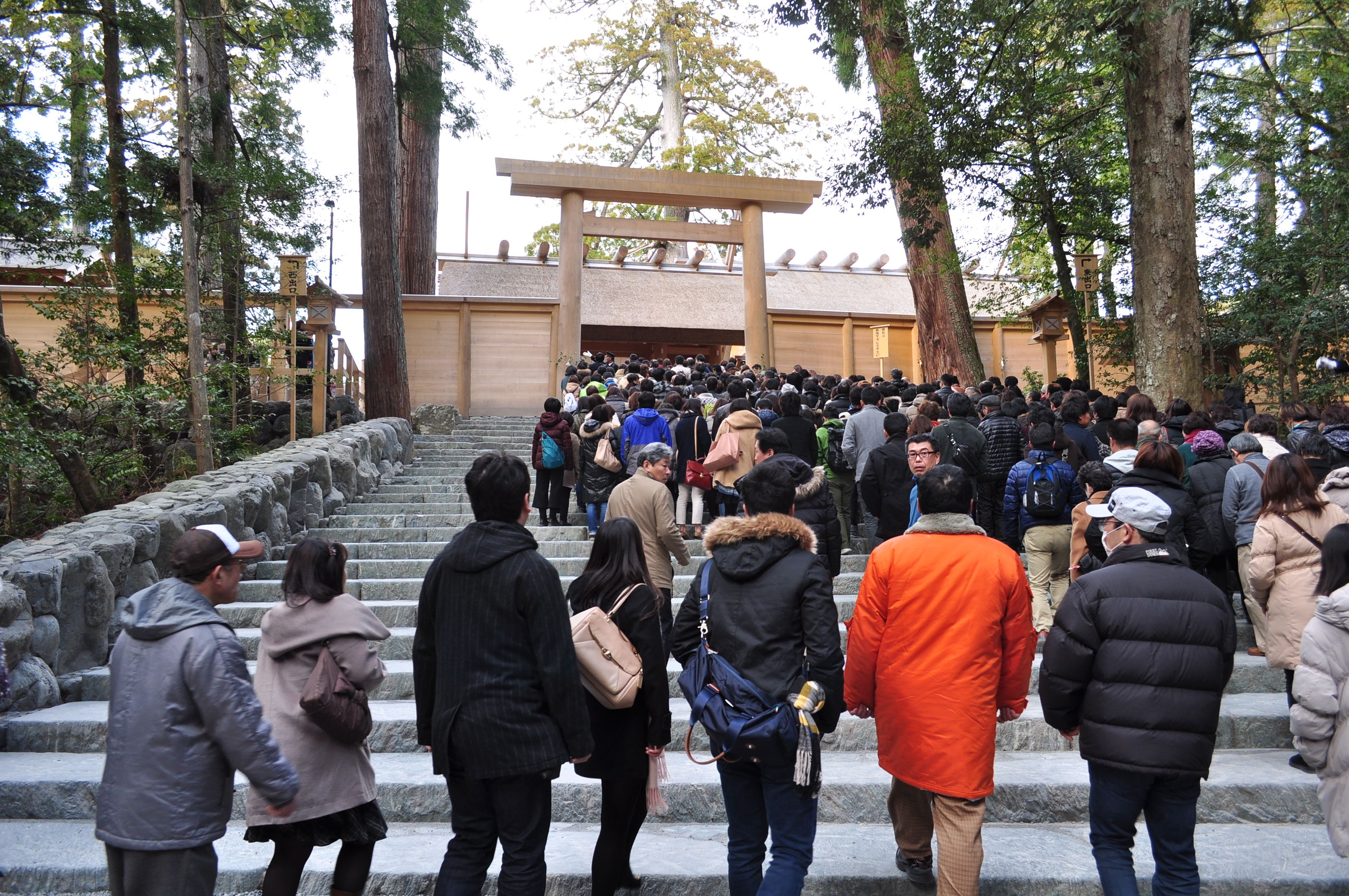
Visitors to the main shrine, Naikū, 2014

The pilgrimage to the Ise shrine, also known as Sangū, gained immense popularity during the Edo Period; hundreds of thousands of pilgrims would travel there every year. The growth was exceptional, 5 million pilgrims visiting the shrine in the year 1830 alone. By the late 19th century, tourists from abroad began to visit and document Ise. The popularity of making a trip to Ise resulted in vast networks and groups of travelers, which ultimately led to businesses working to benefit from this influx of interest for the shrine. Travel guidebooks were made to aid travelers in their navigation, as well to let them know of specific important places to visit while at Ise. They also included woodblock prints of the shrine that were very appealing to those who had made the long trek to the shrine. Additionally, people wanted souvenirs, which resulted in a variety of vendors at Ise selling general goods and specialty items. There were also various post stations which had specific gifts, many of which were woodblock prints. The pilgrimage had multiple purposes and appeals. It was seen as a purification process, and by visiting Ise, pilgrims were purified and aided in receiving a good afterlife. It also was seen as a vacation, the journey to the shrine itself being almost as important as actually getting there. In the 21st century, Ise is still an important destination both to foreign tourists and especially to the Japanese community; 9 million Japanese tourists visited the shrine in 2013.

== Shrines and facilities ==
=== Shrines ===
There are 125 shrines within Ise Shrine:

Shōgū
Name	Kanji	Enshrined	Kanji	Location
Kōtai Jingū (Naikū)	皇大神宮	Amaterasu Ōmikami; Ameno Tajikarao no kami Yorozuhata-Toyoakitsuhime no mikoto	天照大御神 天手力男神 万幡豊秋津姫命	Ujitachi, Ise city
Toyouke Daijingū (Gekū)	豊受大神宮	Toyouke no Ōmikami; 3 Mitomo no kami	豊受大御神 御伴神3座	Toyokawa, Ise city

Betsugū of Kōtai Jingū
	Name	Kanji	Enshrined	Kanji	Location
1	Aramatsuri no miya	荒祭宮	Amaterasu Ōmikami no Aramitama	天照大御神荒御魂	in Naikū
2	Tsukiyomi no miya	月讀宮	Tsukiyomi no mikoto	月讀尊	Nakamura, Ise city
3	Tsukiyomi no Aramitama no miya	月讀荒御魂宮	Tsukiyomi no mikoto no Aramitama	月讀尊荒御魂	in Tsukiyomi no miya
4	Izanagi no miya	伊佐奈岐宮	Izanagi no mikoto	伊佐奈岐尊	in Tsukiyomi no miya
5	Izanami no miya	伊佐奈弥宮	Izanami no mikoto	伊佐奈弥尊	in Tsukiyomi no miya
6	Takihara no miya	瀧原宮	Amaterasu Ōmikami no Mitama	天照大御神御魂	Takihara, Taiki town, Watarai district
7	Takihara no narabi no miya	瀧原竝宮	Amaterasu Ōmikami no Mitama	天照大御神御魂	in Takihara no miya
8	Izawa no miya	伊雑宮	Amaterasu Ōmikami no Mitama	天照大御神御魂	Isobe-chō-Kaminogō, Shima city
9	Yamatohime no miya	倭姫宮	Yamatohime no mikoto	倭姫命	Kusube, Ise city
10	Kazahinomi no miya	風日祈宮	Shinatsuhiko no mikoto Shinatobe no mikoto	級長津彦命 級長戸辺命	in Naikū

Betsugū of Toyouke Daijingū
	Name	Kanji	Enshrined	Kanji	Location
1	Taka no miya	多賀宮	Toyouke no Ōmikami no Aramitama	豊受大御神荒御魂	in Gekū
2	Tsuchi no miya	土宮	Ōtsuchi no mioya no kami	大土御祖神	in Gekū
3	Tsukiyomi no miya	月夜見宮	Tsukiyomi no mikoto Tsukiyomi no mikoto no Aramitama	月夜見尊 月夜見尊荒御魂	Miyajiri, Ise city
4	Kaze no miya	風宮	Shinatsuhiko no mikoto Shinatobe no mikoto	級長津彦命 級長戸辺命	in Gekū

Sessha of Kōtai Jingū
	Name	Kanji	Enshrined	Kanji	Location
1	Asakuma jinja	朝熊神社	Ōtoshi no kami Kokemushi no kami Asakuma no mizu no kami	大歳神 苔虫神 朝熊水神	Asama, Ise city
2	Asakuma mimae jinja	朝熊御前神社	Asakuma no mimae no kami	朝熊御前神	in Asakuma jinja
3	Sonai (Sonō) jinja	園相神社	Sonahihiko no mikoto Mimae no kami	曾奈比比古命 御前神	Tsumura, Ise city
4	Kamo jinja	鴨神社	Ishikorowake no mikoto Mimae no kami	石己呂和居命 御前神	Yamagammi, Tamaki, Watarai district
5	Tanoe jinja	田乃家神社	Ōkami no Misamukawa no kami	大神御滄川神	Yano, Tamaki, Watarai district
6	Tanoe mimae jinja	田乃家御前神社	Mimae no kami	御前神	same as Tanoe jinja
7	Kano jinja	蚊野神社	Ōkami no mikage no- kawa no kami	大神御蔭川神	Kano, Tamaki, Watarai district
8	Kano mimae jinja	蚊野御前神社	Mimae no kami	御前神	same as Kano jinja
9	Yuta jinja	湯田神社	Ōtoshi no mioya no mikoto Mimae no kami	大歳御祖命 御前神	Obata-chō-Yuta, Ise city
10	Ōtsuchi mioya jinja	大土御祖神社	Ōkunitama no mikoto Mizusasarahiko no mikoto Mizusasarahime no mikoto	大国玉命 水佐佐良比古命 水佐佐良比賣命	Kusube, Ise city
11	Kunitsu mioya jinja	国津御祖神社	Ujihime no mikoto Tamurahime no mikoto	宇治比賣命 田村比賣命	in Ōtoshi mioya jinja
12	Kuchira jinja	朽羅神社	Chiyorihime no mikoto Chiyorihiko no mikoto	千依比賣命 千依比古命	Hara, Tamaki, Watarai district
13	Ujiyōda jinja	宇治山田神社	Yamatahime no mikoto	山田姫命	Nakamura, Ise city
14	Tsunaga jinja	津長神社	Sunagahime no mikoto	栖長比賣命	Uji-Imazaike, Ise city (in front of Kōtai Jingū)
15	Katada jinja	堅田神社	Samitsuhime no mikoto	佐見都比女命	Futami-chō-Chaya, Ise city
16	Ōmizu jinja	大水神社	Ōyamazumi no mioya no mikoto	大山祇御祖命	Uji-imazaike, Ise city (in front of Kōtai Jingū)
17	E jinja	江神社	Nagakuchime no mikoto Ōtoshi no mioya no mikoto Ukano mitama no mikoto	長口女命 大歳御祖命 宇加乃御玉命	Futami-chō-E, Ise city
18	Kōzaki jinja	神前神社	Arasakihime no mikoto	荒崎比賣命	Futami-chō-Matsushita, Ise city
19	Awamiko jinja	粟皇子神社	Susanō no mikoto no Mitama no- michinushi no mikoto	須佐乃乎命御玉道主命	Futami-chō-Matsushita, Ise city
20	Kawara jinja	川原神社	Tsukiyomi no mikoto no Mitama	月讀尊御魂	Sōchi, Ise city
21	Kugutsuhime jinja	久具都比賣神社	kugutsuhime no mikoto kugutsuhiko no mikoto MImae no kami	久具都比賣命 久具都比古命 御前神	Kamikugu, Watarai town, Watarai district
22	Narahara jinja	奈良波良神社	Naraharahime no mikoto	那良原比女命	Miyako, Tamaki town, Watarai district
23	Sugihara jinja	棒原神社	Ama no subarume no mikoto- no Mitama; Mimae no kami	天須婆留女命御魂 御前神	Kami-Tanui, Tamaki town, Watarai district
24	Mifune jinja	御船神社	Ōkami no mikage no- kawa no mikoto	大神御蔭川神	Toba, Taki town, Taki district
25	Sakatekunari jinja	坂手国生神社	Takaminakami no mikoto (Takaminakami no kami)	高水上命 (高水上神)	Kami-Tanui, Tamaki town, Watarai district
26	Satakunari jinja	狭田國生神社	Hayakawahiko no mikoto Hayakawahime no mikoto Yamazue no Mitama	速川比古命 速川比女命 山末御魂	Sata, Tamaki town, Watarai district
27	Takihara jinja	多岐原神社	Manako no Kami	真奈胡の神	Misegawa, Taiki town, Watarai district

Sessha of Toyouke Daijingū
	Name	Kanji	Enshrined	Kanji	Location
1	Kusanagi jinja	草奈伎神社	Mishirushi no tsurugi no kami	御剣仗神 (標劔仗神)	Tokiwa, Ise city
2	Ōmakunari jinja	大間国生神社	Ōwakako no mikoto Otowakako no mikoto	大若子命 乙若子命	Tokiwa, Ise city
3	Watarai kuimii jinja	度会国御神社	Hikokunimigakitakeyotsuka no mikoto	彦国見賀岐建與束命	in Gekū
4	Watarai ōkunitamahime jinja	度会大国玉比賣神社	Ōkunitama no mikoto Mizusasarahime no mikoto	大国玉姫命 弥豆佐佐良比賣命	in Gekū
5	Tanoe ōmizu jinja	田上大水神社	Ogoto kan-nushi	小事神主	Fujisato, Ise city
6	Tanoe ōmizu mimae jinja	田上大水御前神社	Miyako	宮子	in Tanoe ōmizu jinja
7	Shitomi jinja	志等美神社	Kukunochi no kami	久久能智神	Tsujikuru, Ise city
8	Ōkōchi jinja	大河内神社	Ōyamazumi no kami	大山祇神	in Shitomi jinja
9	Kiyonoiba jinja	清野井庭神社	Kayanohime no mikoto	草野姫命	Tokiwa, Ise city
10	Takagawara jinja	高河原神社	Tsukiyomi no mikoto no Mitama	月夜見尊御魂	in Tsukiyomi no miya (Gekū, 月夜見宮)
11	Kawara jinja	河原神社	Kawa no kami	川神	Misono-chō-Shingai, Ise city
12	Kawarabuchi jinja	河原淵神社	Sawahime no mikoto	澤姫命	Funae, Ise city
13	Yamazue jinja	山末神社	Ōyamatsuhime no mikoto	大山津姫命	in Gekū
14	Usunono jinja	宇須乃野神社	Usunome no mikoto	宇須乃女命	Misono-chō-Takabuku, Ise city
15	Mike jinja	御食神社	Minato no miketsu kami	水戸御饗都	Kamiyashiro, Ise city
16	Obata jinja	小俣神社	Uka no Mitama no kami	宇賀御魂神	Obata-chō-motomachi, Ise city

Massha of Kōtai Jingū
	Name	Kanji	Enshrined	Kanji	Location
1	Kamoshimo jinja	鴨下神社	Ishikorowake no mikoto Kamohiko no mikoto Kamohime no mikoto	石己呂和居命 鴨比古命 鴨比賣命	Katsuta, Tamaki, Watarai district
2	Tsubura jinja	津布良神社	Tsuburahiko no mikoto Tsuburahime no mikoto	津布良比古命 津布良比賣命	Tsubura, Tamaki, Watarai district
3	Ashihara jinja	葦原神社	Sasatsuhiko no mikoto Ukano Mitama no mioya no mikoto Ikarihime no mikoto	佐佐津比古命 宇加乃御魂御祖命 伊加利比売命	in Tsukiyomi no miya (Naikū, 月讀宮)
4	Ogoso jinja	小社神社	Takaminakami mikoto)	高水上命	Ogoso-Sone, Tamaki, Watarai district
5	Komori jinja	許母利神社	Awashima no kami no mitama	粟嶋神御魂	same as Kōzaki jinja
6	Niikawa jinja	新川神社	Niikawahime no mikoto	新川比賣命	same as Tsunaga jinja
7	Iwai jinja	石井神社	Takaminakami no mikoto	高水上命	same as Tsunaga jinja
8	Uji no nuki jinja	宇治乃奴鬼	Takaminakami no mikoto	高水上命	Ōtoshi mioya jinja
9	Kanumi jinja	加努弥神社	Inayorihime no mikoto	稲依比女命	Kanome (Kanomi), Ise city without building
10	Kawaai jinja	川相神社	Hosokawa no mizu no kami	細川水神	same as Ōmizu jinja
11	Kumabuchi jinja	熊淵神社	Takiōtoji no kami	多支大刀自神	same as Ōmizu jinja
12	Arasaki jinja	荒前神社	Arasakihime no mikoto	荒前比賣命	same as Kōzaki jinja
13	Najime jinja	那自売神社	Ōminakami no mioya no mikoto Mimonosusohime no mikoto	大水上御祖命 御裳乃須蘇比賣命	same as Ujiyōda jinja
14	Ashidate jinja	葦立弖神社	Tamayarahime no mikoto	玉移良比女命	same as Kunitsu mioya jinja
15	Mumino jinja	牟弥乃神社	Samukawahiko no mikoto Samukawahime no mikoto	寒川比古命 寒川比女命	same as Mifune jinja
16	Kagaminomiya jinja	鏡宮神社	Iwanoue no futatsu no mikagami no mitama	岩上二面神鏡霊	Asama, Ise city

Massha of Toyouke Daijingū
	Name	Kanji	Enshrined	Kanji	Location
1	Igari jinja	伊我理神社	Igarihime no mikoto	伊我理比女命	in Gekū
2	Agata jinja	縣神社	Agata no kami	縣神	same as Usuno no jinja
3	Inaka jinja	井中神社	Inaka no kami	井中神	same as Ikari jinja
4	Uchikake jinja	打縣神社	Uchikake myōjin	打縣名神	in Shitomi jinja
5	Akasaki jinja	赤崎神社	Arasakihime no mikoto	荒崎姫命	Toba, Toba city
6	Mori jinja	毛理神社	Ki no kami	木神	same as Kawara jinja (河原神社)
7	Ōtsu jinja	大津神社	Ashihara kami (Ashihara no kami)	葦原神	in Gekū
8	Shioya jinja	志宝屋神社	Shiotsuchi no oji	塩土老翁	Ōminato, Ise city

Shokansha of Kōtai Jingū
	Name	Kanji	Enshrined	Kanji	Location
1	Takimatsuri no kami	滝祭神	Takimatsuri no Ōkami	瀧祭大神	in Naikū without building
2	Okitama no Kami	興玉神	Okitama no Kami	興玉神	in Naikū Shogū without building
3	Miyabi no kami	宮比神	Miyabi no kami	宮比神	in Naikū Shogū without building
4	Yanohahiki no kami	屋乃波比伎神	Yanohahiki no kami	屋乃波比伎神	in Naikū Shogū without building
5	Misakadono	御酒殿	Misakadono no kami	御酒殿神	in Naikū
6	Mishine no mikura	御稲御倉	Mishine no mikura no kami	御稲御倉神	in Naikū
7	Yuki no mikura	由貴御倉	Yuki no mikura no kami	由貴御倉神	in Naikū
8	Miya no meguri no kami	四至神	Miya no meguri no kami	四至神	in Naikū without building
9	Kan-Hatori hatadono jinja	神服織機殿神社	Kan-hatori hatadono no- mamori no kami	神服織機殿神社鎮守神	Ōgaito, Matsusaka city
10	Massha of Kan-Hatori hatadono jinja; 8 shrines	神服織機殿神社末社8所	Kan-hatori hatadono no- mamori no mimae no kami	神服織機殿神社鎮守御前神	in Kan-Hatori hatadono jinja
11	Kan-Omi hatadono jinja	神麻績機殿神社	Kan-Omi hatadono no- mamori no kami	神麻績機殿神社鎮守神	Iguchinaka, Matsusaka city
12	Massha of Kan-Omi hatadono jinja; 8 shrines	神麻績機殿神社末社8所	Kan-Omi hatadono no mamori no- mimae no kami	神麻績機殿神社鎮守御前神	in Kan-Omi hatadono jinja
13	Mishiodono jinja	御塩殿神社	Mishiodono no mamori no kami	御塩殿神社鎮守神	Futami-chō-Shō, Ise city
14	Aedohashihime jinja	饗土橋姫神社	Ujibashi no mamori no kami	宇治橋鎮守神	Uji-Imazaike, Ise city (in front of Kōtai Jingū)
15	Ōyamatsumi jinja	大山祇神社	Ōyamazumi no kami	大山祇神	in Naikū
16	Koyasu jinja	子安神社	Konohanasakuyahime no mikoto	木華開耶姫命	in Naikū (side of Ōyamatsumi jinja)

Shokansha of Toyouke Daijingū
	Name	Kanji	Enshrined	Kanji	Location
1	Misakadono	御酒殿	Misakadono no kami	御酒殿神	in Gekū
2	Miya no meguri no kami	四至神	Miya no meguri no kami	四至神	in Gekū without building
3	Kami no mii no jinja	上御井神社	Kami no mii no mamori no kami	上御井鎮守神	in Gekū
4	Shimo no mii no jinja	下御井神社	Shimo no mii no mamori no kami	下御井鎮守神	in Gekū

Shokansha of Betsugū
	Name	Kanji	Enshrined	Kanji	Location
1	Wakamiya jinja	若宮神社	Wakamiya no kami	若宮神	in Takihara no miya
2	Nagayuke jinja	長由介神社	Nagayuke no kami	長由介神	in Takihara no miya
3	Kawashima jinja	川島神社	Kawashima no kami	川島神	same as Nagayuke jinja
4	Saminaga jinja	佐美長神社	Shimonomii no mamori no kami	大歳神	Isobe-chō-Erihara, Shima city
5	Saminaga mimae jinja; 4 shrines	佐美長御前神社	Saminaga mimae no kami	佐美長御前神	in Saminaga jinja

=== Facilities ===
Facilities of Ise Shrine (not shrine)
	Name	Kanji	Articles	Kanji	Location
1	Yahiroden of Kan-Hatori hatadono jinja	神服織機殿神社八尋殿	Nigitae (silk)	和妙	in Kan-Hatori hatadono jinja
2	Yahiroden of Kan-Omi hatadono jinja	神麻績機殿神社八尋殿	Aratae (hemp)	荒妙	in Kan-Omi hatadono jinja
3	Jingu shinden (30,000 m^{2})	神宮神田	Goryō-mai (rice)	御料米	Kusube-chō, Ise city
4	Izawa no miya no omita (1,646 m^{2})	伊雑宮の御神田	Goryō-mai (rice)	御料米	Isobe-chō-Erihara, Shima city (side of Izawa no miya)
5	Mishiohama (6,609 m^{2})	御塩浜	Brine	御塩	Futami-chō-Nishi, Ise city
6	Mishiodono; Mishio kumiiresho Mishio yakisho (27,785 m^{2})	御塩殿 御塩汲入所 御塩焼所	Mishio (salt)	御塩	in Mishiodono jinja
7	Jingū misono (19,751 m^{2})	神宮御園	Vegetables and Fruits	野菜・果物	Futami-chō-Mizoguchi, Ise city
8	Awabi chōseisho (5,946 m^{2})	鰒調製所	Noshi Awabi (dried abalone)	熨斗鰒	Kuzaki-chō, Toba city
9	Hidai chōseisho (11,242 m^{2})	干鯛調製所	Hidai (dried sea bream)	干鯛	Shinojima, Minamichita town, Chita District, Aichi Prefecture
10	Doki chōseisho (2,878 m^{2})	土器調製所	Earthenwares	土器	Minomura, Meiwa town, Taki District

== See also ==
- Association of Shinto Shrines
- Atsuta Shrine, home of the sacred sword
- List of Shinto shrines
- Modern system of ranked Shinto shrines
- Saiō
- Sugari no Ontachi – One of the sacred treasures of Ise Grand Shrine
- Twenty-Two Shrines
