= Kagura-den =

Building within a Shinto shrine designated to Kagura performance

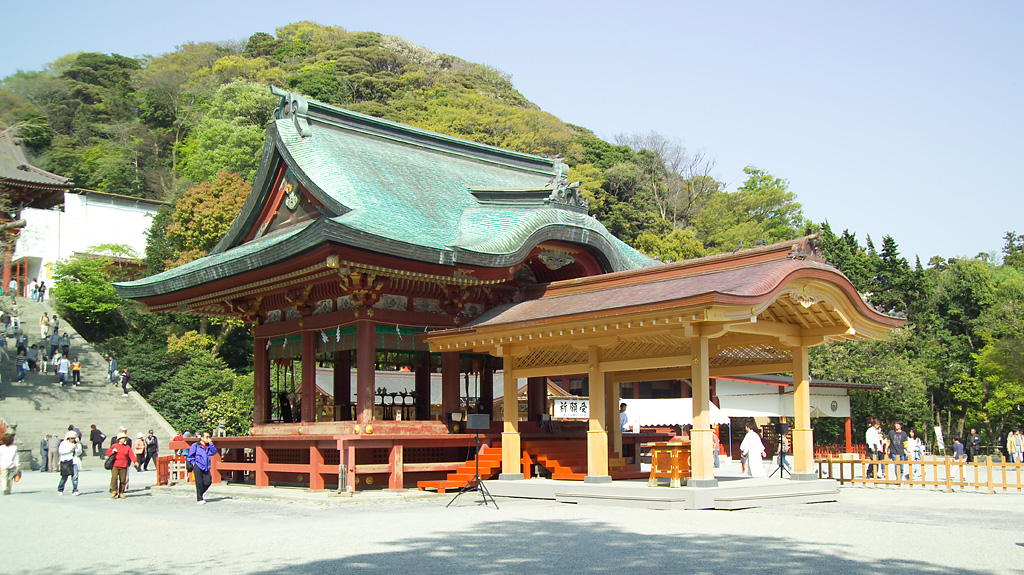
Tsurugaoka Hachiman-gū's kagura-den

The kagura-den (神楽殿; "kagura hall"), also called maidono (舞殿) or buden (舞殿) with reference to the bugaku traditional dance, is the building within a Shinto shrine where the sacred dance (kagura) and music are offered to the kami during ceremonies. It was originally just a temporary stage; first mentioned in a 9th-century text describing a maidono built in front of Hirano Shrine. In about a century, it had become a permanent shrine feature, and its use was extended until its function as a worship hall prevailed over the original. It is used also for weddings and Noh plays. Some scholars believe the haiden, or hall of worship, has its origins in the kagura-den.
