= Sengū =

Shinto practice of transferring kami to a new shrine

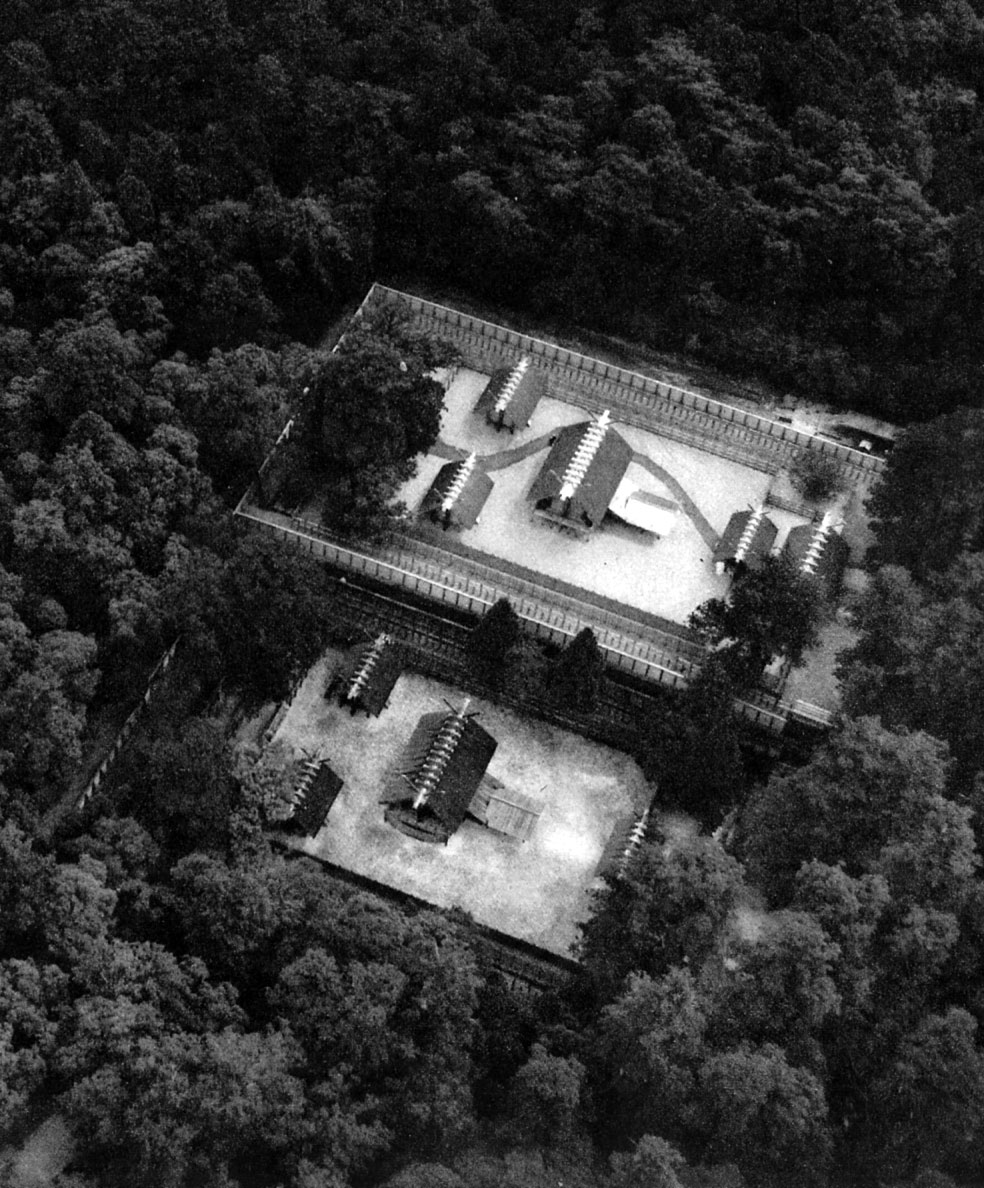
Ise Shrine Naiku, new at the top and old at the bottom

Sengū (遷宮) also called senza (遷座) is the practice in Shinto of transferring a kami's shintai to a new shrine when the old shrine is in need of repairs or rebuilding. The term sengū is generally used for this process when done at Ise Shrine, while senza is used for most other shrines. At Ise Shrine, the practice occurs once every twenty years when the shrines are rebuilt, a practice called Shikinen Sengū (式年遷宮; "sengū in prescribed years").

== Process at Ise Shrine ==
The Shikinen Sengū at Ise involves an extensive, multi-year preparation process. Timber-cutting ceremonies, from the Yamaguchisai to the Okihiki, mark the felling and transport of the sacred timber; carpentry rituals, from the Kozukuri hajime sai to the Mito sai, focus on the preparation of the building site and reconstruction of the shrine itself; and a further series of secret rites performed by shrine officials begins with purification and culminates in the Sengyo, the rite of transfer itself. Following eight years of preparation beginning with the Yamaguchi and Konomoto rites, the Sengyo is held in October of the prescribed year and constitutes the centerpiece of the Shikinen Sengū celebrations. As the kami is transferred under cover of darkness, an imperial messenger (chokushi) proclaims the shutsugyo three times, announcing the kami's journey to its new shrine, while the emperor faces the direction of Ise from within the Imperial Palace and performs a rite of distance worship (goyōhai no gi). The secret rites of transfer also include the extensive preparation of a ceremonial site for presenting food offerings (ōmike) to the enshrined kami in its new sanctuary; the entire Shikinen Sengū system can accordingly be considered a form of Ōkanname sai.

The practice underwent significant changes following the collapse of the ritsuryō system: its archaic form, in which shrine renewal was overseen by an imperial official (zōjingūshi) dispatched from the court, gave way in the medieval period to a system in which the court imposed a rice tax (yakubukumai) to fund reconstruction. Due to continuous warfare, the Sengū was temporarily suspended between 1462 and 1585. During the Tokugawa period, the Yamada magistrate directed the reconstruction work, financing it with 30,000 koku of rice, and the ceremony was properly restored.

== See also ==
- Ise Shrine
