= Nagoya Line =

Nagoya Line may refer to either of the following railway lines in Tōkai region, Japan:

- Kintetsu Nagoya Line, a railway line owned and operated by the Kintetsu Railway, connecting Matsusaka and Nagoya
- Meitetsu Nagoya Main Line, a railway line owned and operated by the Nagoya Railroad, connecting Toyohashi and Gifu via Nagoya
