= Kasumigaura =

Kasumigaura may refer to:

Places:

- Kasumigaura, Ibaraki, a city in Ibaraki prefecture, Japan
- Lake Kasumigaura, a lake in Honshu, Japan
- Kasumigaura Station, a railway station in the city of Kasumigaura
