= Masuno =

Masuno is a surname. Notable people with the surname include:

- Genta Masuno (born 1993), Japanese hurdler
- Hidetomo Masuno (born 1975), Japanese comedian, narrator, actor, playwright, and lyricist
- Shunmyō Masuno (born 1953), Japanese monk and garden designer

== See also ==
- Masuo
