= Mida Station =

Railway station in Suzuka, Mie Prefecture, Japan

Mida Station 箕田駅
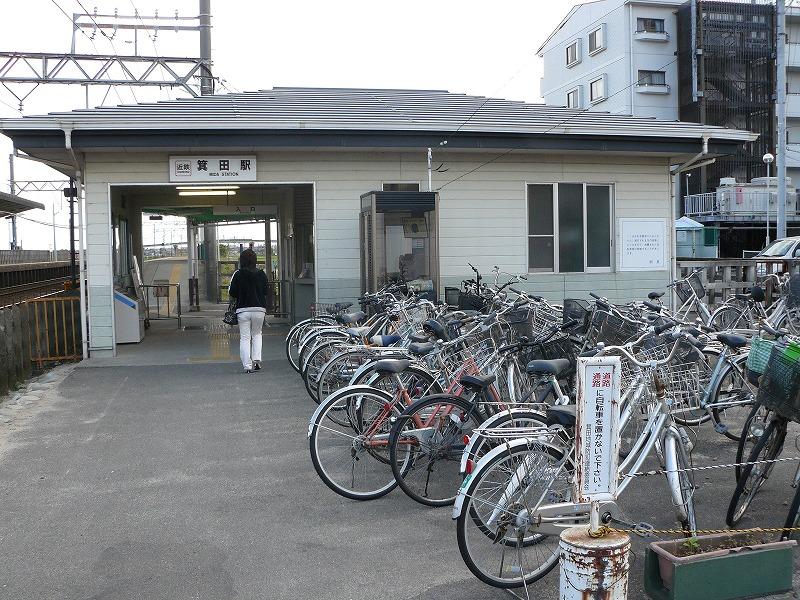
- Mida Station

General information
- Location: 1-18-10 Minami-Horie, Suzuka-shi, Mie-ken 513-0046; Japan
- Coordinates: 34°52′47.92″N 136°37′19.68″E
- Operator: Kintetsu Railway
- Line: Nagoya Line
- Distance: 47.0 km from Kintetsu Nagoya
- Platforms: 2 side platforms

Other information
- Station code: E28
- Website: Official website

History
- Opened: December 22, 1917

Passengers
- FY2019: 494 daily
Location
- Location within Mie Prefecture Location within Japan

Mida Station (箕田駅, Mida-eki) is a passenger railway station in located in the city of Suzuka, Mie Prefecture, Japan, operated by the private railway operator Kintetsu Railway.

== Lines ==
Mida Station is served by the Nagoya Line, and is located 47.0 rail kilometers from the starting point of the line at Kintetsu Nagoya Station.

== Station layout ==
The station was consists of Mida two opposed side platforms connected by a level crossing. The station is unattended.

=== Platforms ===
1	■ Nagoya Line	for Tsu, Osaka and Kashikojima
2	■ Nagoya Line	for Yokkaichi and Nagoya

== Adjacent stations ==
«	Service	»
Kintetsu Nagoya Line
Nagonoura	Local	Ise-Wakamatsu
Express: Does not stop at this station

== History ==
Mida Station opened on December 22, 1917 as a station on the Ise Railway. The Ise Railway became the Sangu Express Electric Railway’s Ise Line on September 15, 1936, and was renamed the Nagoya Line on December 7, 1938. After merging with Osaka Electric Kido on March 15, 1941, the line became the Kansai Express Railway's Nagoya Line. This line was merged with the Nankai Electric Railway on June 1, 1944 to form Kintetsu. The station was rebuilt in July 1943, approximately 600 meters closer towards Ise-Nakagawa.

== Passenger statistics ==
In fiscal 2019, the station was used by an average of 494 passengers daily (boarding passengers only).

== Surrounding area ==
- Suzuka City Oki Junior High School
- Suzuka City Minoda Elementary School

== See also ==
- List of railway stations in Japan
