= Tsuzumigaura Station =

Railway station in Suzuka, Mie Prefecture, Japan

Tsuzumigaura Station 鼓ヶ浦駅
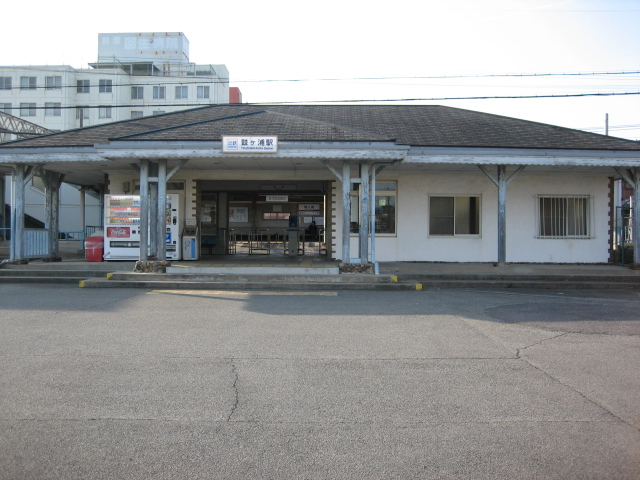
- Tsuzumigaura Station

General information
- Location: 4-16-16 Jike, Suzuka-shi, Mie-ken 510-0254; Japan
- Coordinates: 34°49′33.65″N 136°34′52.36″E
- Operator: Kintetsu Railway
- Line: Nagoya Line
- Distance: 54.1 km from Kintetsu Nagoya
- Platforms: 2 side platforms

Other information
- Station code: E32
- Website: Official website

History
- Opened: September 10, 1915
- Former names: Koyasu Kannon (until 1922)

Passengers
- FY2019: 644 daily
Location
- Location within Mie Prefecture Location within Japan

Tsuzumigaura Station (鼓ヶ浦駅, Tsuzumigaura-eki) is a passenger railway station in located in the city of Suzuka, Mie Prefecture, Japan, operated by the private railway operator Kintetsu Railway.

== Lines ==
Tsuzumigaura Station is served by the Nagoya Line, and is located 54.1 rail kilometers from the starting point of the line at Kintetsu Nagoya Station.

== Station layout ==
The station was consists of two opposed side platforms, connected by a footbridge. The station is unattended.

=== Platforms ===
1	■ Nagoya Line	for Tsu, Toba, Osaka Namba, Kashikojima
2	■ Nagoya Line	for Kintetsu Yokkaichi, Kuwana, Nagoya

== Adjacent stations ==
«	Service	»
Nagoya Line
Express (急行): Does not stop at this station
Shiroko	Local (普通)	Isoyama

== History ==
Tsuzumigaura Station opened on September 10, 1915 as Koyasu Kannon Station (子安観音駅, Koyasu Kannon eki) on the Ise Railway. It was renamed to its present name on October 1, 1922. The Ise Railway became the Sangu Express Electric Railway’s Ise Line on September 15, 1936, and was renamed the Nagoya Line on December 7, 1938. After merging with Osaka Electric Kido on March 15, 1941, the line became the Kansai Express Railway's Nagoya Line. This line was merged with the Nankai Electric Railway on June 1, 1944 to form Kintetsu.

== Passenger statistics ==
In fiscal 2019, the station was used by an average of 644 passengers daily (boarding passengers only).

== Surrounding area ==
- Koyasu Kannon Temple
- Tsuzumigaura beach
- Suzuka City Kogaura Junior High School

== See also ==
- List of railway stations in Japan
