= Akuragawa Station =

Railway station in Yokkaichi, Mie Prefecture, Japan

Akuragawa Station 阿倉川駅
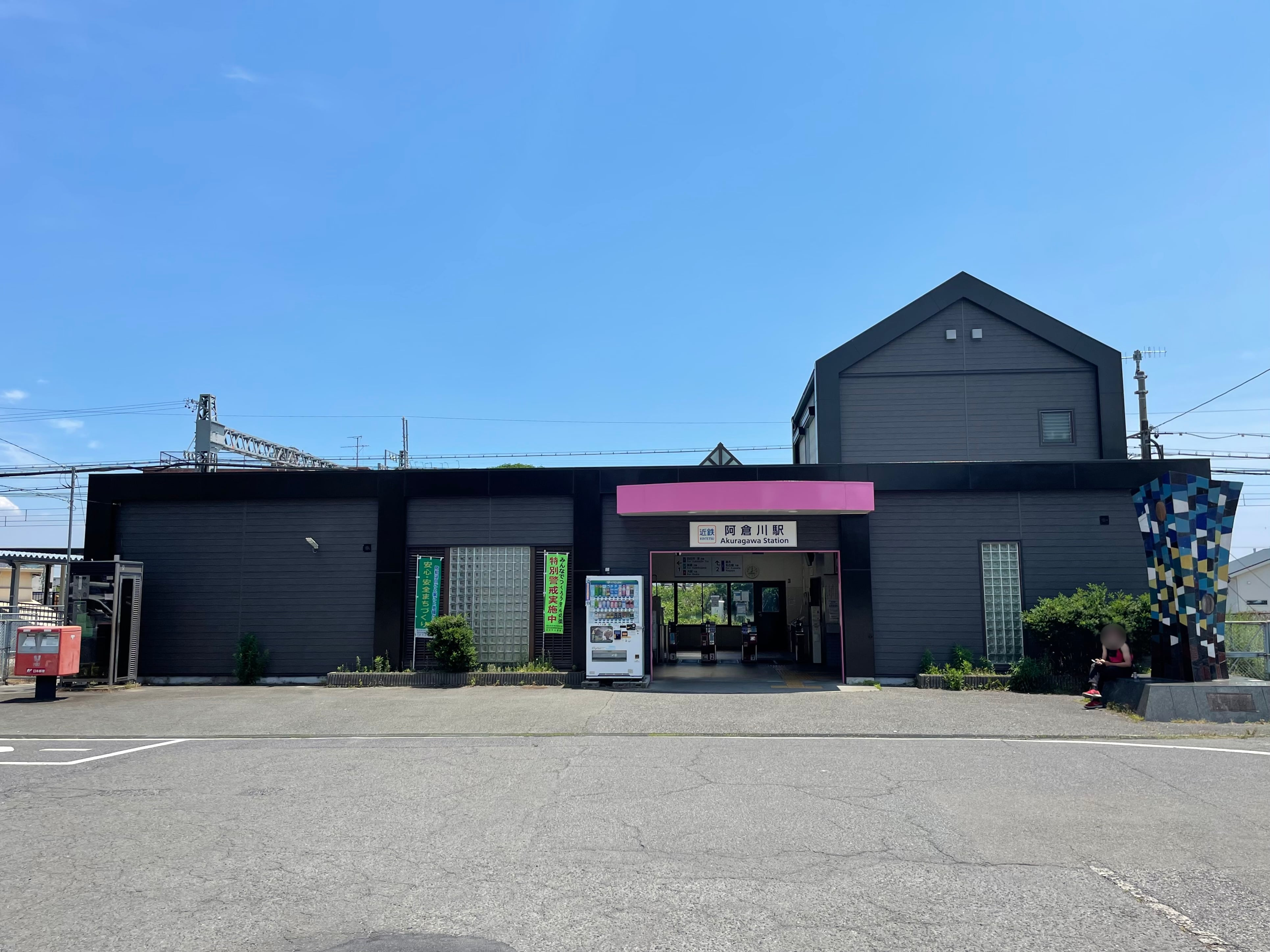
- Akuragawa Station

General information
- Location: 8-9 Akuragawa-chō, Yokkaichi-shi, Mie-ken 510-0803; Japan
- Coordinates: 34°59′4.9″N 136°37′43.44″E
- Operator: Kintetsu Railway
- Line: Nagoya Line
- Distance: 34.6 km from Kintetsu Nagoya
- Platforms: 2 side platforms

Other information
- Station code: E19
- Website: Official website

History
- Opened: January 30, 1929

Passengers
- FY2019: 2464 daily
Location
- Location within Mie Prefecture Location within Japan

Akuragawa Station (阿倉川駅, Akuragawa-eki) is a passenger railway station in located in the city of Yokkaichi, Mie Prefecture, Japan, operated by the private railway operator Kintetsu Railway.

== Lines ==
Akuragawa Station is served by the Nagoya Line, and is located 34.6 rail kilometers from the starting point of the line at Kintetsu Nagoya Station.

== Station layout ==
The station consists of two opposed side platforms, connected by an underground passage.

This station had two island platforms serving four lines until March 16, 2018. It was abolished with the change of time of the next day, and the bus number was changed.

=== Platforms ===
1	■ Nagoya Line	for Tsu, Osaka and Kashikojima
2	■ Nagoya Line	for Kuwana and Nagoya

== Adjacent stations ==
«	Service	»
Kintetsu Nagoya Line
Kasumigaura	Local	Kawaramachi
Kasumigaura	Semi-Express	Kawaramachi
Express: Does not stop at this station

== History ==
Akuragawa Station opened on January 30, 1929, as a station on the Ise Railway. The Ise Railway became the Sangu Express Electric Railway’s Ise Line on September 15, 1936, and was renamed the Nagoya Line on December 7, 1938. After merging with Osaka Electric Kido on March 15, 1941, the line became the Kansai Express Railway's Nagoya Line. This line was merged with the Nankai Electric Railway on June 1, 1944, to form Kintetsu.

== Passenger statistics ==
In fiscal 2019, the station was used by an average of 2464 passengers daily (boarding passengers only).

== Surrounding area ==
- Yokkaichi City Hall Kaizo District Citizen Center
- Yokkaichi Kaizo Elementary School
- Yokkaichi City Yamate Junior High School

== See also ==
- List of railway stations in Japan
