= Masuo Station =

Masuo Station is the name of two train stations in Japan:

- Masuo Station (Mie) (益生駅)
- Masuo Station (Chiba) (増尾駅)
