= Takadahonzan Station =

Railway station in Tsu, Mie Prefecture, Japan

Takadahonzon Station 高田本山駅
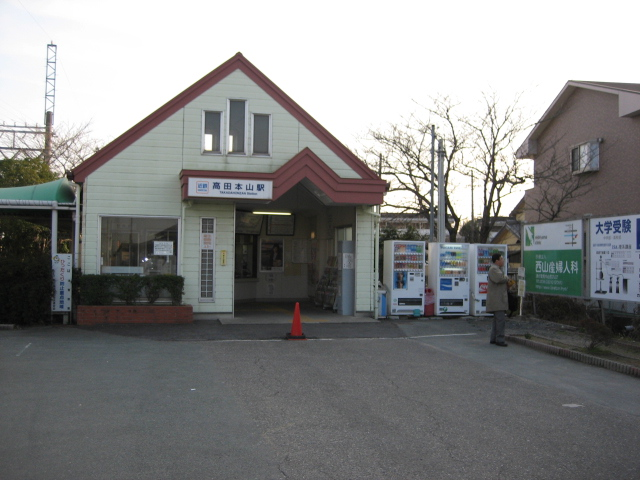
- Takadahonzon Station

General information
- Location: 369-2 Isshinden-cho Hirano, Tsu-shi, Mie-ken 514-0111; Japan
- Coordinates: 34°45′20″N 136°30′59.1″E
- Operator: Kintetsu Railway
- Line: Nagoya Line
- Distance: 64.1 km from Kintetsu Nagoya
- Platforms: 2 side platforms

Other information
- Station code: E37
- Website: Official website

History
- Opened: September 10, 1915
- Former names: Isshindencho (until 1918)

Passengers
- FY2019: 810 daily
Location
- Location within Mie Prefecture Location within Japan

Takadahonzan Station (高田本山駅, Takadahonzan-eki) is a passenger railway station in located in the city of Tsu, Mie Prefecture, Japan, operated by the private railway operator Kintetsu Railway.

== Lines ==
Takadahonzan Station is served by the Nagoya Line, and is located 64.1 rail kilometers from the starting point of the line at Kintetsu Nagoya Station.

== Station layout ==
The station was consists of two opposed side platforms, connected by a level crossing. The station is unattended.

=== Platforms ===
1	■ Nagoya Line	for Tsu, Toba,Osaka Namba, Kashikojima
2	■ Nagoya Line	for Kintetsu Yokkaichi, Kuwana, Nagoya

== Adjacent stations ==
«	Service	»
Nagoya Line
Express (急行): Does not stop at this station
Shiratsuka	Local (普通)	Edobashi

== History ==
Takadahonzan Station opened on September 10, 1915, as Isshindencho Station (一身田町駅, Ishhinden-cho Station) on the Ise Railway. It was renamed to its present name on November 1, 1918. The Ise Railway became the Ise Electric Railway on September 12, 1926, which merged with the Sangu Express Electric Railway on September 15, 1936. On March 15, 1941, the Sangu Express Electric Railway merged with Osaka Electric Railway to become a station on Kansai Express Railway's Nagoya Line. This line in turn was merged with the Nankai Electric Railway on June 1, 1944, to form Kintetsu.

== Passenger statistics ==
In fiscal 2019, the station was used by an average of 810 passengers daily (boarding passengers only).

== Surrounding area ==
- Ise Railway Ise Line Higashi-Ishinden Station
- Takadahonzan Senshuji Temple
- Takada Junior High School / High School / Takada Junior College

== See also ==
- List of railway stations in Japan
