= Shiroko Station =

Railway station in Suzuka, Mie Prefecture, Japan

Shiroko Station 白子駅
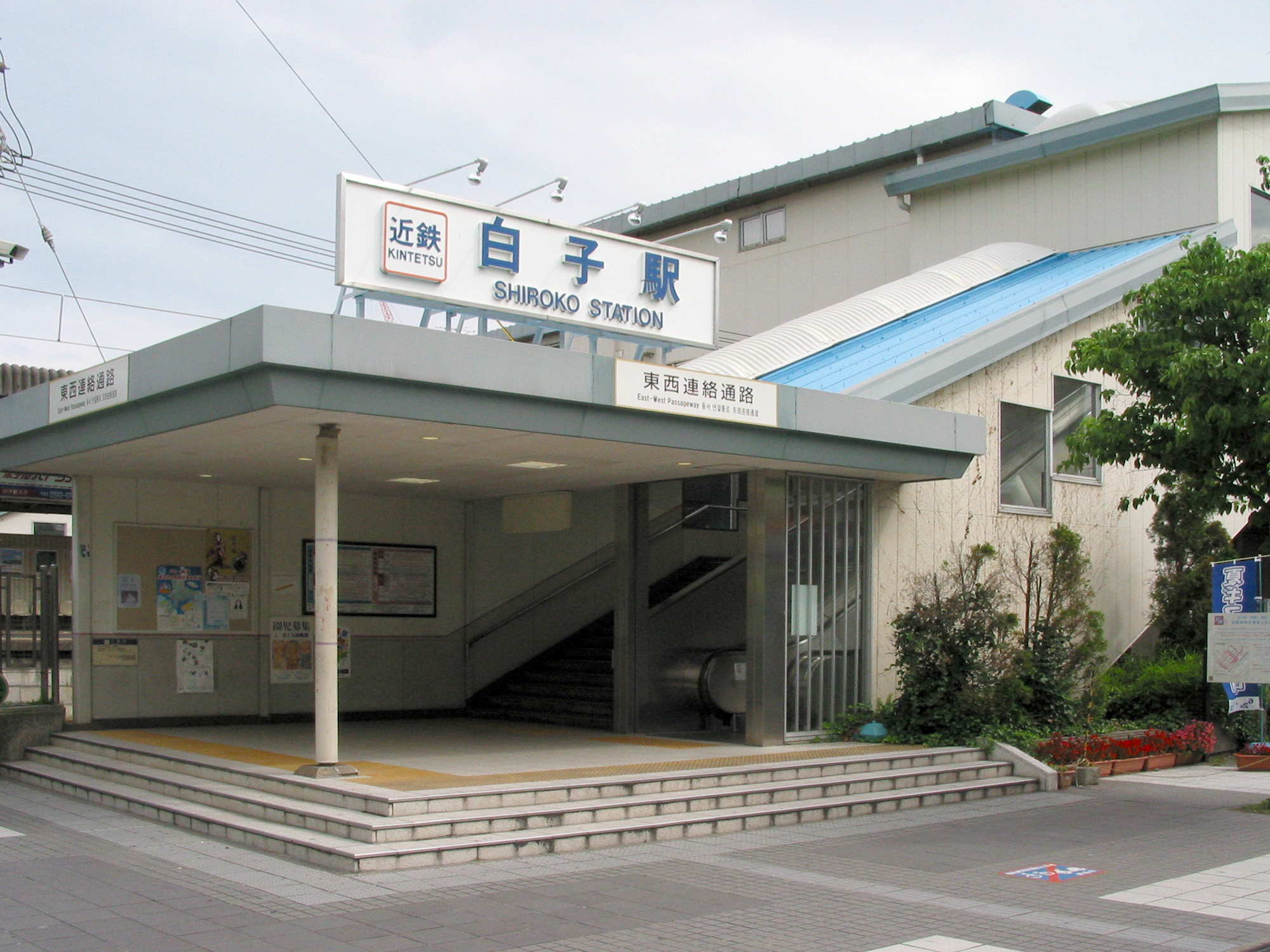
- Shiroko Station

General information
- Location: 22-1 Shiroko-eki mae, Suzuka-shi, Mie-ken 510-0241; Japan
- Coordinates: 34°50′2.49″N 136°35′22.5″E
- Operator: Kintetsu Railway
- Line: Nagoya Line
- Distance: 52.9 km from Kintetsu Nagoya
- Platforms: 2 island platforms

Other information
- Station code: E31
- Website: Official website

History
- Opened: September 10, 1915

Passengers
- FY2019: 8366 daily
Location
- Location within Mie Prefecture Location within Japan

Shiroko Station (白子駅, Shiroko-eki) is a passenger railway station in located in the city of Suzuka, Mie Prefecture, Japan, operated by the private railway operator Kintetsu Railway. All trains excluding part of limited express trains stop at this station. When the Formula 1 Japanese Grand Prix is held at Suzuka Circuit, extra trains terminate and originate at this station for the spectators.

== Lines ==
Shiroko Station is served by the Nagoya Line, and is located 52.9 rail kilometers from the starting point of the line at Kintetsu Nagoya Station.

== Station layout ==
The station was consists of two ground-level island platforms serving four tracks. Ticket gates are located in the building over the platforms and tracks.

=== Platforms ===
1, 2	■ Nagoya Line	for Tsu, Osaka and Toba
3, 4	■ Nagoya Line	for Yokkaichi, Kuwana and Nagoya

== Adjacent stations ==
«	Service	»
Kintetsu Nagoya Line
Chiyozaki	Local	Tsuzumigaura
Ise-Wakamatsu	Express	Edobashi
Kintetsu-Yokkaichi	Limited Express	Tsu

== History ==
Shiroko Station opened on September 10, 1915, as a station on the Ise Railway. It was renamed to its present name on October 1, 1922. The Ise Railway became the Sangu Express Electric Railway's Ise Line on September 15, 1936, and was renamed the Nagoya Line on December 7, 1938. After merging with Osaka Electric Kido on March 15, 1941, the line became the Kansai Express Railway's Nagoya Line. This line was merged with the Nankai Electric Railway on June 1, 1944, to form Kintetsu. A new station building was completed in March 1979.

== Passenger statistics ==
In fiscal 2019, the station was used by an average of 8366 passengers daily (boarding passengers only).

== Surrounding area ==
- Mie Prefectural Shiroko High School
- Suzuka Municipal Shiroko Elementary School
- Soyora Suzuka-shiroko

Bus stop (Shiroko Station West, 白子駅西)
- Mie Kotsu
  - Route 01 for Hiratacho Station via Naka-Asahigaoka Itchome
  - Route 02 for Suzuka Central Hospital via Suzukashi Station
  - Route 03 for Suzuka Circuit via Naka-Asahigaoka Itchome
  - Route 05 for Apita Suzuka and Suzuka Central Hospital
  - Route 05 for Sakurajima Yonchome and Suzuka Central Hospital
  - Expressway bus for Tachikawa Station North Entrance, Shinjuku Station West Entrance, Ikebukuro Station East Entrance, Omiya Station West Entrance and Seibu Bus Omiya Branch
  - Expressway bus for Y-CAT, Ikebukuro Station East Entrance, Omiya Station West Entrance and Seibu Bus Omiya Branch
  - Expressway bus for Kokura, Hakata Bus Terminal and Nishitetsu Tenjin Bus Station
- C-BUS (community bus)
  - Shiroko Hirata Route for Bell City via Tokuda Station and Koudai

== See also ==
- List of railway stations in Japan
