= Shinshō Station =

Railway station in Yokkaichi, Mie Prefecture, Japan

Shinshō Station 新正駅
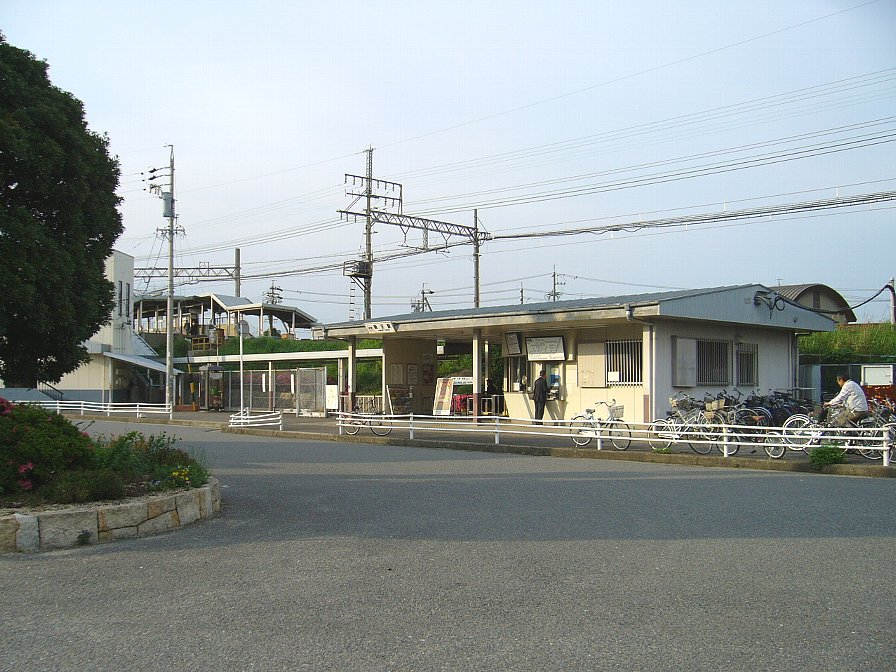
- Shinshō Station

General information
- Location: 4-5-20 Shinshō, Yokkaichi-shi, Mie-ken 510-0064; Japan
- Coordinates: 34°57′19.94″N 136°37′7.15″E
- Operator: Kintetsu Railway
- Line: Nagoya Line
- Distance: 38.1 km from Kintetsu Nagoya
- Platforms: 2 side platforms

Other information
- Station code: E22
- Website: Official website

History
- Opened: July 20, 1975

Passengers
- FY2019: 783 daily
Location
- Location within Mie Prefecture Location within Japan

Shinshō Station (新正駅, Shinshō-eki) is a passenger railway station located in the city of Yokkaichi, Mie Prefecture, Japan, operated by the private railway operator Kintetsu Railway.

== Lines ==
Shinshō Station is served by the Nagoya Line, and is located 38.1 rail kilometers from the starting point of the line at Kintetsu Nagoya Station.

== Station layout ==
The station consists of two opposed side platforms.

=== Platforms ===
1	■ Nagoya Line	for Tsu, Ise-Nakagawa
2	■ Nagoya Line	for Yokkaichi, Kuwana, Nagoya

== Adjacent stations ==
«	Service	»
Kintetsu Nagoya Line
Kintetsu Yokkaichi	Local	Miyamado
Express: Does not stop at this station

== History ==
Shinshō Station opened on July 20, 1975.

== Passenger statistics ==
In fiscal 2019, the station was used by an average of 783 passengers daily (boarding passengers only).

== Surrounding area ==
- Central Ryokuchi Park-A
- Yokkaichi Joint Government Building, Mie Prefecture

== See also ==
- List of railway stations in Japan
