= Shiohama Station =

Railway station in Yokkaichi, Mie Prefecture, Japan

Shiohama Station 塩浜駅
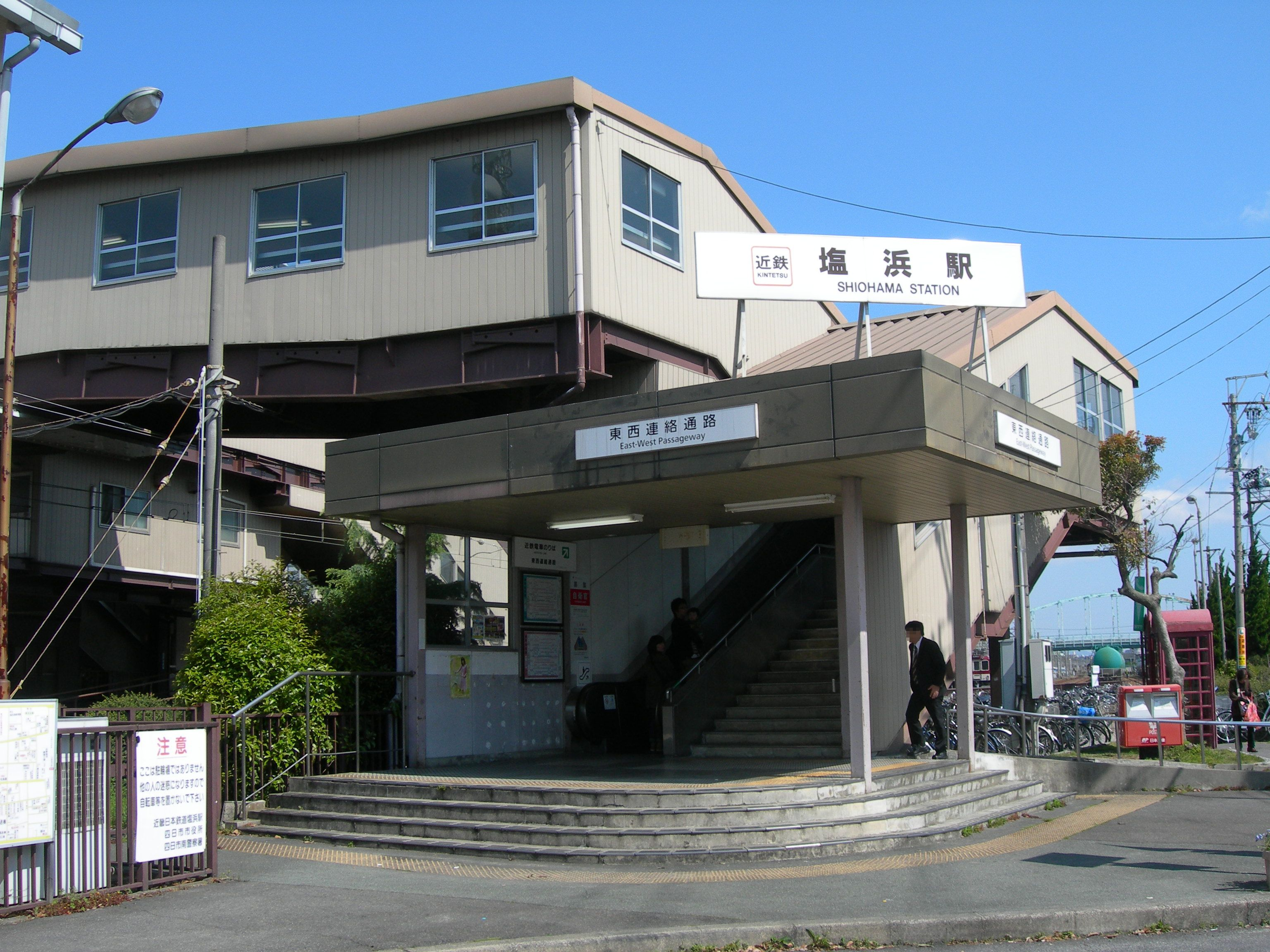
- Shiohama Station in April 2010

General information
- Location: 2-82 Misono-chō, Yokkaichi-shi, Mie-ken 510-0862; Japan
- Coordinates: 34°55′56.58″N 136°37′19.83″E
- Operator: Kintetsu Railway; JR Freight
- Lines: Nagoya Line; Kansai Main Line freight branch
- Distance: 40.8 km from Kintetsu Nagoya
- Platforms: 2 island platforms

Other information
- Station code: E24
- Website: Official website

History
- Opened: October 25, 1919

Passengers
- FY2019: 3468 daily

Services
Preceding station	Kintetsu Railway	Following station
Kita-Kusu towards Ise-Nakagawa	Nagoya Line Local	Miyamado towards Kintetsu-Nagoya
Ise-Wakamatsu towards Ise-Nakagawa	Nagoya Line Express	Kintetsu Yokkaichi towards Kintetsu-Nagoya
Location
- Location within Mie Prefecture Location within Japan

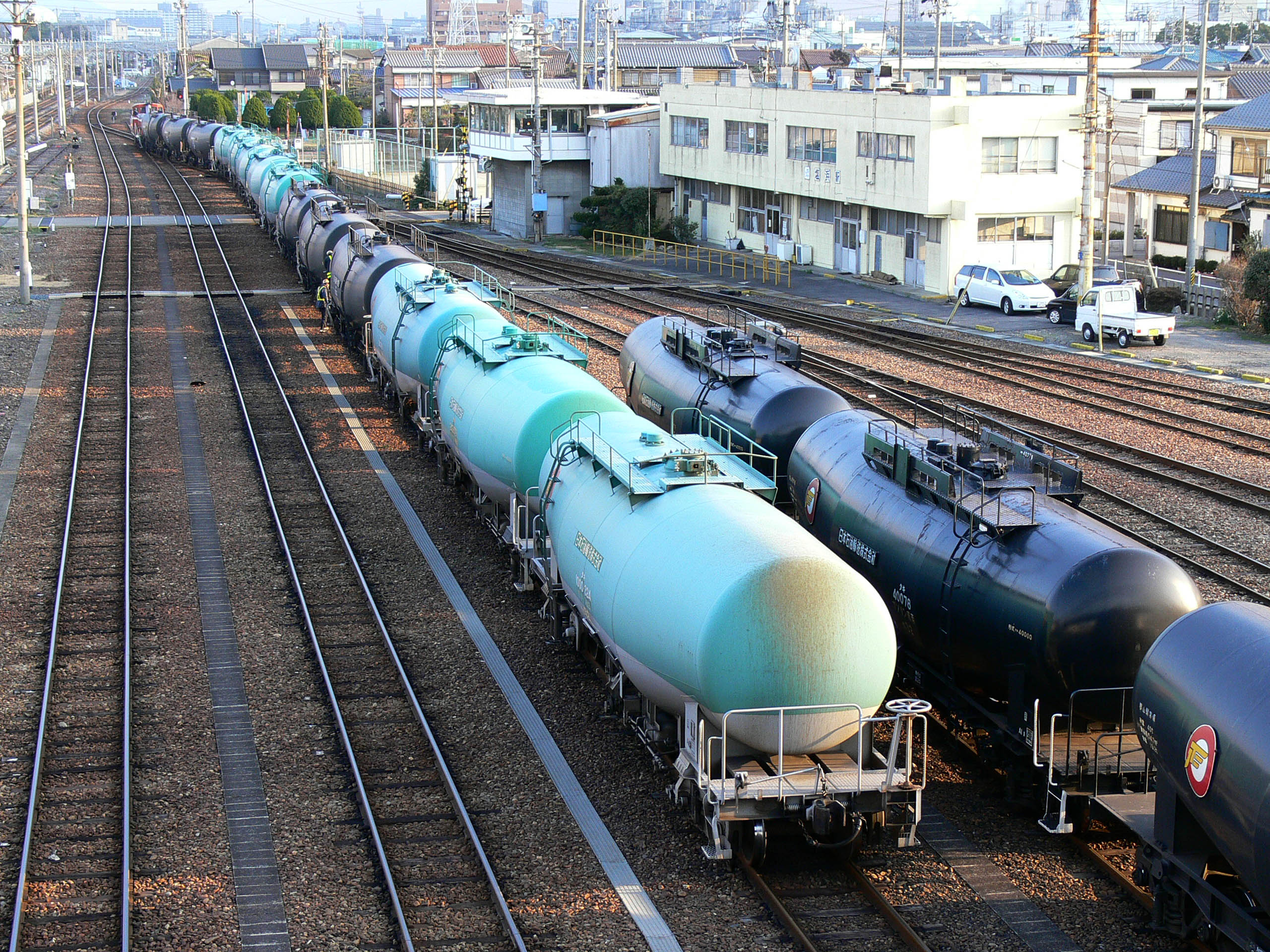
Freight cars at Shiohama Station

Shiohama Station (塩浜駅, Shiohama-eki) is a railway station in located in the city of Yokkaichi, Mie Prefecture, Japan, operated by the private railway operator Kintetsu Railway. It also has a freight depot operated by the Japan Freight Railway Company (JR Freight).

== Lines ==
Shiohama Station is served by the Nagoya Line, and is located 40.8 rail kilometers from the starting point of the line at Kintetsu Nagoya Station. Freight operations use the Kansai Main Line freight branch.

== Station layout ==
The station consists of two island platforms serving four tracks, connected by an elevated concourse.

=== Platforms ===
1, 2	■ Nagoya Line	for Tsu, Osaka Namba, and Kashikojima
3, 4	■ Nagoya Line	for Yokkaichi, Kuwana, and Nagoya

== History ==
Shiohama Station opened on October 25, 1919, as a station on the Ise Railway. The Ise Railway became the Sangu Express Electric Railway's Ise Line on September 15, 1936, and was renamed the Nagoya Line on December 7, 1938. After merging with Osaka Electric Kido on March 15, 1941, the line became the Kansai Express Railway's Nagoya Line. This line was merged with the Nankai Electric Railway on June 1, 1944, to form Kintetsu. A new station building was completed on June 23, 1986.

The freight terminal was opened as part of the Japanese Government Railways freight operations on June 1, 1944, subsequently part of the Japanese National Railways (JNR). Containerized freight operations were handled from April 1, 1962, to July 1, 1975. With the privatization and dissolution of the JNR on April 1, 1987, operation of the freight terminal came under the Japan Freight Railway Company, which resumed container operations from June 20, 1988, to March 16, 1996.

== Passenger statistics ==
In fiscal 2019, the station was used by an average of 3468 passengers daily (boarding passengers only).

== Surrounding area ==
- Minami-Yokkaichi Station (JR Central Kansai Main Line)
- Japan National Route 23
- Yokkaichi City Shiohama Elementary School
- Yokkaichi City Shiohama Junior High Schoolt

== See also ==
- List of railway stations in Japan
