= Kawagoe, Mie =

Kawagoe 川越町
- Town
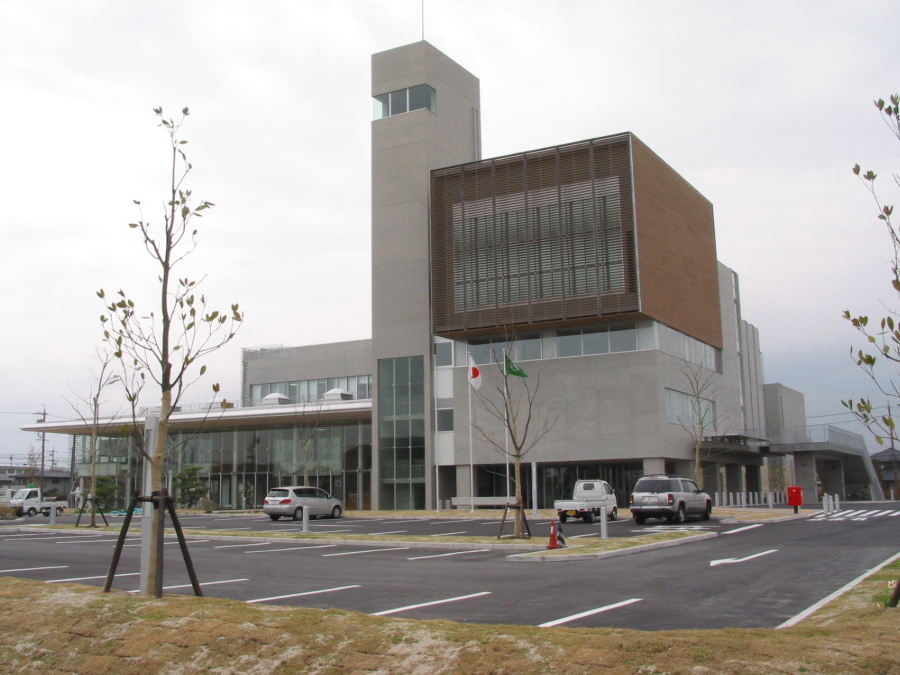
- Kawagoe Town Office

- Flag Seal

- Location of Kawagoe in Mie Prefecture

- Coordinates: 35°1′N 136°40′E
- Country: Japan
- Region: Kansai
- Prefecture: Mie
- District: Mie

Area
  - Total: 8.73 km^{2} (3.37 sq mi)

Population (September 1, 2021)
  - Total: 15,409
  - Density: 1,770/km^{2} (4,570/sq mi)
- Time zone: UTC+9 (Japan Standard Time)
- Tree: Round Leaf Holly
- Flower: Narcissus
- Bird: Barn Swallow
- Phone number: 059-366-7112
- Address: 280 Toyota-isshiki Minami-Udono, Kawagoe-chō, Mie-gun, Mie-ken 510-8588
- Website: Official website

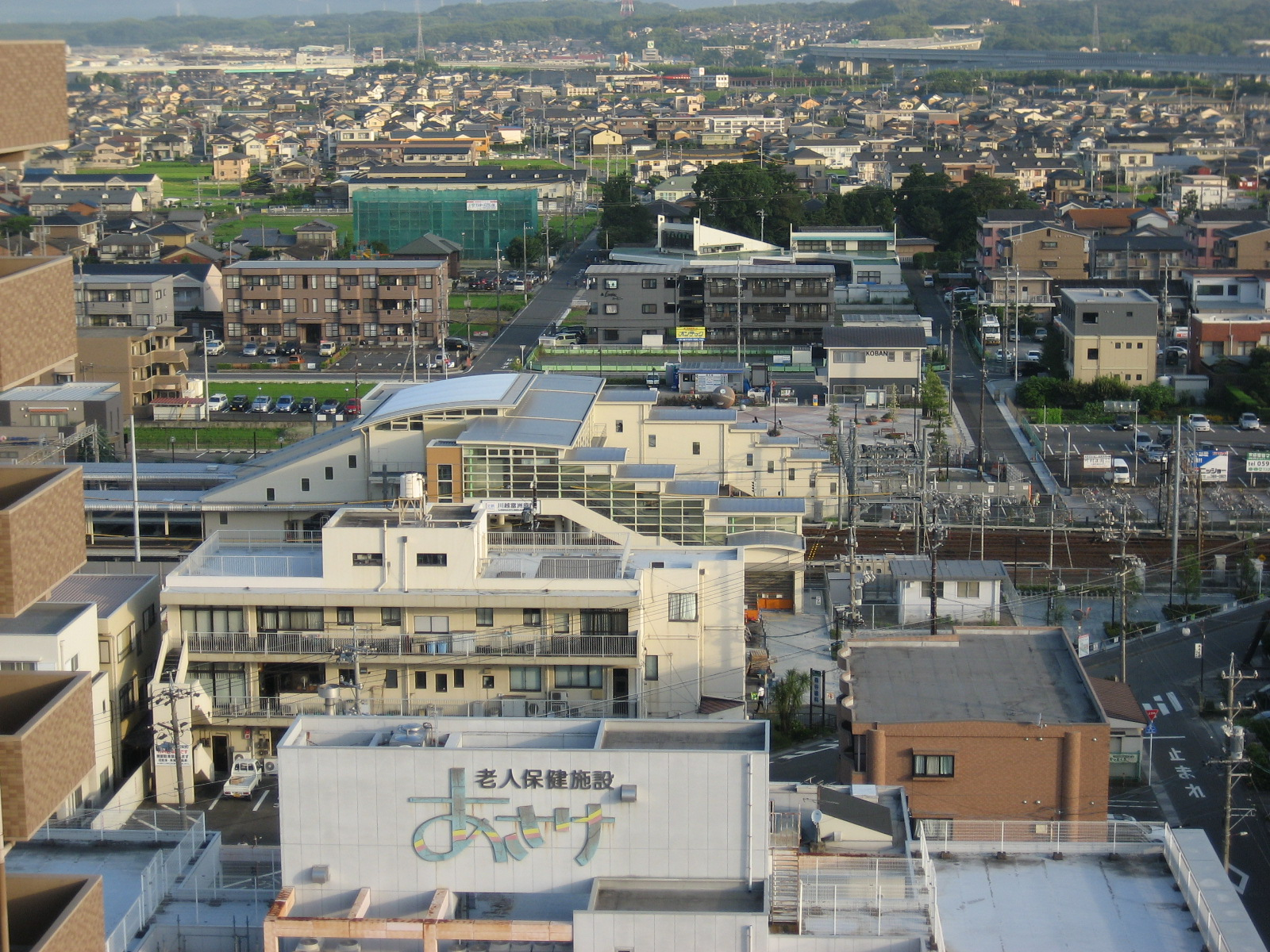
downtown Kawagoe

Kawagoe (川越町, Kawagoe-chō) is a town located in Mie Prefecture, Japan. As of 1 September 2021, the town had an estimated population of 15,409 in 7021 households and a population density of 1800 persons per km^{2}. The total area of the town was 8.73 square kilometres (3.37 sq mi).

== Geography ==
Kawagoe is located in northeastern Mie Prefecture, in the lowlands bordering on Ise Bay. Parts of the municipality are polders, at (or near) sealevel.

=== Neighboring municipalities ===
Mie Prefecture

- Asahi
- Kuwana
- Yokkaichi

== Climate ==
Kawagoe has a humid subtropical climate (Köppen Cfa) characterized by warm summers and cool winters with light to no snowfall. The average annual temperature in Kawagoe is 14.9 °C. The average annual rainfall is 1656 mm with September as the wettest month. The temperatures are highest on average in August, at around 26.6 °C, and lowest in January, at around 3.5 °C.

== Demographics ==
Per Japanese census data, the population of Kawagoe has increased steadily over the past 30 years.

Historical population
| Year | Pop. | ±% |
|---|---|---|
| 1960 | 8,388 | — |
| 1970 | 10,605 | +26.4% |
| 1980 | 10,645 | +0.4% |
| 1990 | 9,988 | −6.2% |
| 2000 | 11,782 | +18.0% |
| 2010 | 14,005 | +18.9% |

== History ==
The area of present-day Kawagoe was located in ancient Ise Province and was part of the holdings of Kuwana Domain in the Edo period, It was an area of large scale land reclamation projects by the Domain to increase its rice lands. During the Meiji period, Kawagoe was one of the villages established within Asake District of Mie Prefecture with the creation of the modern municipalities system on April 1, 1889. Asake District was abolished in 1896, and merged with Mie District. Kawagoe village was raised to town status on October 17, 1957.

== Government ==
Kawagoe has a mayor-council form of government with a directly elected mayor and a unicameral town council of 12 members. Kawagoe, collectively with the other municipalities of Mie District, contributes two members to the Mie Prefectural Assembly. In terms of national politics, the town is part of Mie 3rd district of the lower house of the Diet of Japan.

== Economy ==
Kawagoe has an economy based on agriculture and Commercial fishing. Chubu Electric's Kawagoe Power Station is located in the town.

== Education ==
Kawagoe has two public elementary schools and one public middle school operated by the town government, and one public high school operated by the Mie Prefectural Board of Education.

== Transportation ==
=== Railway ===
Kintetsu Railway – Nagoya Line

- Kawagoe Tomisuhara

=== Highway ===
- Isewangan Expressway
- National Route 1
- National Route 23

== Notable people ==
- Yūta Ishikawa – professional shogi player
- Kumiko Ogura – professional badminton player
