= Shiratsuka Station =

Railway station in Tsu, Mie Prefecture, Japan

Shiratsuka Station 白塚駅
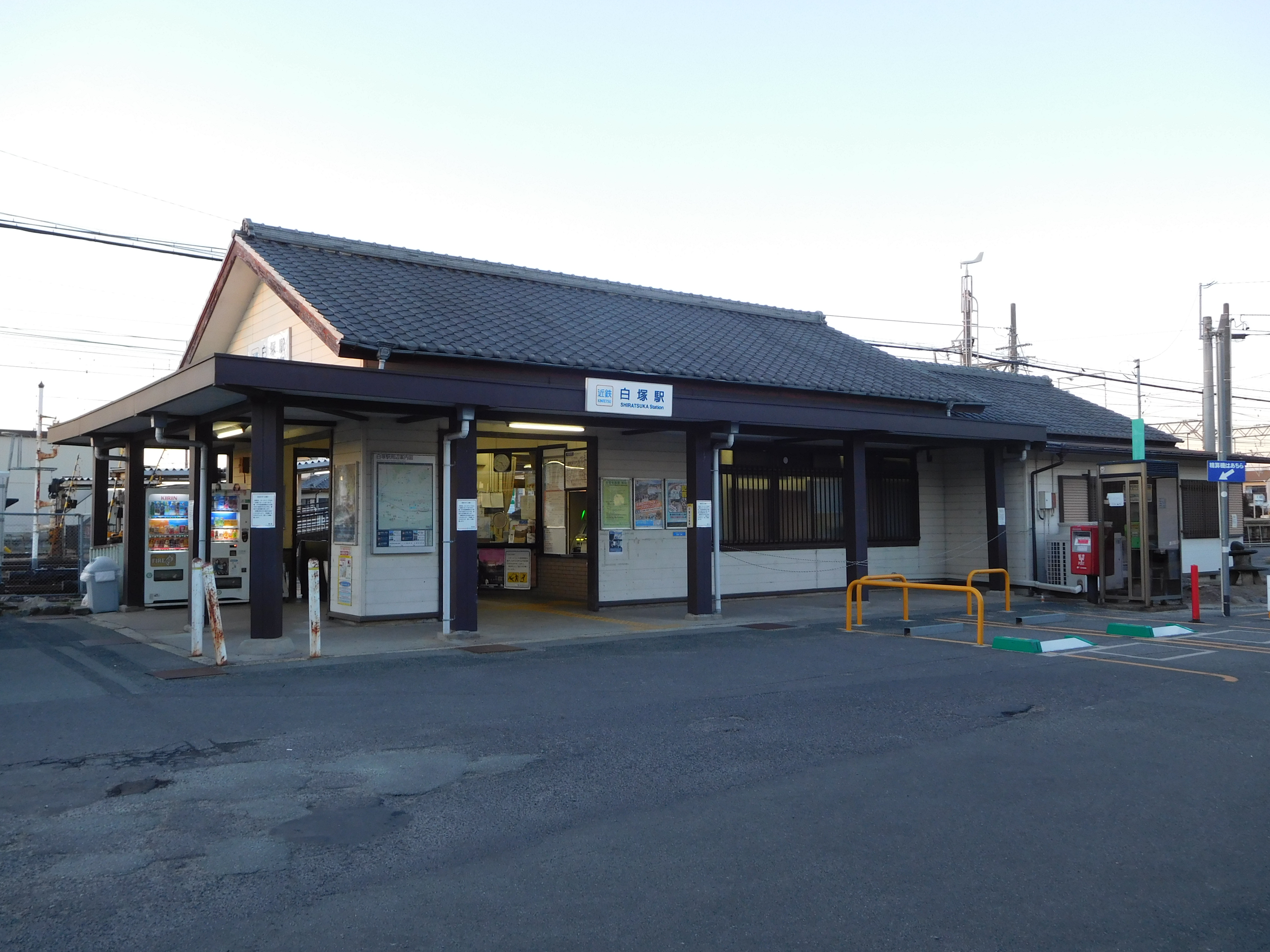
- Shiratsuka Station in January 2017

General information
- Location: 820-2 Shiratsuka, Tsu-shi, Mie-ken 514-0101; Japan
- Coordinates: 34°46′13.3″N 136°31′56.9″E
- Operator: Kintetsu Railway
- Line: Nagoya Line
- Distance: 61.7 km from Kintetsu Nagoya
- Platforms: 2 island platforms

Other information
- Station code: E36
- Website: Official website

History
- Opened: May 8, 1944

Passengers
- FY2019: 839 daily
Location
- Location within Mie Prefecture Location within Japan

Shiratsuka Station (白塚駅, Shiratsuka-eki) is a passenger railway station in located in the city of Tsu, Mie Prefecture, Japan, operated by the private railway operator Kintetsu Railway.

== Lines ==
Shiratsuka Station is served by the Nagoya Line, and is located 61.7 rail kilometers from the starting point of the line at Kintetsu Nagoya Station.

== Station layout ==
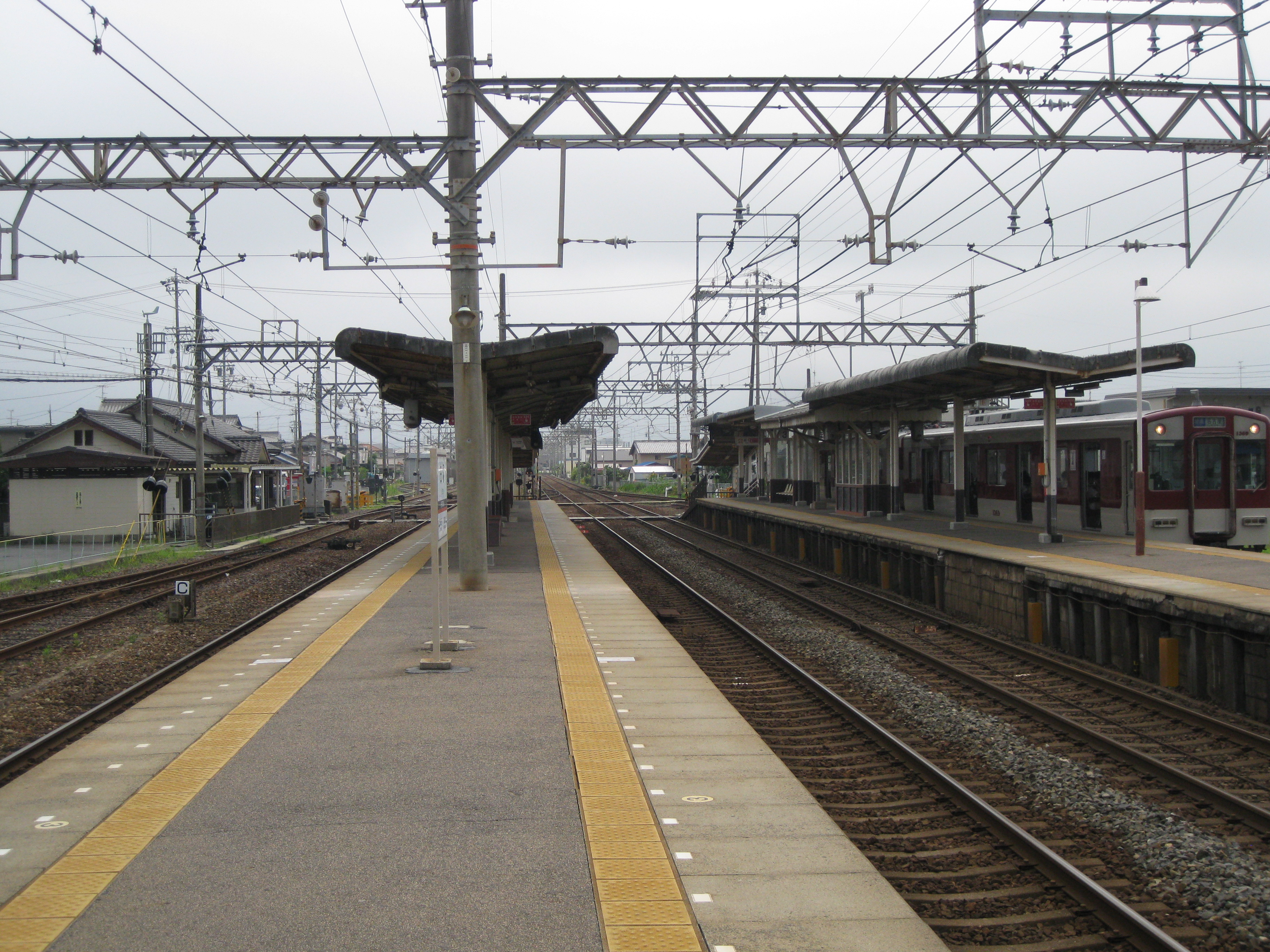
The platforms in July 2014

The station consists of two island platforms serving four tracks, connecting with a level crossing to and from the station building in the south-east of Ise-Nakagawa-bound platform. Shiratsuka Depot is located in the area of the station.

=== Platforms ===
1, 2	■ Nagoya Line	for Tsu, Toba and Kashikojima
3, 4	■ Nagoya Line	for Yokkaichi, Kuwana and Nagoya

== Adjacent stations ==
«	Service	»
Kintetsu Nagoya Line
Toyotsu-Ueno	Local	Takadahonzan
Express: Does not stop at this station

== History ==
Shiratsuka Station opened on May 8, 1944, as a station on Kansai Express Railway's Nagoya Line. This line was merged with the Nankai Electric Railway on June 1, 1944, to form Kintetsu.

== Passenger statistics ==
In fiscal 2019, the station was used by an average of 839 passengers daily (boarding passengers only).

== Surrounding area ==
- Shiratsuka Civic Center
- Asahi Denki Kogyo

== See also ==
- List of railway stations in Japan
