= Ise-Asahi Station =

Railway station in Asahi, Mie Prefecture, Japan

Ise-Asahi Station 伊勢朝日駅
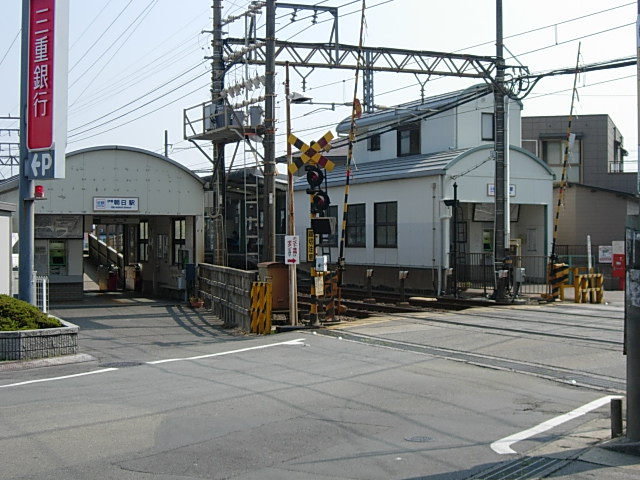
- Ise-Asahi Station

General information
- Location: 739-2 Komukai, Asahi-cho, Mie-gun, Mie-ken 510-8102; Japan
- Coordinates: 35°2′17.35″N 136°40′8.32″E
- Operator: Kintetsu Railway
- Line: Nagoya Line
- Distance: 27.4 km from Kintetsu Nagoya
- Platforms: 2 side platforms

Other information
- Station code: E15
- Website: Official website

History
- Opened: January 30, 1929

Passengers
- FY2019: 2196 daily
Location
- Location within Mie Prefecture Location within Japan

Ise-Asahi Station (伊勢朝日駅, Ise-Asahi-eki) is a passenger railway station in located in the town of Asahi, Mie District, Mie Prefecture, Japan, operated by the private railway operator Kintetsu Railway.

== Lines ==
Ise-Asahi Station is served by the Nagoya Line, and is located 27.4 rail kilometers from the starting point of the line at Kintetsu Nagoya Station.

== Station layout ==
The station consists of two opposed side platforms, and is the only station on the Nagoya Line without connection between the platforms.

=== Platforms ===
1	■ Nagoya Line	for Yokkaichi, Osaka and Kashikojima
2	■ Nagoya Line	for Kuwana and Nagoya

== Adjacent stations ==
«	Service	»
Kintetsu Nagoya Line
Masuo	Local (普通)	Kawagoe Tomisuhara
Masuo	Semi-Express (準急)	Kawagoe Tomisuhara
Express (急行): Does not stop at this station

== History ==
Ise-Asahi Station opened on January 30, 1929 as a station on the Ise Railway. The Ise Railway became the Sangu Express Electric Railway’s Ise Line on September 15, 1936, and was renamed the Nagoya Line on December 7, 1938. After merging with Osaka Electric Kido on March 15, 1941, the line became the Kansai Express Railway's Nagoya Line. This line was merged with the Nankai Electric Railway on June 1, 1944 to form Kintetsu.

== Passenger statistics ==
In fiscal 2019, the station was used by an average of 2196 passengers daily (boarding passengers only).

== Surrounding area ==
- Toshiba Mie Factory
- Japan National Route 1

== See also ==
- List of railway stations in Japan
