= Masuo =

- Gender: Male

Origin
- Origin: Japanese
- Meaning: Different meanings depending on the kanji used

Masuo (written: 益男, 斗雄 or 満寿夫) is a masculine Japanese given name. Notable people with the name include:

- Masuo Amada (天田 益男) (born 1958), Japanese actor and voice actor
- Asahikuni Masuo (旭國 斗雄) (born 1947), Japanese sumo wrestler
- Masuo Ikeda (池田 満寿夫) (1934–1997), Japanese artist, writer and film director

Masuo (written: 増尾) is also a Japanese surname. Notable people with the surname include:

- Jun Masuo (増尾 遵) (born 1986), Japanese actor

== See also ==
- Masuo Station (disambiguation), multiple train stations in Japan
