= Isoyama Station =

Railway station in Suzuka, Mie Prefecture, Japan

Isoyama Station 磯山駅
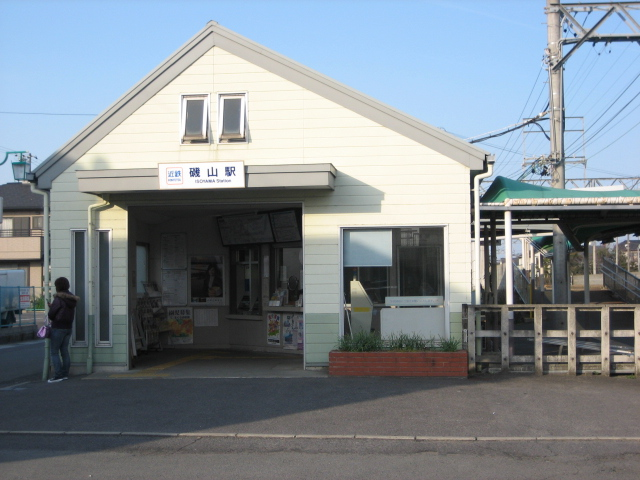
- Isoyama Station

General information
- Location: 2-12-16 Isoyama, Suzuka-shi, Mie-ken 510-0256; Japan
- Coordinates: 34°48′45″N 136°34′7″E
- Operator: Kintetsu Railway
- Line: Nagoya Line
- Distance: 56.0 km from Kintetsu Nagoya
- Platforms: 2 side platforms

Other information
- Station code: E33
- Website: Official website

History
- Opened: September 10, 1915

Passengers
- FY2019: 774 daily
Location
- Location within Mie Prefecture Location within Japan

Isoyama Station (磯山駅, Isoyama-eki) is a passenger railway station in located in the city of Suzuka, Mie Prefecture, Japan, operated by the private railway operator Kintetsu Railway.

== Lines ==
Isoyama Station is served by the Nagoya Line, and is located 56.0 rail kilometers from the starting point of the line at Kintetsu Nagoya Station.

== Station layout ==
The station was consists of two opposed side platforms, connected by a level crossing. The station is unattended.

=== Platforms ===
| 1 | ■ Nagoya Line | for Tsu, Toba, Osaka Namba, Kashikojima |
| 2 | ■ Nagoya Line | for Kintetsu Yokkaichi, Kuwana, Nagoya |

== Adjacent stations ==
| « | Service | » |
Nagoya Line
Express (急行): Does not stop at this station
| Tsuzumigaura | Local (普通) | Chisato |

== History ==
Isoyama Station opened on September 10, 1915 as a station on the Ise Railway. The Ise Railway became the Sangu Express Electric Railway’s Ise Line on September 15, 1936, and was renamed the Nagoya Line on December 7, 1938. After merging with Osaka Electric Kido on March 15, 1941, the line became the Kansai Express Railway's Nagoya Line. This line was merged with the Nankai Electric Railway on June 1, 1944 to form Kintetsu.

== Passenger statistics ==
In fiscal 2019, the station was used by an average of 774 passengers daily (boarding passengers only).

== Surrounding area ==
- Japan National Route 23
- Shin Tsuzumigaura housing complex
- Suzuka Isoyama Post Office

== See also ==
- List of railway stations in Japan
