= Kintetsu Nagashima Station =

Railway station in Kuwana, Mie Prefecture, Japan

Kintetsu-Nagashima Station 近鉄長島駅
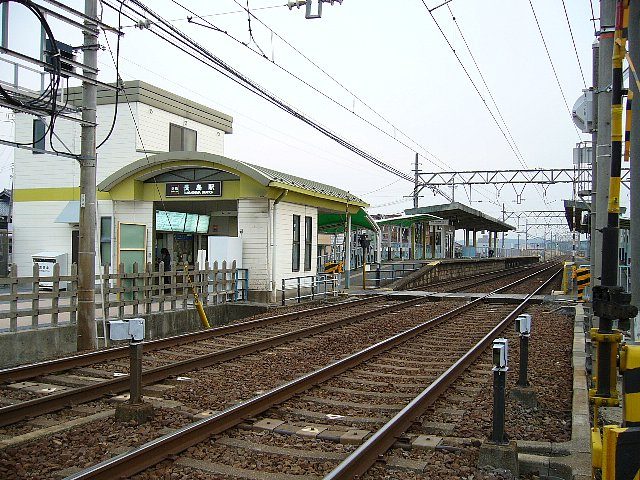
- Kintetsu-Nagashima Station

General information
- Location: 1648 Nagashima-cho Nishi-domo, Kuwana-shi, Mie-ken 511-1143; Japan
- Coordinates: 35°5′52.1″N 136°41′48.15″E
- Operator: Kintetsu Railway
- Line: Nagoya Line
- Distance: 19.5 km from Kintetsu Nagoya
- Platforms: 2 side platforms

Other information
- Station code: E12
- Website: Official website

History
- Opened: June 26, 1938
- Former names: Kinki Nippon-Nagashima (until 1970)

Passengers
- FY2019: 2196 daily
Location
- Location within Mie Prefecture Location within Japan

Kintetsu-Nagashima Station (近鉄長島駅, Kintetsu-Nagashima-eki) is a passenger railway station located in the city of Kuwana, Mie Prefecture, Japan, and is operated by the private railway operator Kintetsu Railway.

== Lines ==
Kintetsu-Nagashima Station is served by the Nagoya Line, and is located 19.5 rail kilometers from the starting point of the line at Kintetsu Nagoya Station.

== Station layout ==
The station consists of two opposed side platforms, connected by a level crossing.

=== Platforms ===
1	■ Nagoya Line	for Kuwana, Yokkaichi, Osaka, Toba and Kashikojima
2	■ Nagoya Line	for Yatomi and Nagoya

== Adjacent stations ==
«	Service	»
Kintetsu Nagoya Line
Express (急行): Does not stop at this station
Kintetsu Yatomi	Semi-Express (準急)	Kuwana
Kintetsu Yatomi	Local (普通)	Kuwana

== History ==
Kintetsu-Nagashima station opened on June 26, 1938 as Kankyu-Nagashima Station (関急長島駅, Kankyu-Nagashima eki) on the Kansai Express Electric Railway. On January 1, 1940, the Sangu Express Electric Railway and the Kansai Express Electric Railway merged, and the station was renamed Sangu-Nagashima Station (参急長島駅, Sangu-Nagashima eki). After merging with Osaka Electric Kido on March 15, 1941, the line became the Kansai Express Railway's Nagoya Line, and the station was again renamed back to its original name. This line was merged with the Nankai Electric Railway on June 1, 1944 to form Kintetsu, and the station renamed to Kinki Nippon Nagashima Station (近畿日本長島駅, Kinki Nippon Nagashima eki) The station name was shortened to its present name on March 1, 1970

== Passenger statistics ==
In fiscal 2019, the station was used by an average of 1665 passengers daily (boarding passengers only).

== Surrounding area ==
- JR Tokai Kansai Main Line Nagashima Station
- Nagashima Castle Ruins

== See also ==
- List of railway stations in Japan
