= Chisato Station (Mie) =

Railway station in Tsu, Mie Prefecture, Japan

Coordinates: 34°47′54.82″N 136°33′22.8″E

Chisato Station 千里駅
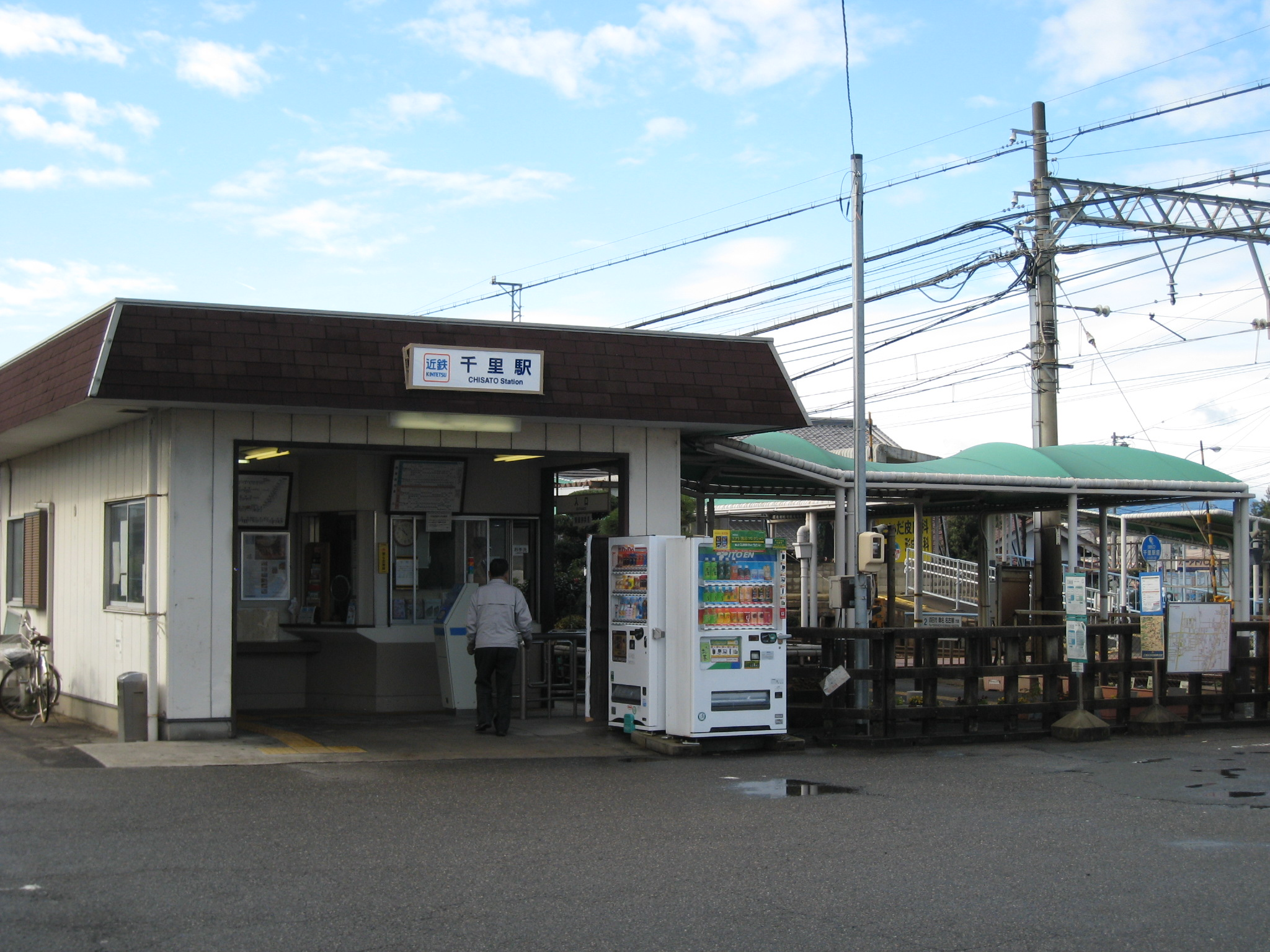
- Chisato Station

General information
- Location: 106-2 Kawage-cho Ueno, Tsu-shi, Mie-ken 510-0303; Japan
- Operator: Kintetsu Railway
- Line: Nagoya Line
- Distance: 57.9 km from Kintetsu Nagoya
- Platforms: 2 side platforms

Other information
- Station code: E34
- Website: Official website

History
- Opened: January 1, 1917

Passengers
- FY2019: 1638 daily
Location
- Location within Mie Prefecture Location within Japan

Chisato Station (千里駅, Chisato-eki) is a passenger railway station in located in the city of Tsu, Mie Prefecture, Japan, operated by the private railway operator Kintetsu Railway.

== Lines ==
Chisato Station is served by the Nagoya Line, and is located 57.9 rail kilometers from the starting point of the line at Kintetsu Nagoya Station.

== Station layout ==
The station was consists of two opposed side platforms, connected by a level crossing. The station is unattended.

=== Platforms ===
1	■ Nagoya Line	for Tsu, Toba,Osaka Namba, Kashikojima
2	■ Nagoya Line	for Kintetsu Yokkaichi, Kuwana, Nagoya

== Adjacent stations ==
«	Service	»
Nagoya Line
Express (急行): Does not stop at this station
Isoyama	Local (普通)	Toyotsu-Ueno

== History ==
Chisato Station opened on January 1, 1917, as a station on the Ise Railway. It was closed in October 1927. The station reopened on July 1, 1943, as a station on Kansai Express Railway's Nagoya Line. This line was merged with the Nankai Electric Railway on June 1, 1944, to form Kintetsu.

== Passenger statistics ==
In fiscal 2019, the station was used by an average of 1638 passengers daily (boarding passengers only).

== Surrounding area ==
- Marina Kawage
- Suzuka International University, Suzuka Junior College

== See also ==
- List of railway stations in Japan
