= Edobashi Station =

Railway station in Tsu, Mie Prefecture, Japan

Edobashi Station 江戸橋駅
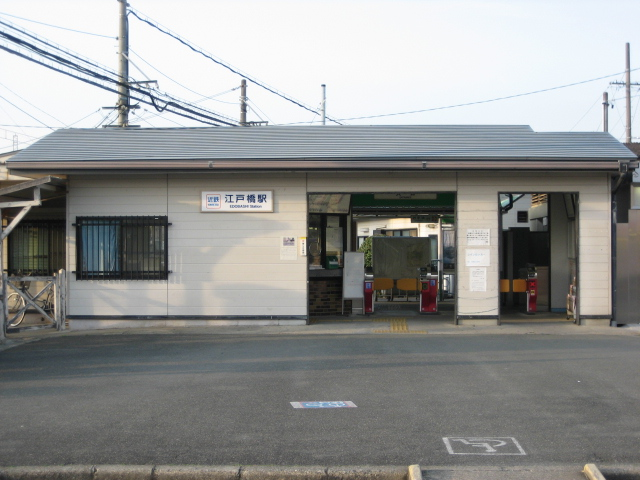
- Edobashi Station

General information
- Location: 3-137-1 Uehama-cho, Tsu-shi, Mie-ken 514-0008; Japan
- Coordinates: 34°44′37″N 136°30′50.6″E
- Operator: Kintetsu Railway
- Line: Nagoya Line
- Distance: 65.3 km from Kintetsu Nagoya
- Platforms: 2 island platforms

Other information
- Station code: E38
- Website: Official website

History
- Opened: January 1, 1917

Passengers
- FY2019: 5013 daily
Location
- Location within Mie Prefecture Location within Japan

"Edobashi Station" may also refer to Tokyo subway Nihombashi Station on Toei Asakusa Line, named "Edobashi" 1963 to 1989.

Edobashi Station (江戸橋駅, Edobashi-eki) is a passenger railway station in located in the city of Tsu, Mie Prefecture, Japan, operated by the private railway operator Kintetsu Railway.

== Lines ==
Edobashi Station is served by the Nagoya Line, and is located 65.3 rail kilometers from the starting point of the line at Kintetsu Nagoya Station.

== Station layout ==
The station was consists of two island platforms serving four tracks, connected by a level crossing.

=== Platforms ===
1, 2	■ Nagoya Line	for Tsu, Osaka Namba, Toba, and Kashikojima
3, 4	■ Nagoya Line	for Yokkaichi, Kuwana, and Nagoya

== Adjacent stations ==
«	Service	»
Nagoya Line
Shiroko	Express	Tsu
Takadahonzan	Local	Tsu

== History ==
Edobashi Station opened on January 1, 1917 as a station on the Ise Railway. The Ise Railway became the Ise Electric Railway on September 12, 1926, which merged with the Sangu Express Electric Railway on September 15, 1936. On March 15, 1941, the Sangu Express Electric Railway merged with Osaka Electric Railway to become a station on Kansai Express Railway's Nagoya Line. This line in turn was merged with the Nankai Electric Railway on June 1, 1944 to form Kintetsu. The station was relocated 100 meters north of its former location in June 1959.

== Passenger statistics ==
In fiscal 2019, the station was used by an average of 5013 passengers daily (boarding passengers only).

== Surrounding area ==
- Mie University
- Mie University Hospital
- Tsu City College

== See also ==
- List of railway stations in Japan
