= Kawagoe Tomisuhara Station =

Railway station in Kawagoe, Mie Prefecture, Japan

Kawagoe Tomisuhara Station 川越富洲原駅
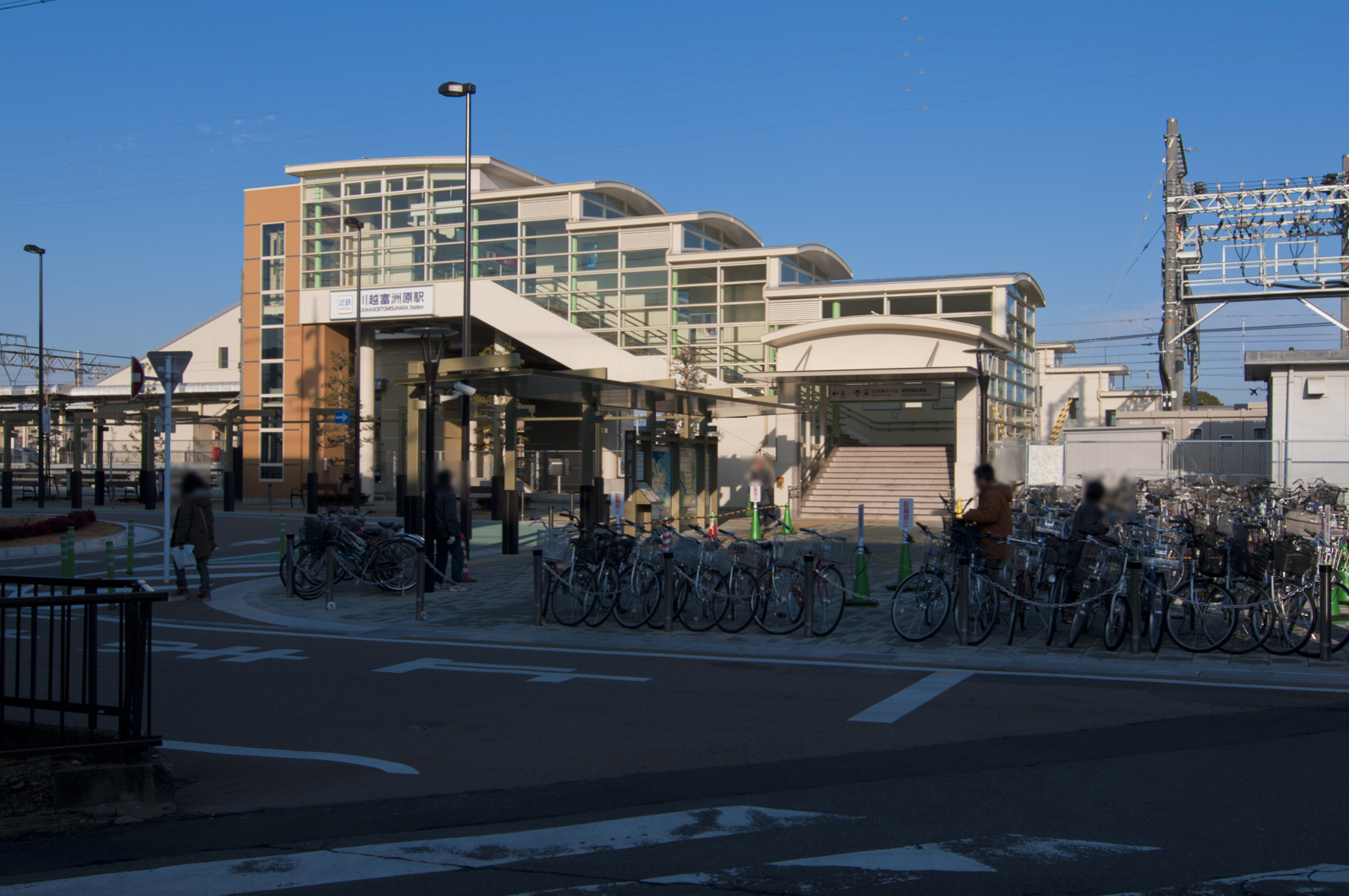
- Kawagoe Tomisuhara Station

General information
- Location: 275 Tomita, Kawagoe-cho, Mie-gun, Mie-ken 510-8122; Japan
- Coordinates: 35°0′59.59″N 136°39′37.66″E
- Operator: Kintetsu Railway
- Line: Nagoya Line
- Distance: 30.0 km from Kintetsu Nagoya
- Platforms: 2 island platforms

Other information
- Station code: E16
- Website: Official website

History
- Opened: January 30, 1929
- Former names: Tomitsuhara (until 2009)

Passengers
- FY2019: 3615 daily
Location
- Location within Mie Prefecture Location within Japan

Kawagoe Tomisuhara Station (川越富洲原駅, Kawagoe Tomisuhara-eki) is a passenger railway station in located in the town of Kawagoe, Mie District, Mie Prefecture, Japan, operated by the private railway operator Kintetsu Railway.

== Lines ==
Kawagoe Tomisuhara Station is served by the Nagoya Line, and is located 30.0 rail kilometers from the starting point of the line at Kintetsu Nagoya Station.

== Station layout ==
The station consists of two island platforms serving four lines connected by a footbridge.

=== Platforms ===
1, 2	■ Nagoya Line	for Yokkaichi, Osaka and Kashikojima
3, 4	■ Nagoya Line	for Kuwana and Nagoya

== Adjacent stations ==
«	Service	»
Nagoya Line
Ise-Asahi	Local (普通)	Kintetsu Tomida
Ise-Asahi	Semi-Express (準急)	Kintetsu Tomida
Express (急行): Does not stop at this station

== History ==
Kawagoe Tomisuhara Station opened on January 30, 1929 as Tomitsuhara Station (富洲原駅, Tomitsuhara-eki) on the Ise Railway. The Ise Railway became the Sangu Express Electric Railway's Ise Line on September 15, 1936, and was renamed the Nagoya Line on December 7, 1938. After merging with Osaka Electric Kido on March 15, 1941, the line became the Kansai Express Railway's Nagoya Line. This line was merged with the Nankai Electric Railway on June 1, 1944 to form Kintetsu. As a part of the development project around the station and in compliance with the request by the Kawagoe town government, it was renamed on March 20, 2009, the day of the opening of the Hanshin Railway Hanshin Namba Line.

== Passenger statistics ==
In fiscal 2019, the station was used by an average of 3615 passengers daily (boarding passengers only).

== Surrounding area ==
- Kawagoe Power Station
- Mie Prefectural Kawagoe High School
- Yokkaichi City Tomisuhara Junior High School
- Yokkaichi City Tomisuhara Elementary School

== See also ==
- List of railway stations in Japan
