= Asahi, Mie =

Asahi 朝日町
- Town
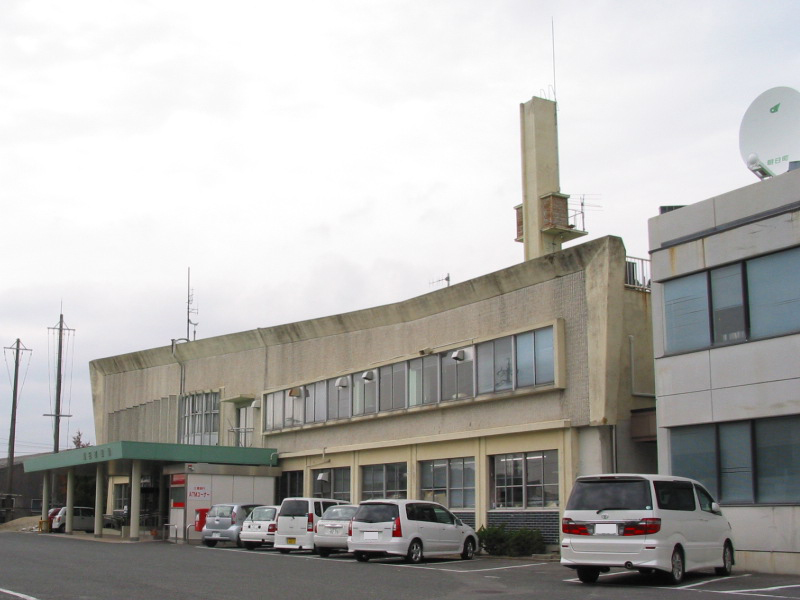
- Asahi Town Office

- Flag Emblem

- Location of Asahi in Mie Prefecture

- Coordinates: 35°2′N 136°40′E
- Country: Japan
- Region: Kansai
- Prefecture: Mie
- District: Mie

Area
  - Total: 5.99 km^{2} (2.31 sq mi)

Population (August 2021)
  - Total: 11,041
  - Density: 1,840/km^{2} (4,770/sq mi)
- Time zone: UTC+9 (Japan Standard Time)
- Tree: white Prunus
- Flower: Sunflower
- Bird: Japanese bush warbler
- Phone number: 059-377-5651
- Address: 893 Komukai, Asahi-chō, Mie-gun, Mie-ken 510-8522
- Website: Official website

Asahi (朝日町, Asahi-chō) is a town located in Mie Prefecture, Japan. As of 1 September 2021, the town had an estimated population of 11,041 in 4247 households and a population density of 1800 persons per km^{2}. The total area of the town was 5.99 square kilometres (2.31 sq mi).

== Geography ==
Asahi is located in northeastern Mie Prefecture. It is the smallest municipality in Mie Prefecture in terms of area.

=== Neighboring municipalities ===
Mie Prefecture

- Kawagoe
- Kuwana
- Yokkaichi

== Climate ==
Asahi has a humid subtropical climate (Köppen Cfa) characterized by warm summers and cool winters with light to no snowfall. The average annual temperature in Asahi is 14.9 °C. The average annual rainfall is 1656 mm with September as the wettest month. The temperatures are highest on average in August, at around 26.6 °C, and lowest in January, at around 3.5 °C.

== Demographics ==
Per Japanese census data, the population of Asahi has increased rapidly over the past 20 years.

Historical population
Year	Pop.	±%
1960	5,543	—
1970	6,800	+22.7%
1980	6,851	+0.8%
1990	6,744	−1.6%
2000	6,716	−0.4%
2010	9,627	+43.3%

== History ==
Asahi has been inhabited since at least the Yayoi period, and was the location of one of the battles of the Jinshin War during the Asuka period. During the Meiji period, Asahi was one of the villages established within Asake District of Mie Prefecture with the establishment of the modern municipalities system on April 1, 1889. Asake District was abolished in 1896, and merged with Mie District. Asahi village was raised to town status on October 17, 1957.

== Government ==
Asahi has a mayor-council form of government with a directly elected mayor and a unicameral city council of 11 members. Asahi, collectively with the other municipalities of Mie District, contributes two members to the Mie Prefectural Assembly. In terms of national politics, the town is part of Mie 3rd district of the lower house of the Diet of Japan.

== Economy ==
The local economy is dominated by a large factory owned by Toshiba, which (together with subsidiaries companies) employs over half of the local workforce.

== Education ==
Asahi has one public elementary school and one public middle school operated by the town government. The town does not have a high school.

== Transportation ==
=== Railway ===
JR Tōkai – Kansai Main Line

- Asahi

Kintetsu Railway Kintetsu Railway – Nagoya Line

- Ise-Asahi

=== Highway ===
- Isewangan Expressway
- National Route 1

== Notable people ==
- Akihiro Sato, professional soccer player
