= Nagashima Station =

Railway station in Kuwana, Mie Prefecture, Japan

CJ06 Nagashima Station 長島駅
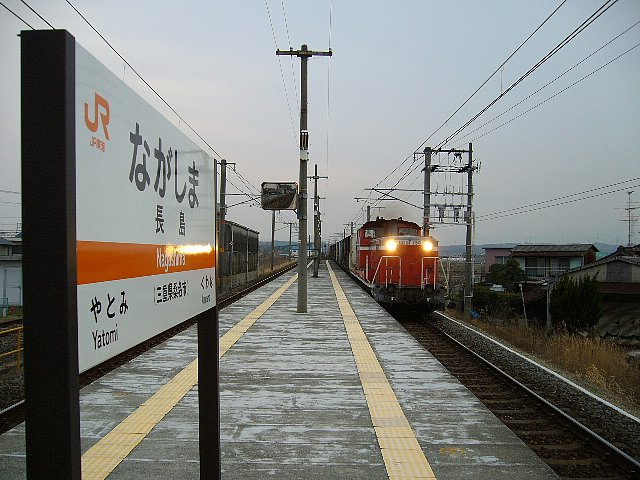
- JR Nagashima Station

General information
- Location: Nagashima-cho Nishi-sotomen 1447, Kuwana-shi, Mie-ken; Japan
- Coordinates: 35°5′54.4″N 136°41′46.75″E
- Operator: JR Tōkai
- Line: Kansai Main Line
- Distance: 19.6 km from Nagoya
- Platforms: 1 island platform
- Connections: Bus terminal

Other information
- Station code: CJ06

History
- Opened: July 5, 1894

Passengers
- FY2019: 570 daily
Location
- Location within Mie Prefecture Location within Japan

Nagashima Station (長島駅, Nagashima-eki) is a passenger railway station in located in the city of Kuwana, Mie Prefecture, Japan, operated by Central Japan Railway Company (JR Tōkai).

== Lines ==
Nagashima Station is served by the Kansai Main Line, and is 19.6 rail kilometers from the terminus of the line at Nagoya Station.

== Station layout ==
The station consists of one island platform, with no station building. The station is unattended.

=== Platforms ===
1	■ Kansai Main Line	For Kuwana, Yokkaichi, Kameyama
2	■ Kansai Main Line	For Nagoya

== Adjacent stations ==
«	Service	»
Central Japan Railway Company (JR Central)
Kansai Main Line
Yatomi	Local	Kuwana
Semi Rapid: Does not stop at this station
Rapid: Does not stop at this station
Rapid "Mie": Does not stop at this station
Limited Express "Nanki": Does not stop at this station

== Station history ==
Nagashima Station was opened on November 11, 1899 as a station on the Kansai Railway. The Kansai Railway was nationalized on October 1, 1907 becoming part of the Japanese Government Railways (JGR). The JGR became the Japan National Railways (JNR) after World War II. The station has been unattended since October 1, 1970. The station was absorbed into the JR Central network upon the privatization of the JNR on April 1, 1987.

Station numbering was introduced to the section of the Kansai Main Line operated JR Central in March 2018; Nagashima Station was assigned station number CI06.

== Passenger statistics ==
In fiscal 2019, the station was used by an average of 570 passengers daily (boarding passengers only).

== Surrounding area ==
- Nagashima Castle ruins
- Kuwana City Nagashima Town General Branch
- Kintetsu Nagashima Station

== See also ==
- List of railway stations in Japan
