= Toyotsu-Ueno Station =

Railway station in Tsu, Mie Prefecture, Japan

Toyotsu-Ueno Station 豊津上野駅
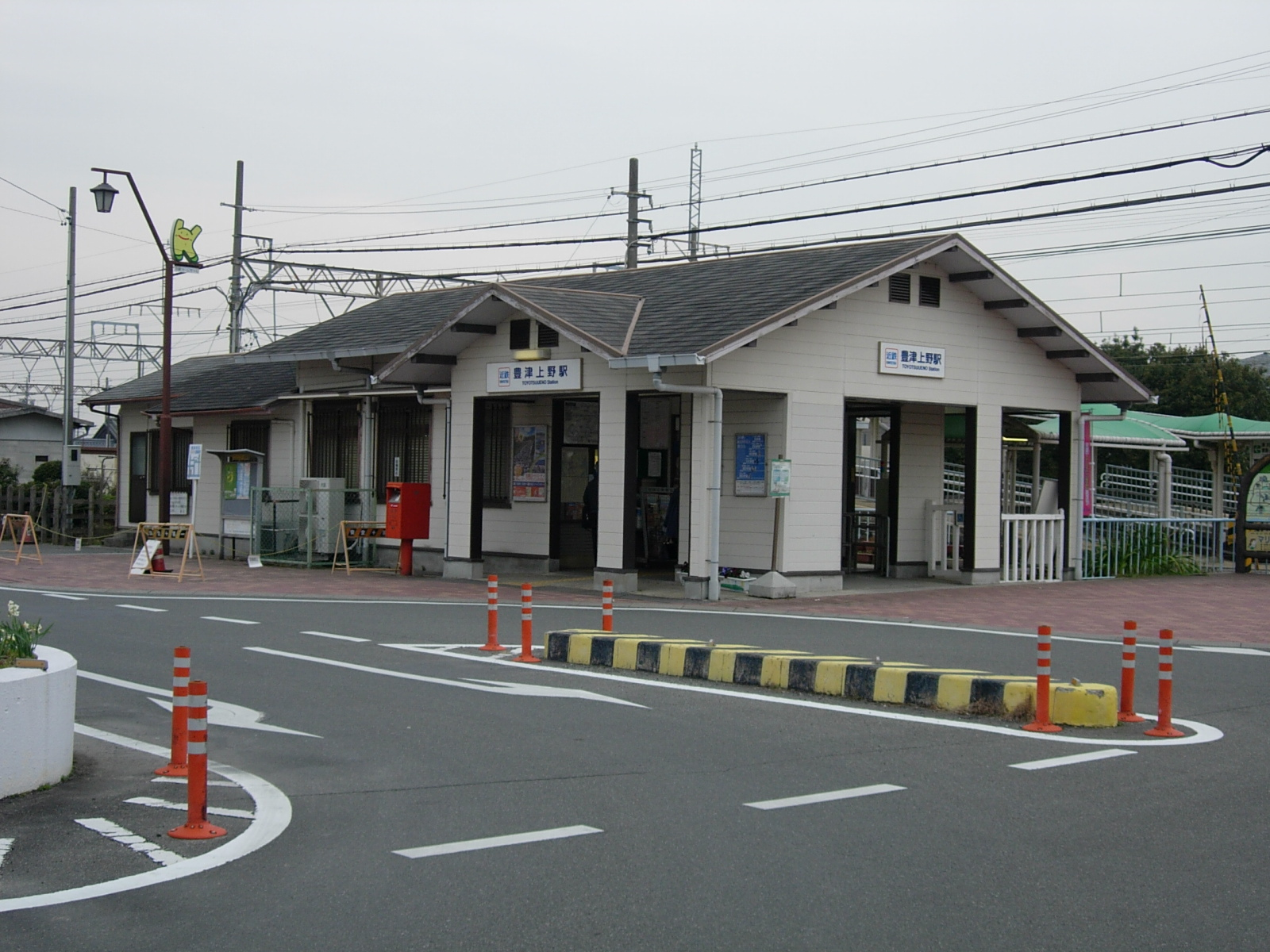
- Toyotsu-Ueno Station

General information
- Location: 1581-1 Kawage-cho Nakabeppo, Tsu-shi, Mie-ken 510-0305; Japan
- Coordinates: 34°47′7.88″N 136°32′37.38″E
- Operator: Kintetsu Railway
- Line: Nagoya Line
- Distance: 59.8 km from Kintetsu Nagoya
- Platforms: 2 island platforms

Other information
- Station code: E35
- Website: Official website

History
- Opened: May 8, 1944

Passengers
- FY2019: 672 daily
Location
- Location within Mie Prefecture Location within Japan

Toyotsu-Ueno Station (豊津上野駅, Toyotsu-Ueno-eki) is a passenger railway station in located in the city of Tsu, Mie Prefecture, Japan, operated by the private railway operator Kintetsu Railway.

== Lines ==
Toyotsu-Ueno Station is served by the Nagoya Line, and is located 59.8 rail kilometers from the starting point of the line at Kintetsu Nagoya Station.

== Station layout ==
The station was consists of two island platforms, connected by a level crossing.

=== Platforms ===
1, 2	■ Nagoya Line	for Tsu, Toba,Osaka Namba, Kashikojima
3, 4	■ Nagoya Line	for Kintetsu Yokkaichi, Kuwana, Nagoya

== Adjacent stations ==
«	Service	»
Nagoya Line
Express (急行): Does not stop at this station
Chisato	Local (普通)	Shiratsuka

== History ==
Toyotsu-Ueno Station opened on May 8, 1944 as a station on Kansai Express Railway's Nagoya Line. This line was merged with the Nankai Electric Railway on June 1, 1944 to form Kintetsu.

== Passenger statistics ==
In fiscal 2019, the station was used by an average of 672 passengers daily (boarding passengers only).

== Surrounding area ==
- Honjiroyama Youth Park (Ueno Castle Ruins)
- former Kawage Town Hall
- Kawage fishing port

== See also ==
- List of railway stations in Japan
