= Kawaramachi Station (Mie) =

Railway station in Yokkaichi, Mie Prefecture, Japan

Kawaramachi Station 川原町駅
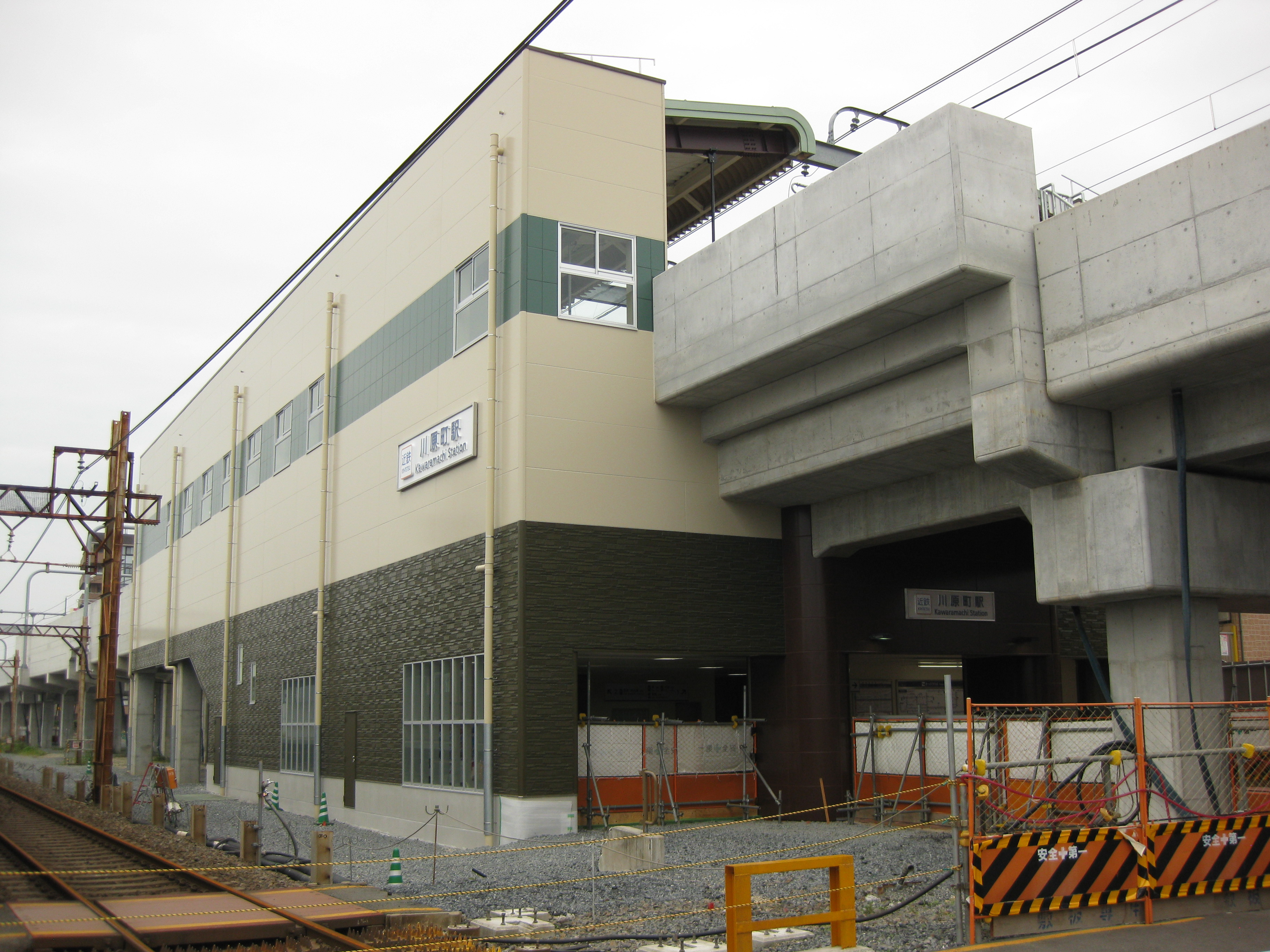
- Kawaramachi Station

General information
- Location: 1-1 Hongō-chō, Yokkaichi-shi, Mie-ken 510-0034; Japan
- Coordinates: 34°58′36.02″N 136°37′22.31″E
- Operator: Kintetsu Railway
- Line: Nagoya Line
- Distance: 35.7 km from Kintetsu Nagoya
- Platforms: 2 side platforms

Other information
- Station code: E2o
- Website: Official website

History
- Opened: January 30, 1929

Passengers
- FY2019: 847 daily
Location
- Location within Mie Prefecture Location within Japan

Kawaramachi Station (川原町駅, Kawaramachi-eki) is a passenger railway station in located in the city of Yokkaichi, Mie Prefecture, Japan, operated by the private railway operator Kintetsu Railway.

== Lines ==
Kawaramachi Station is served by the Nagoya Line, and is located 35.7 rail kilometers from the starting point of the line at Kintetsu Nagoya Station.

== Station layout ==
The station consists of two opposed side platforms, connected by a level crossing.

is a railway station on the Nagoya Line in Yokkaichi, Mie Prefecture, Japan, operated by the private railway operator Kintetsu Railway. Kawaramachi Station is 35.7 rail kilometers from the terminus of the line at Kintetsu Nagoya Station.

== Line ==
- Kintetsu Nagoya Line

== Station layout ==
Kawaramachi Station has two opposed elevated side platforms with the station building underneath.

=== Platforms ===
1	■ Nagoya Line	for Tsu, Osaka and Kashikojima
2	■ Nagoya Line	for Kuwana and Nagoya

== Adjacent stations ==
«	Service	»
Kintetsu Nagoya Line
Akuragawa	Local	Kintetsu Yokkaichi
Akuragawa	Semi-Express	Kintetsu Yokkaichi
Express: Does not stop at this station

== History ==
Kawaramachi Station opened on January 30, 1929, as a station on the Ise Railway. The Ise Railway became the Sangu Express Electric Railway’s Ise Line on September 15, 1936, and was renamed the Nagoya Line on December 7, 1938. After merging with Osaka Electric Kido on March 15, 1941, the line became the Kansai Express Railway's Nagoya Line. This line was merged with the Nankai Electric Railway on June 1, 1944, to form Kintetsu.

== Passenger statistics ==
In fiscal 2019, the station was used by an average of 847 passengers daily (boarding passengers only).

== Surrounding area ==
- Banko no Sato Kaikan

== See also ==
- List of railway stations in Japan
