= Nagonoura Station =

Railway station in Suzuka, Mie Prefecture, Japan

Nagonoura Station 長太ノ浦駅
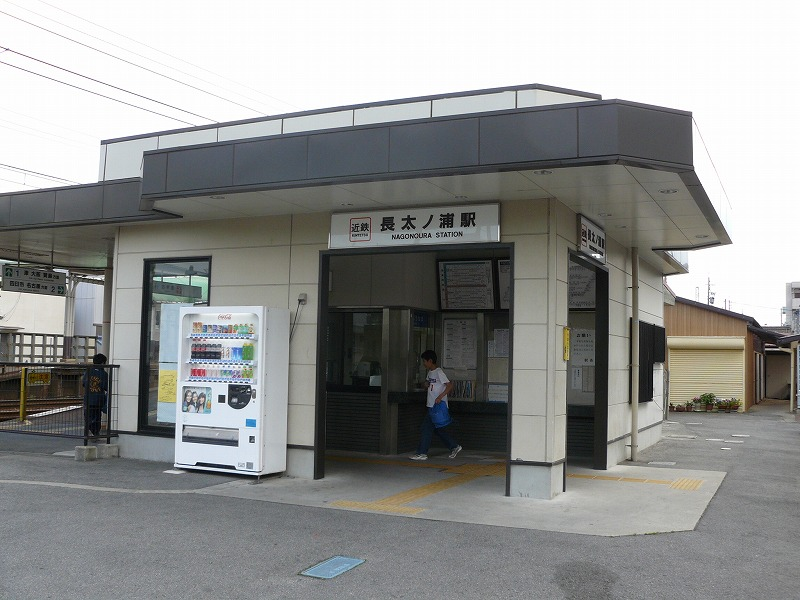
- Nagonoura Station

General information
- Location: 2-18-19 Naganoura, Suzuka-shi, Mie-ken 513-0043; Japan
- Coordinates: 34°53′30.95″N 136°37′35.09″E
- Operator: Kintetsu Railway
- Line: Nagoya Line
- Distance: 56.0 km from Kintetsu Nagoya
- Platforms: 2 side platforms

Other information
- Station code: E27
- Website: Official website

History
- Opened: July 1, 1943

Passengers
- FY2019: 709 daily
Location
- Location within Mie Prefecture Location within Japan

Nagonoura Station (長太ノ浦駅, Nagonoura-eki) is a passenger railway station in located in the city of Suzuka, Mie Prefecture, Japan, operated by the private railway operator Kintetsu Railway.

== Lines ==
Nagonoura Station is served by the Nagoya Line, and is located 45.6 rail kilometers from the starting point of the line at Kintetsu Nagoya Station.

== Station layout ==
The station consists of two opposed side platforms, connected by a level crossing. The station is unattended.

=== Platforms ===
1	■ Nagoya Line	for Tsu, Osaka and Kashikojima
2	■ Nagoya Line	for Yokkaichi and Nagoya

== Adjacent stations ==
«	Service	»
Kintetsu Nagoya Line
Kusu	Local	Mida
Express: Does not stop at this station

== History ==
Naganoura Station opened on July 1, 1943 as a station on the Kansai Express Railway's Nagoya Line. This line was merged with the Nankai Electric Railway on June 1, 1944 to form Kintetsu. It replaced an earlier station of the same name on the Ise Railway, which had been closed in October 1928.

== Passenger statistics ==
In fiscal 2019, the station was used by an average of 709 passengers daily (boarding passengers only).

== Surrounding area ==
- Suzuka fishing port
- Suzuka City Chota Elementary School

== See also ==
- List of railway stations in Japan
