= Miyamado Station =

Railway station in Yokkaichi, Mie Prefecture, Japan

Miyamado Station 海山道駅
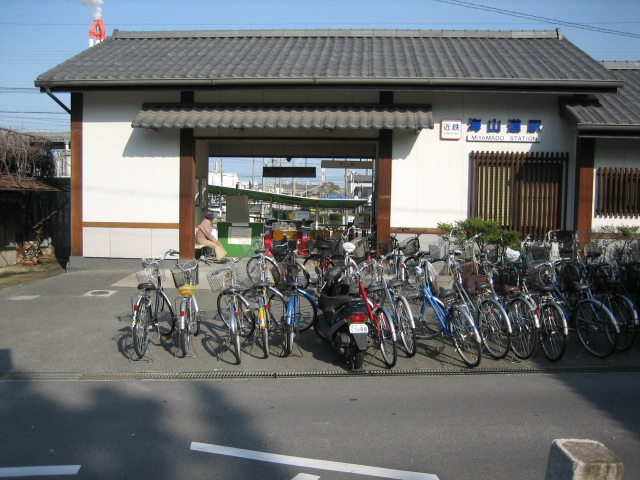
- Miyamado Station

General information
- Location: 2-80-1 Miyamado, Yokkaichi-shi, Mie-ken 510-0845; Japan
- Coordinates: 34°56′34.48″N 136°37′22.39″E
- Operator: Kintetsu Railway
- Line: Nagoya Line
- Distance: 39.6 km from Kintetsu Nagoya
- Platforms: 2 side platforms

Other information
- Station code: E23
- Website: Official website

History
- Opened: October 25, 1919

Passengers
- FY2019: 1028 daily
Location
- Location within Mie Prefecture Location within Japan

Miyamado Station (海山道駅, Miyamado-eki) is a passenger railway station in located in the city of Yokkaichi, Mie Prefecture, Japan, operated by the private railway operator Kintetsu Railway.

== Lines ==
Miyamado Station is served by the Nagoya Line, and is located 39.6 rail kilometers from the starting point of the line at Kintetsu Nagoya Station.

== Station layout ==
The station consists of two opposed side platforms, connected by a level crossing.

=== Platforms ===
1	■ Nagoya Line	for Tsu andIse-Nakagawa
2	■ Nagoya Line	for Yokkaichi and Nagoya

== Adjacent stations ==
«	Service	»
Kintetsu Nagoya Line
Shinshō	Local	Shiohama
Express: Does not stop at this station

== History ==
Miyamado Station opened on October 25, 1919 as a station on the Ise Railway. The Ise Railway became the Sangu Express Electric Railway’s Ise Line on September 15, 1936, and was renamed the Nagoya Line on December 7, 1938. After merging with Osaka Electric Kido on March 15, 1941, the line became the Kansai Express Railway's Nagoya Line. This line was merged with the Nankai Electric Railway on June 1, 1944 to form Kintetsu.

== Passenger statistics ==
In fiscal 2019, the station was used by an average of 1028 passengers daily (boarding passengers only).

== Surrounding area ==
- Miyamado Inari Shrine
- Yokkaichi City Mihama Elementary School

== See also ==
- List of railway stations in Japan
