= Kusu Station =

Railway station in Yokkaichi, Mie Prefecture, Japan

Kusu Station 楠駅
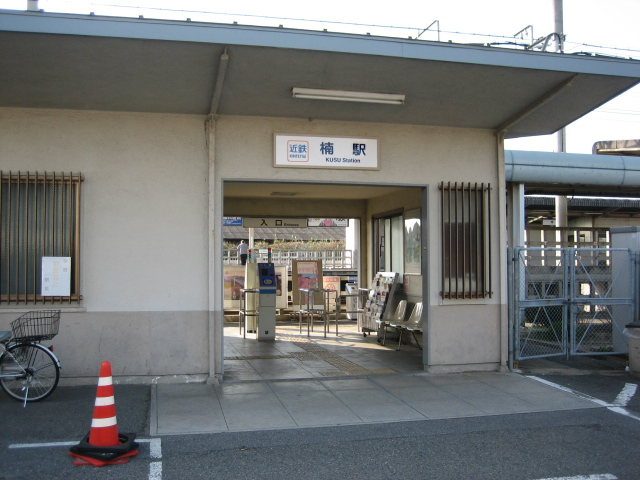
- Kusu Station

General information
- Location: 22 Minamigawa Kusu-cho, Yokkaichi-shi, Mie-ken 510-0105; Japan
- Coordinates: 34°54′15.81″N 136°37′52.1″E
- Operator: Kintetsu Railway
- Line: Nagoya Line
- Distance: 44.2 km from Kintetsu Nagoya
- Platforms: 2 side platforms

Other information
- Station code: E26
- Website: Official website

History
- Opened: December 22, 1917

Passengers
- FY2019: 913 daily
Location
- Location within Mie Prefecture Location within Japan

Kusu Station (楠駅, Kusu-eki) is a passenger railway station in located in the city of Yokkaichi, Mie Prefecture, Japan, operated by the private railway operator Kintetsu Railway.

== Lines ==
Kusu Station is served by the Nagoya Line, and is located 44.2 rail kilometers from the starting point of the line at Kintetsu Nagoya Station.

== Station layout ==
The station consists of two opposed side platforms, connected by an underground passage. There are two pass-only tracks between the two platforms.

=== Platforms ===
1	■ Nagoya Line	for Tsu and Ise-Nakagawa
2	■ Nagoya Line	Pass only
3	■ Nagoya Line	Pass only
4	■ Nagoya Line	for Yokkaichi, Kuwana and Nagoya

== Adjacent stations ==
«	Service	»
Kintetsu Nagoya Line
Kita-Kusu	Local	Nagonoura
Express: Does not stop at this station

== History ==
Kusu Station opened on December 22, 1917 as a station on the Ise Railway. The Ise Railway became the Sangu Express Electric Railway’s Ise Line on September 15, 1936, and was renamed the Nagoya Line on December 7, 1938. After merging with Osaka Electric Kido on March 15, 1941, the line became the Kansai Express Railway's Nagoya Line. This line was merged with the Nankai Electric Railway on June 1, 1944 to form Kintetsu.

== Passenger statistics ==
In fiscal 2019, the station was used by an average of 913 passengers daily (boarding passengers only).

== Surrounding area ==
- Takara Holdings
- Kusu Post Office
- Kusu fishing port

== See also ==
- List of railway stations in Japan
