= Kita-Kusu Station =

Railway station in Yokkaichi, Mie Prefecture, Japan

Kita-Kusu Station 北楠駅
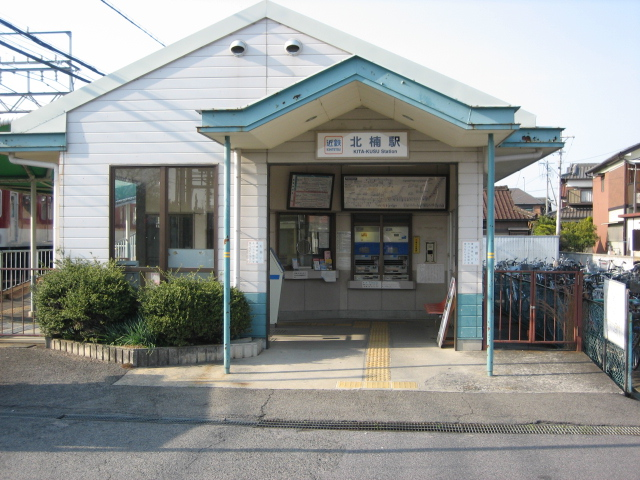
- Kita-Kusu Station

General information
- Location: 2048 Kitagomizuka Kusu-cho, Yokkaichi-shi, Mie-ken 510-0103; Japan
- Coordinates: 34°54′57.79″N 136°37′30.1″E
- Operator: Kintetsu Railway
- Line: Nagoya Line
- Distance: 42.6 km from Kintetsu Nagoya
- Platforms: 2 side platforms

Other information
- Station code: E25
- Website: Official website

History
- Opened: April 1, 1920

Passengers
- FY2019: 1039 daily
Location
- Location within Mie Prefecture Location within Japan

Kita-Kusu Station (北楠駅, Kita-Kusu-eki) is a passenger railway station in located in the city of Yokkaichi, Mie Prefecture, Japan, operated by the private railway operator Kintetsu Railway.

== Lines ==
Kita-Kusu Station is served by the Nagoya Line, and is located 42.6 rail kilometers from the starting point of the line at Kintetsu Nagoya Station.

== Station layout ==
The station consists of two opposed side platforms, connected by a level crossing.

=== Platforms ===
1	■ Nagoya Line	for Tsu and Ise-Nakagawa
2	■ Nagoya Line	for Yokkaichi, Kuwana and Nagoya

== Adjacent stations ==
«	Service	»
Kintetsu Nagoya Line
Shiohama	Local	Kusu
Express: Does not stop at this station

== History ==
Kita-Kusu Station opened on April 1, 1920 as a station on the Ise Railway. It was closed on September 16, 1926, but reopened on June 30, 1934. The Ise Railway became the Sangu Express Electric Railway’s Ise Line on September 15, 1936, and was renamed the Nagoya Line on December 7, 1938. After merging with Osaka Electric Kido on March 15, 1941, the line became the Kansai Express Railway's Nagoya Line. This line was merged with the Nankai Electric Railway on June 1, 1944 to form Kintetsu.

== Passenger statistics ==
In fiscal 2019, the station was used by an average of 1039 passengers daily (boarding passengers only).

== Surrounding area ==
- former Kusunoki Town Hall

Toyobo Kusu Factory Yokkaichi Kusu Junior High School Yokkaichi Kusu Elementary School

== See also ==
- List of railway stations in Japan
