= Masuo Station (Mie) =

Railway station in Kuwana, Mie Prefecture, Japan

Coordinates: 35°3′32.2″N 136°40′44.2″E

Masuo Station 益生駅
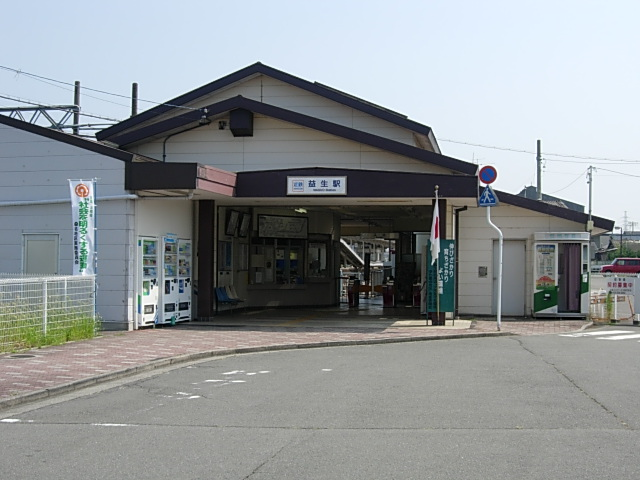
- Masuo Station

General information
- Location: 771 Yada, Kuwana, Mie （三重県桑名市大字矢田771） Japan
- Operator: Kintetsu Railway
- Line: Nagoya Line

History
- Opened: 1929
- Former names: Nishi-Kuwana (until 1930)

Passengers
- FY2016: 2,628 daily
Location

Masuo Station (益生駅, Masuo-eki) is a railway station on the Nagoya Line in Kuwana, Mie Prefecture, Japan, operated by the private railway operator Kintetsu Railway. Masuo Station is 24.8 rail kilometers from the terminus of the line at Kintetsu Nagoya Station.

== Line ==
- Kintetsu Nagoya Line

== Station layout ==
Masuo Station has a single island platform serving 2 tracks, with 1 passing track for Yokkaichi without platform.

=== Platforms ===
1	■ Nagoya Line	Pass only

2	■ Nagoya Line	for Yokkaichi, Osaka and Kashikojima
3	■ Nagoya Line	for Kuwana and Nagoya

== Adjacent stations ==
«	Service	»
Nagoya Line
Kuwana	Local	Ise-Asahi
Kuwana	Semi-Express	Ise-Asahi
Express: Does not stop at this station

== History ==
Masuo Station opened on January 30, 1929 as Nishi-Kuwana Station (西桑名駅, Nishi Kuwana eki) on the Ise Railway. It was renamed to its present name in 1930. The Ise Railway became the Sangu Express Electric Railway’s Ise Line on September 15, 1936, and was renamed the Nagoya Line on December 7, 1938. After merging with Osaka Electric Kido on March 15, 1941, the line became the Kansai Express Railway's Nagoya Line. This line was merged with the Nankai Electric Railway on June 1, 1944 to form Kintetsu.
