= Suzuka University of Medical Science =

Coordinates: 34°51′31.1″N 136°35′57″E

Suzuka University of Medical Science (鈴鹿医療科学大学, Suzuka iryō kagaku daigaku) is a private university in Suzuka, Mie, Japan, established in 1991 with the support of the Japan Association of Radiological Technologists, as well as the Mie prefecture, Suzuka city and the Japan Industries Association of Radiation Apparatus (currently the Japan Medical Imaging and Radiological Systems Industries Association). The present name was adopted in 1998. In 2008, it opened the Department of Pharmacy in its new Shiroko campus. In 2021, the university established the Sakura-no-mori Hospital of Palliative Care at the same campus. In total, it has four faculties as of October 2026: Health Science, Medical Engineering, Pharmaceutical Sciences, and Nursing. According to EduRank, it is the 362nd best university in Japan (out of 719 universities) and the best in Suzuka (out of 2 universities).

== Structure ==
The Suzuka University of Medical Science is organised into the following faculties, departments, courses and graduate schools:

- Faculty of health science
  - Department of radiological technology
  - Department of clinical nutrition
  - Department of medical technology
  - Department of rehabilitation
    - Physical therapy course
    - Occupational therapy course
  - Department of medical welfare
    - Clinical welfare course
    - Clinical psychology course
  - Department of acupuncture and moxibustion medical science
  - Department of emergency medical science
- Faculty of medical engineering
  - Department of clinical engineering
  - Department of health data science
- Faculty of pharmaceutical sciences
  - Department of pharmacy
  - Department of pharmaceutical sciences
- Faculty of nursing
  - Department of nursing
- Graduate School of health science
  - Division of health science
- Graduate School of pharmaceutical sciences
  - Division of clinical pharmacy and pharmaceutical sciences

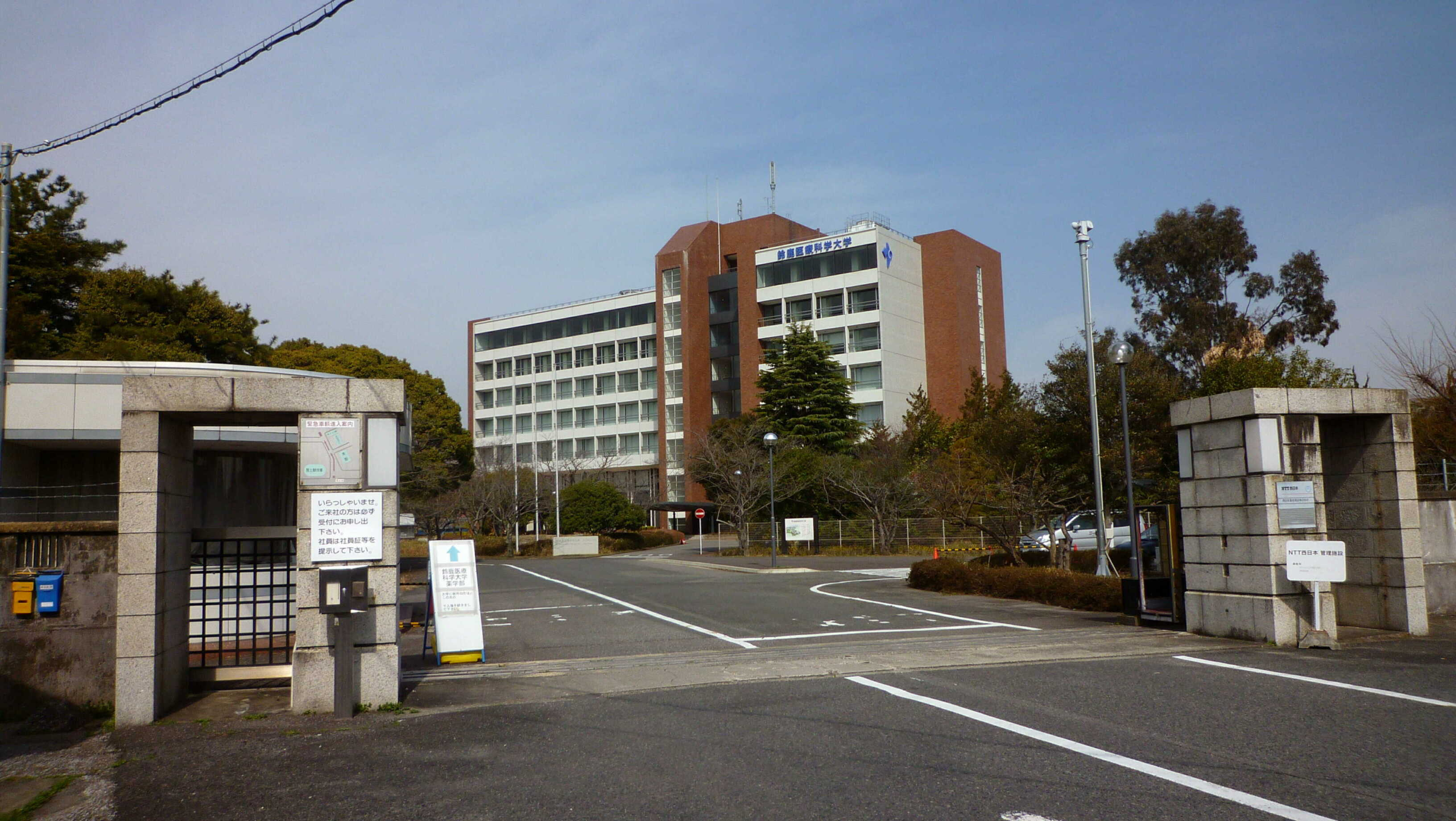
Suzuka University of Medical Science
