= Kasumigaura Station =

Railway station in Yokkaichi, Mie Prefecture, Japan

Kasumigaura Station 霞ヶ浦駅
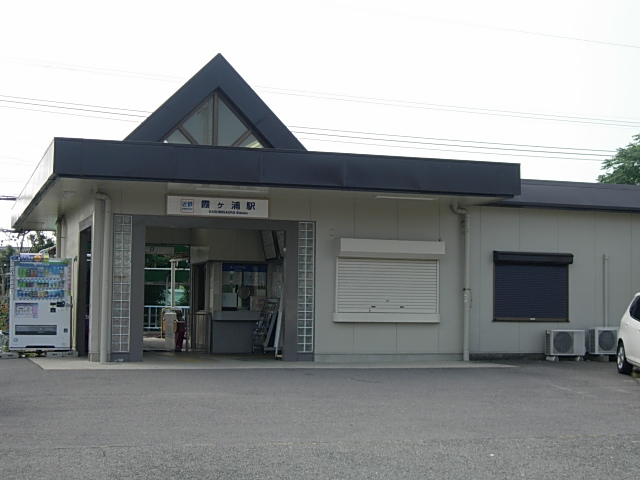
- Kasumigaura Station

General information
- Location: 1-14-2 Hatta-chō, Yokkaichi-shi, Mie-ken 510-0001; Japan
- Coordinates: 34°59′34.17″N 136°38′11.68″E
- Operator: Kintetsu Railway
- Line: Nagoya Line
- Distance: 33.5 km from Kintetsu Nagoya
- Platforms: 2 side platforms

Other information
- Station code: E18
- Website: Official website

History
- Opened: January 30, 1929; 97 years ago
- Former names: Hazu (until 1950)

Passengers
- FY2019: 2142 daily
Location
- Location within Mie Prefecture Location within Japan

Kasumigaura Station (霞ヶ浦駅, Kasumigaura-eki) is a passenger railway station in located in the city of Yokkaichi, Mie Prefecture, Japan, operated by the private railway operator Kintetsu Railway.

== Lines ==
Kasumigaura Station is served by the Nagoya Line, and is located 33.5 rail kilometers from the starting point of the line at Kintetsu Nagoya Station.

== Station layout ==
The station consists of two opposed side platforms, connected by a level crossing.

=== Platforms ===
| 1 | ■ Nagoya Line | for Yokkaichi, Osaka and Kashikojima |
| 2 | ■ Nagoya Line | for Kuwana and Nagoya |

== Adjacent stations ==
| « | Service | » |
Kintetsu Nagoya Line
Express (急行): Does not stop at this station
| Kintetsu Tomida | Semi-Express (準急) | Akuragawa |
| Kintetsu Tomida | Local (普通) | Akuragawa |

== History ==
Kasumigaura Station opened on January 30, 1929 as Hazu Station (羽津駅, Hazu-eki), on the Ise Railway. The original Kasumigaura Station was a provisional station located 500 meters away in the direction of Nagoya, October 28 of the same year. and was opened on The Ise Railway became the Sangu Express Electric Railway's Ise Line on September 15, 1936 at which time the original Kasumigaura Station was elevated in status to that of a full station. The line was renamed the Nagoya Line on December 7, 1938. After merging with Osaka Electric Kido on March 15, 1941, the line became the Kansai Express Railway's Nagoya Line. The original Kasumigaura Station was closed on October 23, 1943. The Kansai Express was merged with the Nankai Electric Railway on June 1, 1944 to form Kintetsu. Hazu Station was renamed to its present name on June 5, 1950.

== Passenger statistics ==
In fiscal 2019, the station was used by an average of 2142 passengers daily (boarding passengers only).

== Surrounding area ==
- Yokkaichi Dome

== See also ==
- List of railway stations in Japan
