= Kintetsu Nagoya Line =

Railway line in Japan

Nagoya Line

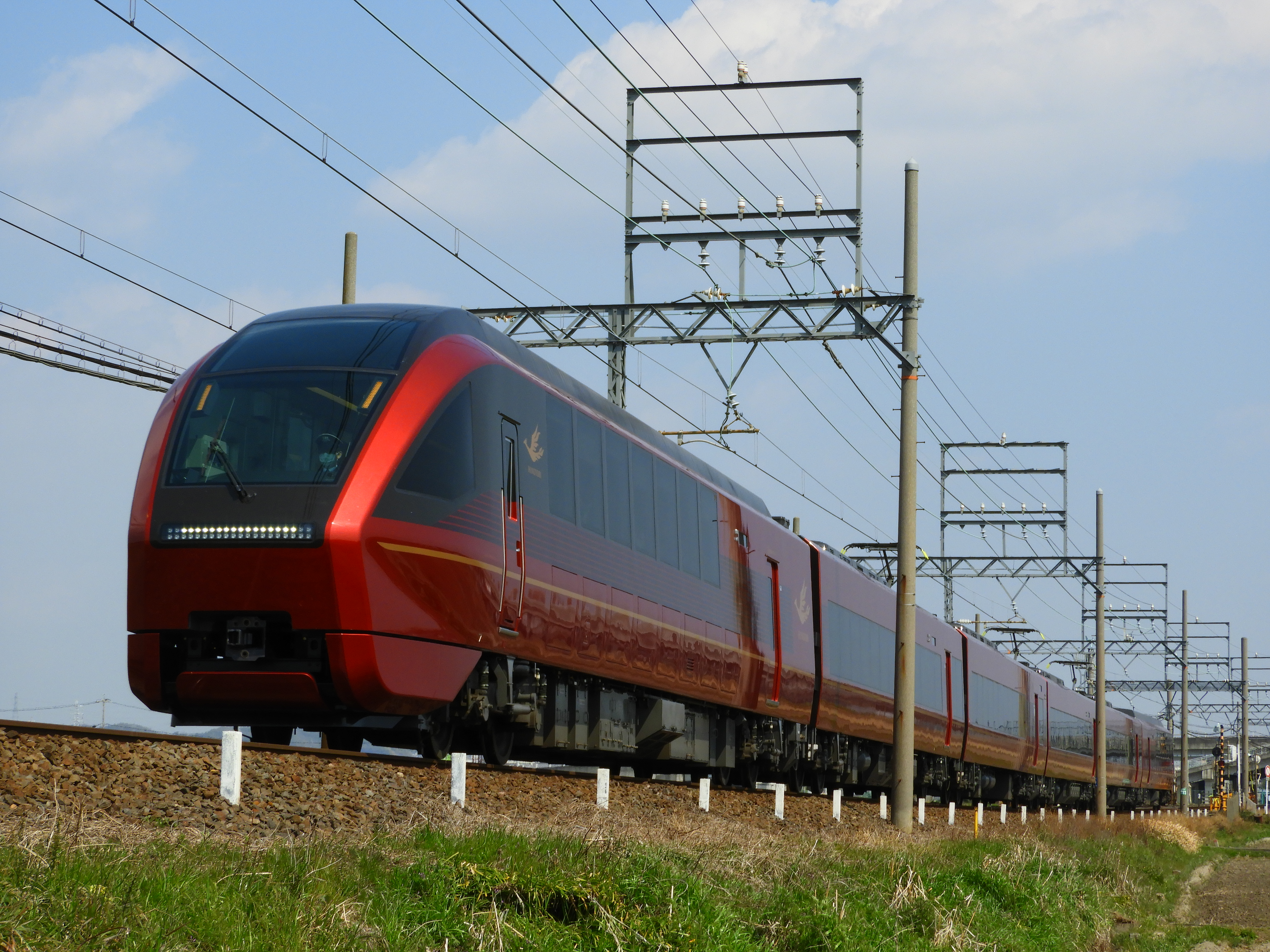
- Kintetsu 80000 series Hinotori limited express service on the line

Overview
- Native name: 名古屋線
- Status: In service
- Owner: Kintetsu Railway Co., Ltd.
- Line number: E
- Locale: Aichi Prefecture; Mie Prefecture
- Termini: Kintetsu-Nagoya; Ise-Nakagawa
- Stations: 44
- Color on map: (#1b3db0)

Service
- Type: Heavy rail; Commuter rail
- System: Kintetsu Railway
- Operator(s): Kintetsu Railway Co., Ltd.

History
- Opened: 10 September 1915; 110 years ago
- Last extension: 26 June 1938; 87 years ago

Technical
- Line length: 78.8 km (49.0 mi)
- Number of tracks: Double-track
- Track gauge: 1,435 mm (4 ft 8 1/2 in) standard gauge
- Old gauge: 1,067 mm (3 ft 6 in) (until 1959)
- Electrification: 1,500 V DC (overhead line)
- Operating speed: 120 km/h (75 mph)
- Signalling: Automatic closed block
- Train protection system: Kintetsu ATS, ATS-SP

The Nagoya Line (名古屋線, Nagoya-sen) is a railway line owned and operated by the Kintetsu Railway, a Japanese private railway company, connecting Nagoya and Ise Nakagawa Station in Matsusaka, Mie Prefecture via Kuwana, Yokkaichi, Suzuka, Tsu municipalities along the Ise Bay. The official starting-point of the line is Ise-Nakagawa and the terminus is Nagoya; however, operationally trains run "down" from and "up" towards Nagoya.

The line approximately parallels the Central Japan Railway Company (JR Central) Kansai Main Line, the Ise Railway Ise Line, and the JR Central Kisei Main Line, and all three offer rapid services from Nagoya to Ise.

== History ==
The first section of the line between Takadahonzan and Shiroko was opened by the Ise Electric Railway on 10 September 1915. The line at this period operated with steam locomotives. This section was extended from Shiroko to Chiyozaki on 9 January 1916, and to Kusu on 22 December 1917. The original line also extended south, reaching Tsu on 1 January 1917. The line continued its extension, connecting Kuwana, Tsu, and Daijingumae (located near the Ise Shrine, since closed) by 25 December 1930. Ōsaka Electric Tram's subsidiary Sankyu Rapid Electric Railway opened a branch of their own line on 18 May 1930, which extended from the current Ise-Nakagawa to Hisai. The Ise Electric Railway entered an economic crisis around this time, and was merged into the Sankyu Rapid Electric Railway on 15 September 1936. The branch line was extended from Hisai to Tsu on 20 June 1938. Kansai Rapid Electric Railway, also a subsidiary of the Ōsaka Electric Tram, opened the section from Kuwana to Kintetsu Nagoya on 26 June 1938. On the same date, Edobashi and Tsu were connected by the Sankyu Rapid Electric Railway, completing the Nagoya Line. The Edobashi Station became the border for the narrow-gauge section north of Edobashi and the standard-gauge section south of Edobashi. This border was later moved to Ise-Nakagawa, when the section between Ise-Nakagawa and Edobashi was narrowed to narrow-gauge in December of the same year. With the merger of the Ōsaka Electric Tram and the Sankyu Rapid Electric Railway into the Kansai Rapid Railway in March 1941, and their incorporation into the Kintetsu Railway on 1 June 1944, the line came under Kintetsu ownership. Kintetsu began running a paid limited express service from Ōsaka Uehommachi to Kintetsu Nagoya in 1947, but required a transfer at Ise-Nakagawa due to gauge differences.

For a brief period, the Nagoya Line was connected with the Meitetsu Nagoya Main Line. The Kintetsu Nagoya Station was linked with the adjacent Meitetsu Nagoya Station from August 1950 to September 1952. Using this connection, reserved group trains from Kintetsu were able to reach Toyokawa Station near Toyokawa Inari via the Meitetsu Nagoya Main Line and the JNR-operated Iida Line. Meitetsu trains, on the other hand were able to reach Kuwana and Ise-Nakagawa. This link was disconnected due to changes in the layout of the Meitetsu Nagoya Station, and the construction of the Meitetsu Department Store.

The line before 1956 had many sharp curves in the city of Yokkaichi, as the route connected the Yokkaichi Station in the outskirts operated by the Japanese National Railways (JNR), and the Suwa Station located in the middle of the city. However, the curves affected the max speed of the services on the line, such as the limited express service, and Kintetsu found little benefit in connecting the station to JNR's Kansai Main Line, which had far less passengers compared to the Nagoya Line. The rerouting works to straighten the line were completed in September 1956, and the Suwa station, now named Kintetsu Yokkaichi Station, was relocated to the new route. While the former Ise Electric Railway's route south beyond Edobashi were still in service around this period under Kintetsu ownership, this redundant route was closed in 1961. Kintetsu also planned to change the track gauge of the narrow-gauge line to standard gauge from September 1958, in order to allow through service from Nagoya to Osaka. The Nagoya Line was hit by the Ise-wan Typhoon in 1959, which severely damaged the infrastructure of the line. As a result, the reconstruction works also took place along with the gauge changes. The line resumed operation with the new gauge 62 days after the typhoon damaged the line. Through service from Ōsaka Uehommachi and Ujiyamada to Kintetsu Nagoya commenced on 12 December 1959. The line's limited express service held 69.4% of the shares for rail transport between Nagoya and Osaka around this time, but the share fell to 19% in 1966 following the operation of the Tokaido Shinkansen in 1964. The line recovered after JNR's constant raising of fares from 1976. Limited express trains on the line began running at the maximum speed of 120 km/h (75 mph) in 1988 following the introduction of the Urban Liner service and the Kintetsu 21000 series. Hinotori services commenced along with the introduction of the Kintetsu 80000 series in 2020.

== Network and operations ==
=== Stations ===
No.	Station		Distance (km)	Transfers	Location	
E01	Kintetsu-Nagoya	近鉄名古屋	0.0	Tōkaidō Shinkansen; Tōkaidō Main Line; Chūō Main Line; Kansai Main Line; Meitetsu Nagoya Main Line; Higashiyama Line; Sakura-dōri Line; Aonami Line	Nakamura-ku, Nagoya	Aichi Prefecture
E02	Komeno	米野	1.1		Nakamura-ku, Nagoya	Aichi Prefecture
E03	Kogane	黄金	2.1		Nakamura-ku, Nagoya	Aichi Prefecture
E04	Kasumori	烏森	2.8		Nakamura-ku, Nagoya	Aichi Prefecture
E05	Kintetsu-Hatta	近鉄八田	3.8	Kansai Main Line; Higashiyama Line	Nakamura-ku, Nagoya	Aichi Prefecture
E06	Fushiya	伏屋	6.4		Nakagawa-ku, Nagoya	Aichi Prefecture
E07	Toda	戸田	8.4		Nakagawa-ku, Nagoya	Aichi Prefecture
E08	Kintetsu-Kanie	近鉄蟹江	9.7		Kanie	Aichi Prefecture
E09	Tomiyoshi	富吉	12.1		Kanie	Aichi Prefecture
E10	Sakogi	佐古木	13.7		Yatomi	Aichi Prefecture
E11	Kintetsu-Yatomi	近鉄弥富	16.1	Kansai Main Line; Meitetsu Bisai Line	Yatomi	Aichi Prefecture
E12	Kintetsu-Nagashima	近鉄長島	19.5		Kuwana	Mie Prefecture
E13	Kuwana	桑名	23.7	Kansai Main Line; Yōrō Railway Yōrō Line; Sangi Railway Hokusei Line	Kuwana	Mie Prefecture
E14	Masuo	益生	24.8		Kuwana	Mie Prefecture
E15	Ise-Asahi	伊勢朝日	27.4		Asahi	Mie Prefecture
E16	Kawagoe Tomisuhara	川越富洲原	30.0		Kawagoe	Mie Prefecture
E17	Kintetsu-Tomida	近鉄富田	31.6	Sangi Railway Sangi Line	Yokkaichi	Mie Prefecture
E18	Kasumigaura	霞ヶ浦	33.5		Yokkaichi	Mie Prefecture
E19	Akuragawa	阿倉川	34.6		Yokkaichi	Mie Prefecture
E20	Kawaramachi	川原町	35.7		Yokkaichi	Mie Prefecture
E21	Kintetsu-Yokkaichi	近鉄四日市	36.9	K Yunoyama Line; Yokkaichi Asunarou Railway Utsube Line; Yokkaichi Asunarou Railway Hachiōji Line	Yokkaichi	Mie Prefecture
E22	Shinshō	新正	38.1		Yokkaichi	Mie Prefecture
E23	Miyamado	海山道	39.6		Yokkaichi	Mie Prefecture
E24	Shiohama	塩浜	40.8		Yokkaichi	Mie Prefecture
E25	Kita-Kusu	北楠	42.6		Yokkaichi	Mie Prefecture
E26	Kusu	楠	44.2		Yokkaichi	Mie Prefecture
E27	Nagonoura	長太ノ浦	45.6		Suzuka	Mie Prefecture
E28	Mida	箕田	47.0		Suzuka	Mie Prefecture
E29	Ise-Wakamatsu	伊勢若松	48.3	L Suzuka Line	Suzuka	Mie Prefecture
E30	Chiyozaki	千代崎	50.1		Suzuka	Mie Prefecture
E31	Shiroko	白子	52.9		Suzuka	Mie Prefecture
E32	Tsuzumigaura	鼓ヶ浦	54.1		Suzuka	Mie Prefecture
E33	Isoyama	磯山	56.0		Suzuka	Mie Prefecture
E34	Chisato	千里	57.9		Tsu	Mie Prefecture
E35	Toyotsu-Ueno	豊津上野	59.8		Tsu	Mie Prefecture
E36	Shiratsuka	白塚	61.7		Tsu	Mie Prefecture
E37	Takadahonzan	高田本山	64.1		Tsu	Mie Prefecture
E38	Edobashi	江戸橋	65.3		Tsu	Mie Prefecture
E39	Tsu	津	66.5	Kisei Main Line; Ise Railway Ise Line	Tsu	Mie Prefecture
E40	Tsu-shimmachi	津新町	68.8		Tsu	Mie Prefecture
E41	Minamigaoka	南が丘	71.5		Tsu	Mie Prefecture
E42	Hisai	久居	74.0		Tsu	Mie Prefecture
E43	Momozono	桃園	75.5		Tsu	Mie Prefecture
E61	Ise-Nakagawa	伊勢中川	78.8	D Osaka Line; M Yamada Line	Matsusaka	Mie Prefecture

=== Services ===
Kintetsu has a separate timetable for weekdays and weekends/holidays. As of September 2023, four types of services operate in the line. From the service with the most stops to the least stops made, those are local, semi-express, express, and limited express. Local trains stop at all stations, and the semi-express service skips six stations after departing Kintetsu Nagoya, stopping at all other stations and terminating at Kintetsu Yokkaichi. A reverse trip with the same stops are also provided. Some express services provide through service via the Kintetsu Yamada Line, Kintetsu Toba Line, and the Kintetsu Suzuka Line. Several different limited express services run through the line, such as Hinotori, Shimakaze, and Urban Liner.

Legend
●	Trains stop here
○	Trains stop here sometimes
|	Trains do not stop here

No.	Station	Local	Semi-Exp.	Exp.	Limited Exp. (Toba)	Limited Exp. (Osaka)	Shimakaze
E01	Kintetsu-Nagoya	●	●	●	●	●	●
E02	Komeno	●	|	|	|	|	|
E03	Kogane	●	|	|	|	|	|
E04	Kasumori	●	|	|	|	|	|
E05	Kintetsu-Hatta	●	|	|	|	|	|
E06	Fushiya	●	|	|	|	|	|
E07	Toda	●	|	|	|	|	|
E08	Kintetsu-Kanie	●	●	●	|	|	|
E09	Tomiyoshi	●	●	|	|	|	|
E10	Sakogi	●	●	|	|	|	|
E11	Kintetsu-Yatomi	●	●	●	|	|	|
E12	Kintetsu-Nagashima	●	●	|	|	|	|
E13	Kuwana	●	●	●	●	|	|
E14	Masuo	●	●	|	|	|	|
E15	Ise-Asahi	●	●	|	|	|	|
E16	Kawagoe Tomisuhara	●	●	|	|	|	|
E17	Kintetsu-Tomida	●	●	●	|	|	|
E18	Kasumigaura	●	●	|	|	|	|
E19	Akuragawa	●	●	|	|	|	|
E20	Kawaramachi	●	●	|	|	|	|
E21	Kintetsu-Yokkaichi	●	●	●	●	|	●
E22	Shinshō	●		|	|	|	|
E23	Miyamado	●		|	|	|	|
E24	Shiohama	●		●	|	|	|
E25	Kita-Kusu	●		|	|	|	|
E26	Kusu	●		|	|	|	|
E27	Nagonoura	●		|	|	|	|
E28	Mida	●		|	|	|	|
E29	Ise-Wakamatsu	●		●	|	|	|
E30	Chiyozaki	●		|	|	|	|
E31	Shiroko	●		●	●	|	|
E32	Tsuzumigaura	●		|	|	|	|
E33	Isoyama	●		|	|	|	|
E34	Chisato	●		|	|	|	|
E35	Toyotsu-Ueno	●		|	|	|	|
E36	Shiratsuka	●		|	|	|	|
E37	Takadahonzan	●		|	|	|	|
E38	Edobashi	●		●	|	|	|
E39	Tsu	●		●	●	●	|
E40	Tsu-shimmachi	●		●	|	|	|
E41	Minamigaoka	●		●	|	|	|
E42	Hisai	●		●	○	|	|
E43	Momozono	●		●	|	|	|
E61	Ise-Nakagawa	●		●	●	|	|
↓Kintetsu Yamada line↓
