= 2 ft 6 in gauge railways in Japan =

A list of 2 ft 6 in gauge railways in Japan.

== Railways ==
=== In operation at 762 mm (2 ft 6 in) ===
- Sangi Railway Hokusei Line
- Yokkaichi Asunarou Railway Hachiōji Line
- Yokkaichi Asunarou Railway Utsube Line
- Kurobe Gorge Railway
- Kurobe Senyō Railway (industrial)
- Anbō Forest Railway [jp] (industrial)
- Historical Village of Hokkaido horse-drawn tram
- DisneySea Electric Railway (located in Tokyo DisneySea)
- Western River Railroad (located in Tokyo Disneyland) (separate 914 mm (3 ft) gauge railway named Jolly Trolley previously present)

=== Defunct or converted ===
- Hidaka Takushoku Railway (converted to 1,067 mm (3 ft 6 in) gauge) (operating)
- Jōshin Dentetsu Jōshin Line (converted to 1,067 mm (3 ft 6 in) gauge) (operating)
- Kabe Line (converted to 1,067 mm (3 ft 6 in) gauge) (operating)
- Kintetsu Yunoyama Line (converted to 1,435 mm (4 ft 8 1/2 in) gauge) (operating)
- Kiso Forest Railway (defunct)
- Kurama-dera Cable (converted to 800 mm (2 ft 7 1/2 in) gauge) (operating)
- Kurihara Den'en Railway Line (converted to 1,067 mm (3 ft 6 in) gauge) (defunct)
- Kururi Line (converted to 1,067 mm (3 ft 6 in) gauge) (operating)
- Nagareyama Line (converted to 1,067 mm (3 ft 6 in) gauge) (operating)
- Ōigawa Railway Ikawa Line (dual gauge lines with 1,067 mm (3 ft 6 in) gauge track previously present) (converted to 1,067 mm (3 ft 6 in) gauge) (operating)
- Okinawa Prefectural Railways (converted to 1,067 mm (3 ft 6 in) gauge) (defunct)
- Ryūgasaki Line (converted to 1,067 mm (3 ft 6 in) gauge) (operating)
- Sakagawa Line (defunct)
- Tobu Kinugawa Line (converted to 1,067 mm (3 ft 6 in) gauge) (operating)
- Tōbu Yaita Line (converted to 1,067 mm (3 ft 6 in) gauge) (defunct)
- Tomakomai Light Railway (converted to 1,067 mm (3 ft 6 in) gauge) (operating)
- Uchiko Line (converted to 1,067 mm (3 ft 6 in) gauge) (operating)

=== Influence in former colonies ===
Taiwan:

- Alishan Forest Railway
- Taiwan Sugar Railways
- TRA Taitung line before 1982

== Gallery ==
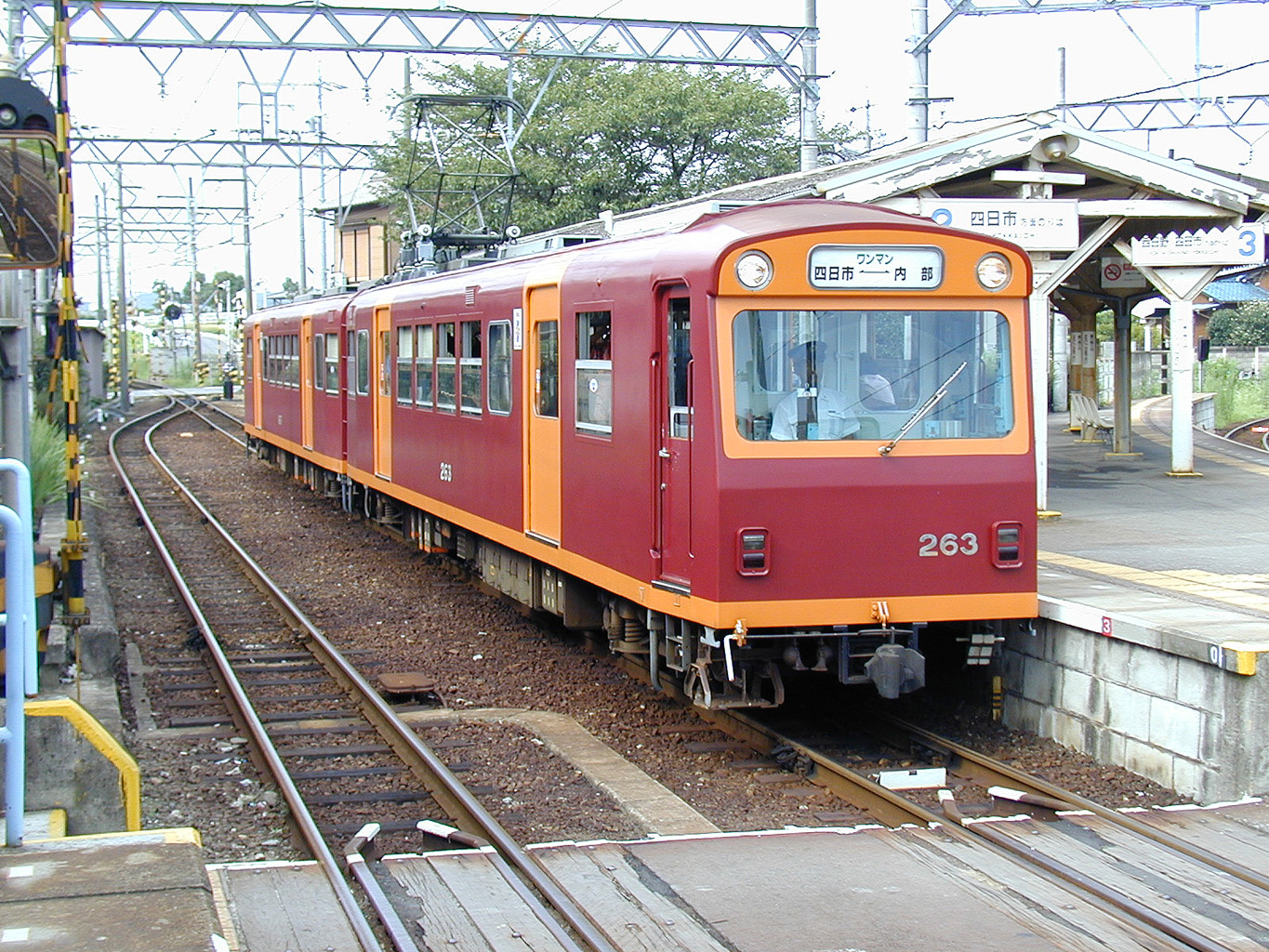
260 series train at Hinaga Station

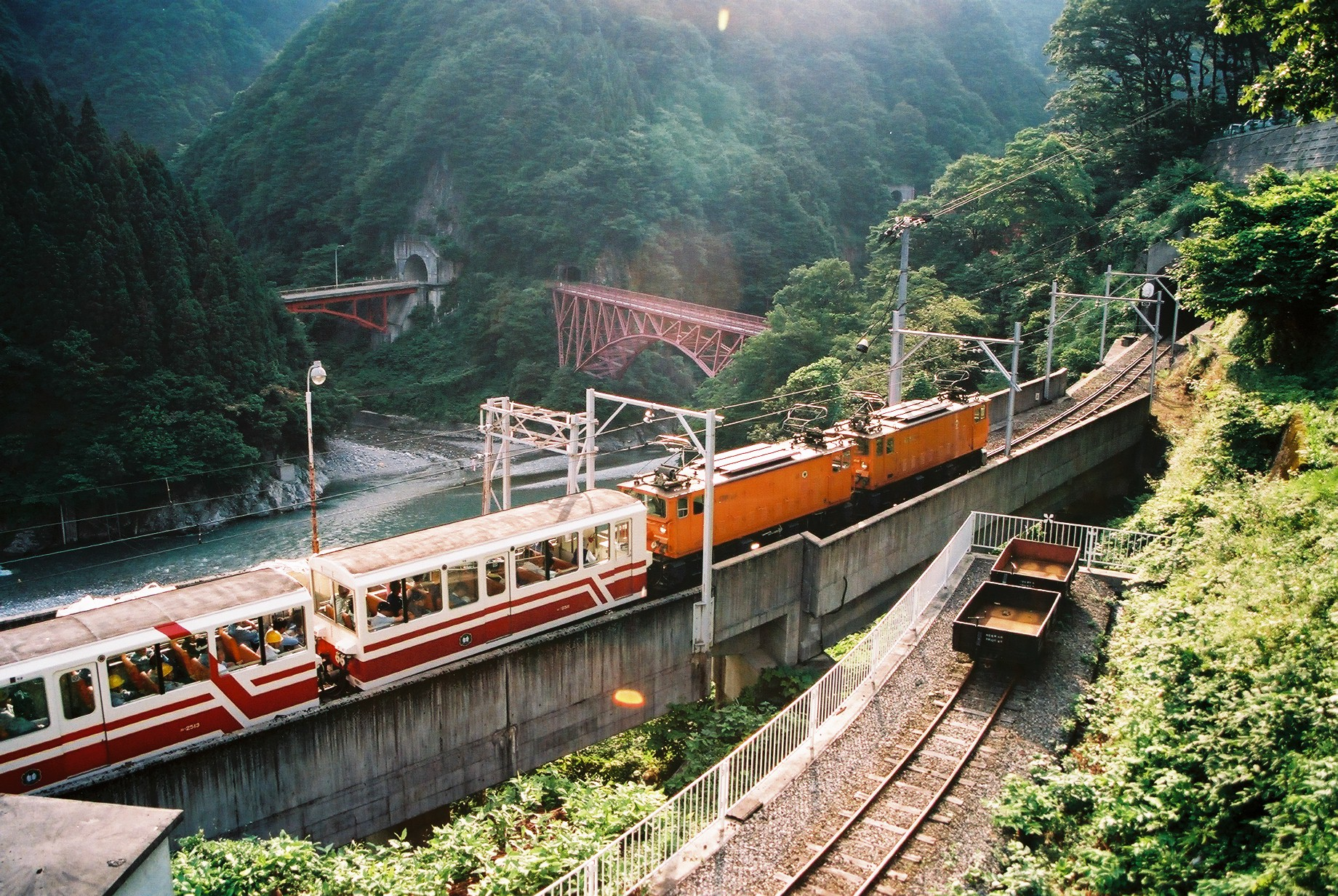
Kurobe Gorge Railway

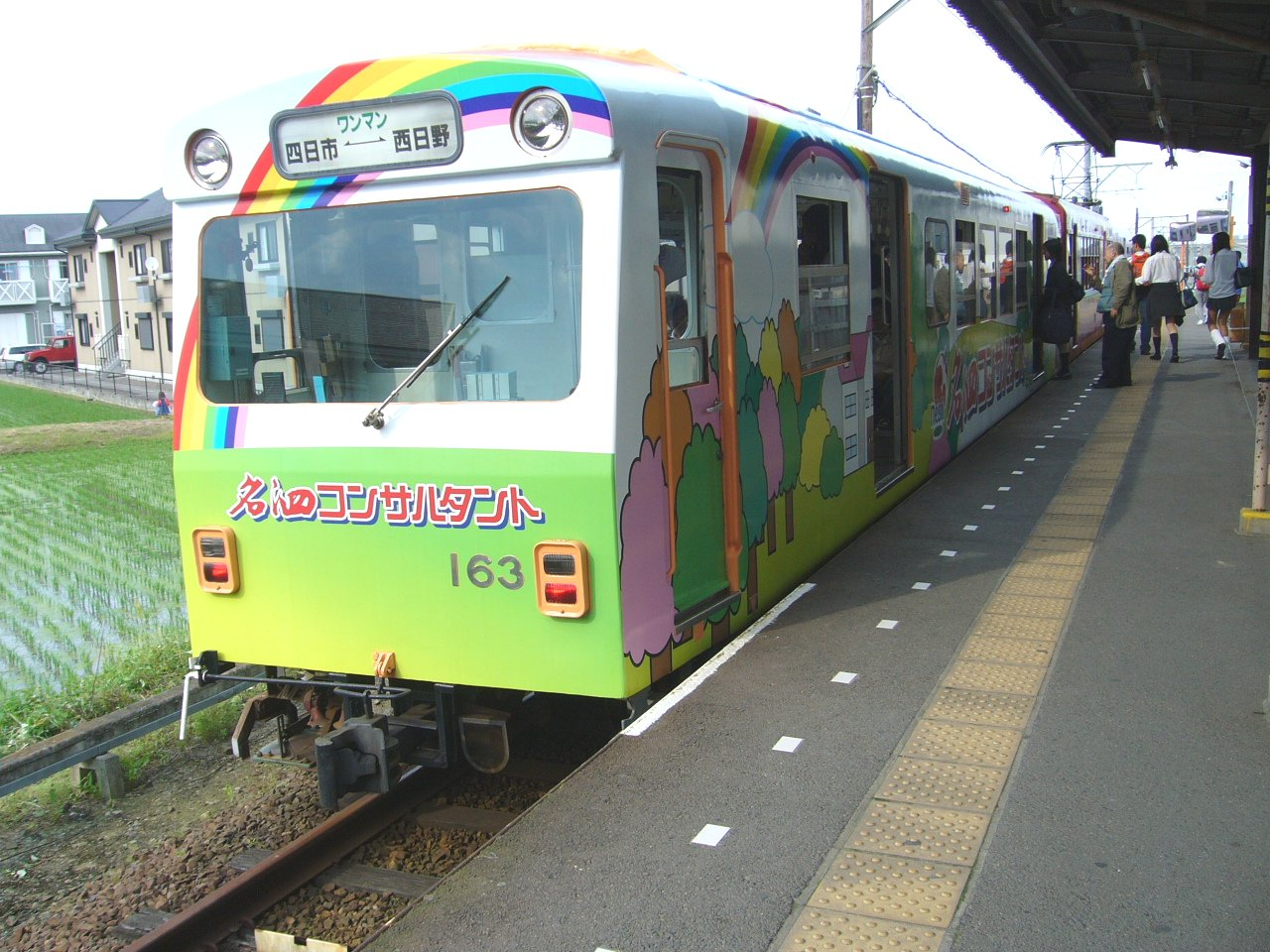
Nishihino Station on the Yokkaichi Asunarou Railway Hachiōji Line

== See also ==
- Heritage railway
- List of track gauges
