= Suzuka Line =

Railway line in Japan

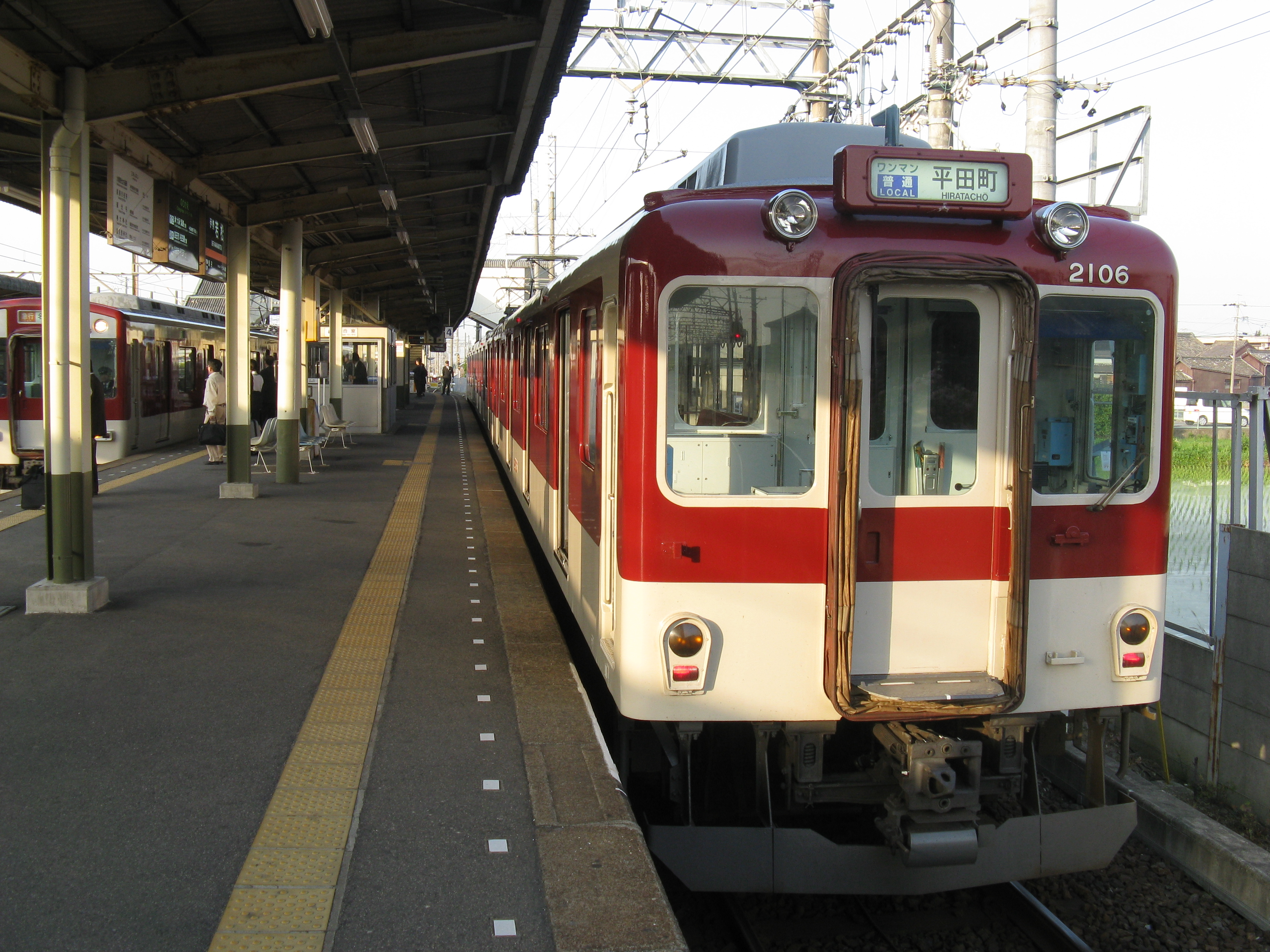
- Local bound for Hiratachō

Overview
- Owner: Kintetsu Railway
- Line number: L
- Locale: Suzuka City, Mie Prefecture
- Termini: Ise-Wakamatsu; Hiratachō
- Stations: 5
- Color on map: (#1B3DB0)

Service
- Type: Regional rail Commuter Rail
- System: Kintetsu Railway
- Operator(s): Kintetsu Railway
- Rolling stock: 1010 series EMU; 2000 series EMU; 2444 series EMU

History
- Opened: 20 December 1925; 100 years ago
- Last extension: 8 April 1963; 62 years ago

Technical
- Line length: 8.2 km (5.1 mi)
- Number of tracks: Single-track
- Track gauge: 1,435 mm (4 ft 8 1/2 in) standard gauge
- Electrification: 1,500 V DC (overhead line)
- Operating speed: 80 km/h (50 mph)
- Signalling: Automatic closed block
- Train protection system: Kintetsu ATS

The Suzuka Line (鈴鹿線, Kintetsu Suzuka-sen) is a railway line of the Japanese private railway company Kintetsu Railway, connecting Ise-Wakamatsu Station (Suzuka, Mie) and Hiratachō Station (Suzuka, Mie Prefecture) in Japan.

The line connects with the Nagoya Line at Ise-Wakamatsu Station.

Students and factory workers make up the majority of the line's ridership and trains are generally only crowded during rush hour.

== History ==
=== Kambe Line ===
The Suzuka Line was originally built by Ise Electric Railway (Iseden) in the 1920s and was known as the Iseden Kambe Line (伊勢電神戸線, Iseden Kambe-sen)) and for many years the track ended at Ise-Kambe Station (what is now Suzukashi Station). Steam locomotives were used on the line for its first two years of operation but were soon replaced when the line was electrified in 1927. Though the line was built by Iseden, ownership of the Kambe Line was passed between various railway companies during the late 1930s and early 1940s due to many mergers occurring within the Japanese private railway industry at that time. It came under the ownership of Kintetsu in 1944.

Kintetsu made some improvements to the line in the late 1950s and 1960s. The track gauge on the line, originally 1,067 mm (3 ft 6 in) was widened to 1,435 mm (4 ft 8 1/2 in) so that it could connect directly with the Nagoya Line, also widened to 1,435 mm at that time. A few years later, the line was extended, two new stations were built, and Hiratachō Station became the new terminus. It was at this time that the line received its current name.

=== Timeline ===
- December 20, 1925 - Ise Railway (Iseden) opens the line as the Iseden Kambe Line (Ise-Wakamatsu ~ Ise-Kambe).
- December 26, 1927 - Electrification of the entire line completed.
- September 15, 1936 - Sangū Express Electric Railway (Sankyū) acquires Iseden and all of its lines. Line is officially renamed Ise Kambe Line.
- March 15, 1941 - Osaka Electric Railroad (Daiki) and Sankyū merge to form Kansai Express Railway (Kankyū). Line officially renamed Kambe Line.
- June 1, 1944 - Kankyū changes its name to Kinki Nippon Railway (Kintetsu). Line officially renamed Kintetsu Kambe Line.
- November 23, 1959 - Gauge along entire line widened from 1067 mm to 1435 mm.
- April 8, 1963 - Ise-Kambe ~ Hiratachō extension opens. Ise-Kambe Station officially renamed Suzukashi Station. Line officially renamed Kintetsu Suzuka Line.
- October 17, 1968 - ATS system activated on entire line.
- March 16, 1995 - Maximum speed on the line raised from 65 to 80 km/h (40 to 50 mph); total ride time from end-to-end reduced by one minute.
- June 13, 1998 - One man (conductor-less) train service begins.

== Service ==
LO Local (普通; futsū)

For Wakamatsu
For Hiratachō
(Locals stop at every station.)
(Trains run twice per hour during the day, four times per hour in the mornings and evenings.)

EX Express (急行; kyūkō)

For Yokkaichi
For Hiratachō
(Stops at every station on the Suzuka Line.)
(Trains run once a day in the morning on weekdays.)

== Stations ==
Legend
●	Trains stop here

No.	Station		Dist (km)	Connections	LO	EX	Location	
L29	Ise-Wakamatsu	伊勢若松	0.0	E Nagoya Line	●	●	Suzuka	Mie; Prefecture
L30	Yanagi	柳	2.2		●	●	Suzuka	Mie; Prefecture
L31	Suzukashi	鈴鹿市	4.1		●	●	Suzuka	Mie; Prefecture
L32	Mikkaichi	三日市	6.2		●	●	Suzuka	Mie; Prefecture
L33	Hiratachō	平田町	8.2		●	●	Suzuka	Mie; Prefecture
