= Akahori Station =

Railway station in Yokkaichi, Mie Prefecture, Japan

Akahori Station 赤堀駅
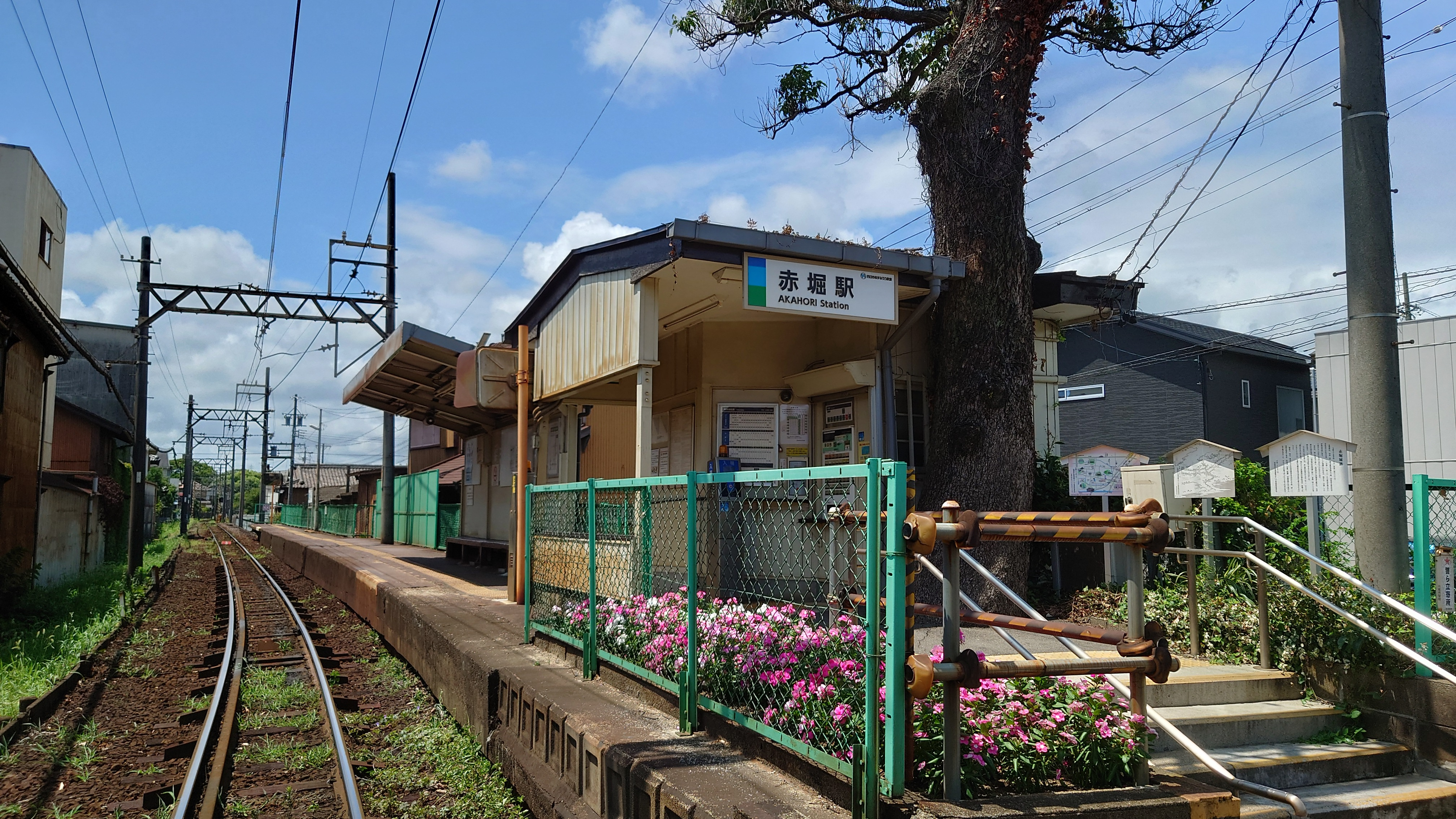
- Akahori Station in August 2023

General information
- Location: Akahori 2-13-20, Yokkaichi, Mie （三重県四日市市赤堀二丁目13-20） Japan
- Coordinates: 34°57′34.13″N 136°36′38.67″E
- Operator: Yokkaichi Asunarou Railway
- Lines: Utsube Line; Hachiōji Line

History
- Opened: October 10, 1912,

Passengers
- FY2011: 321 daily
Location

Akahori Station (赤堀駅, Akahori-eki) is a railway station on the Yokkaichi Asunarou Railway Utsube Line in Yokkaichi, Mie Prefecture, Japan, operated by the private railway operator Yokkaichi Asunarou Railway. It is 1.0 rail kilometers from the terminus of the Utsube Line at Asunarou Yokkaichi Station.

== Lines ==
- Yokkaichi Asunarou Railway
  - Utsube Line

== Layout ==
Akahori Station has a single side platform serving bi-directional traffic. The station is unattended.

=== Platforms ===
■ Yokkaichi Asunarou Railway Utsube Line	for Utsube and Nishihino for Yokkaichi

== Adjacent stations ==
«	Service	»
Utsube Line
Asunarou Yokkaichi	Local	Hinaga

== History ==
Akahori Station was opened on October 10, 1912, as a station on the Mie Tramway Line, which became the Mie Railway in 1916. On February 11, 1944, due to mergers, the station came under the ownership of Sanco. In November 1944, the station was rebuilt 100 meters closer towards present-day Asunarou Yokkaichi Station. On February 1, 1964, the Railway division of Sanco split off and formed a separate company, the Mie Electric Railway, which merged with Kintetsu on April 1, 1965.

The line has been operated by the Yokkaichi Asunarou Railway since April 1, 2015.
