= Minami-Hinaga Station =

Railway station in Yokkaichi, Mie Prefecture, Japan

Coordinates: 34.9500°N 136.6009°E

Minami-Hinaga Station 南日永駅
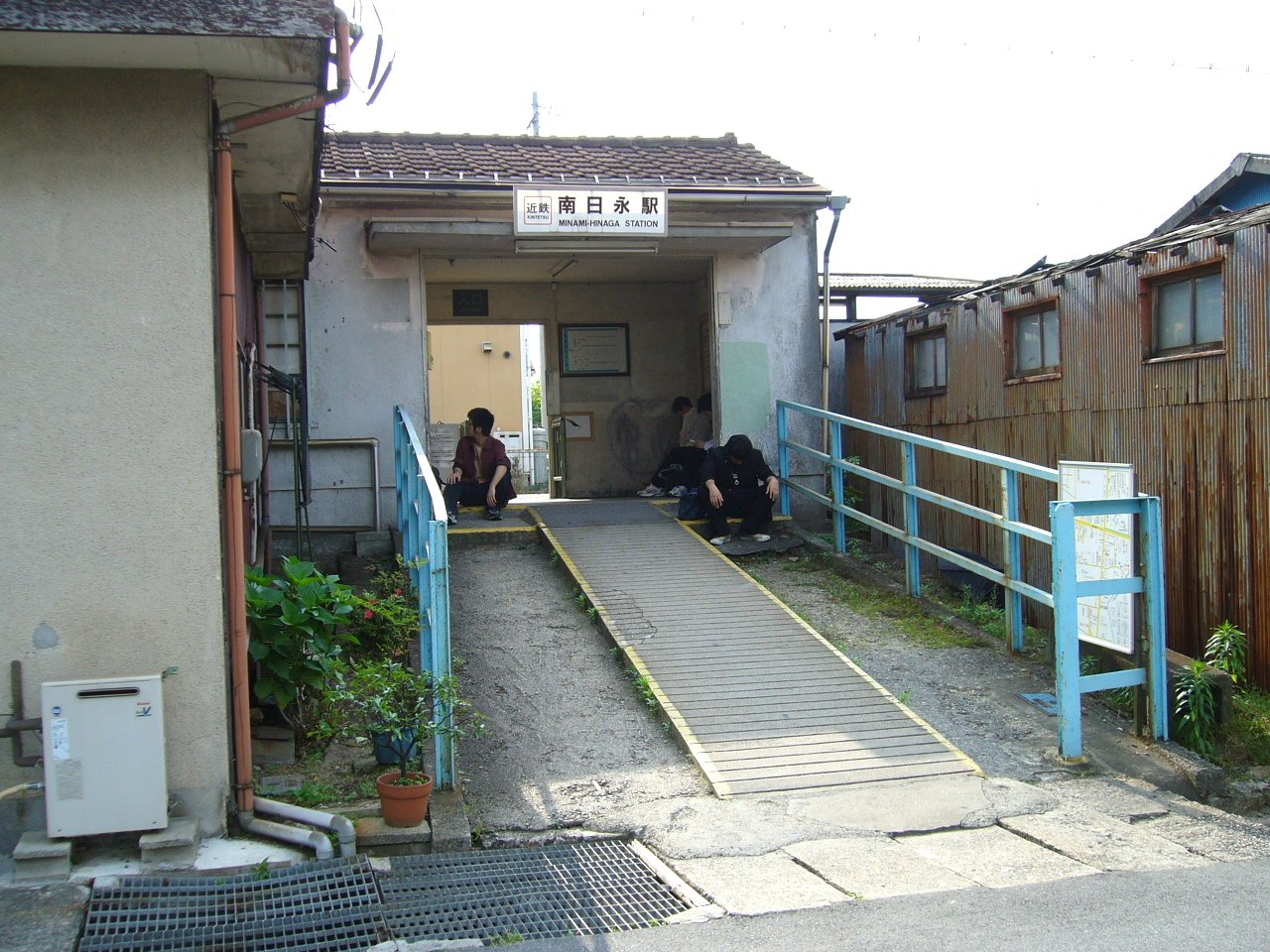
- Minami-Hinaga Station

General information
- Location: Hinaga 4-5-48, Yokkaichi, Mie （三重県四日市市日永四丁目5-48） Japan
- Operator: Kintetsu
- Line: Kintetsu Utsube Line

History
- Opened: June 21, 1922

Passengers
- FY2011: 690 daily
Location

Minami-Hinaga Station (南日永駅, Minami-Hinaga-eki) is a railway station on the Kintetsu Utsube Line in Yokkaichi, Mie Prefecture, Japan, operated by the private railway operator Kintetsu. It is 2.5 rail kilometers from the terminus of the line at Kintetsu-Yokkaichi Station.

== Lines ==
- Kintetsu
  - Utsube Line

== Layout ==
Minami-Hinaga Station has a single side platform serving bi-directional traffic. The station is unattended.

=== Platforms ===
| 1 | ■ Kintetsu Utsube Line | For Kintetsu Yokkaichi; Utsube |

== Adjacent stations ==
| « | Service | » |
Kintetsu Utsube Line
| Hinaga | Local | Tomari |

== Surrounding area ==
- Yokkaichi Technical High School
- Kayo department store

== History ==
Minami-Hinaga Station was opened on June 21, 1922, as a station on the Mie Railway. On February 11, 1944, due to mergers, the station came under the ownership of Sanco. On February 1, 1964, the Railway division of Sanco split off and formed a separate company, the Mie Electric Railway, which merged with Kintetsu on April 1, 1965.
