= Oiwake Station (Mie) =

Railway station in Yokkaichi, Mie Prefecture, Japan

Coordinates: 34°56′03″N 136°35′46″E

Oiwake Station 追分駅
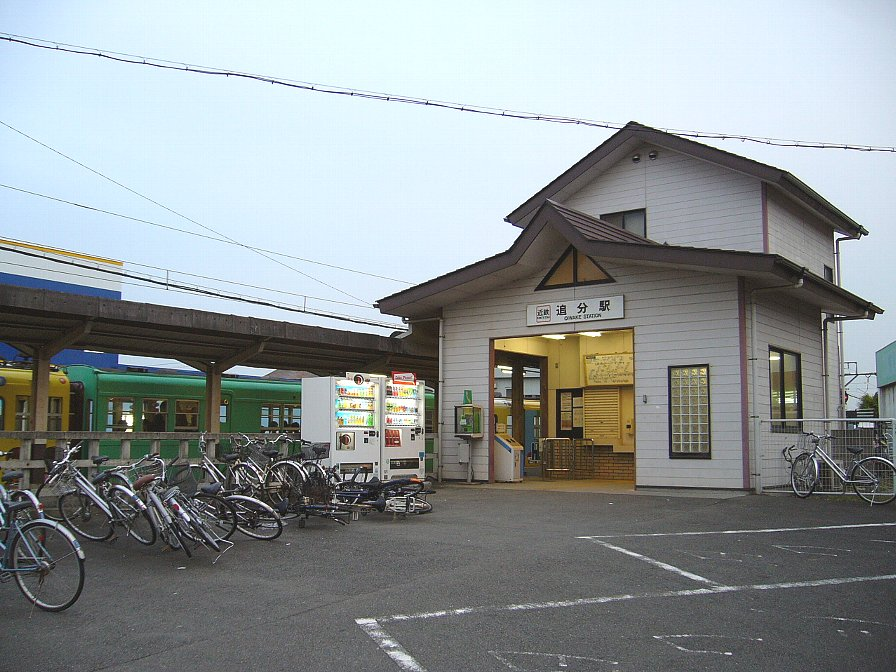
- Oiwake Station

General information
- Location: 3-19 Oiwake 3-chome, Yokkaichi, Mie （三重県四日市市追分三丁目3-19） Japan
- Operator: Kintetsu
- Line: Kintetsu Utsube Line

History
- Opened: June 21, 1922

Passengers
- FY2011: 622 daily
Location

Oiwake Station (追分駅, Oiwake-eki) is a railway station on the Kintetsu Utsube Line in Yokkaichi, Mie Prefecture, Japan, operated by the private railway operator Kintetsu. It is 4.3 rail kilometers from the terminus of the line at Kintetsu-Yokkaichi Station.

== Lines ==
- Kintetsu
  - Utsube Line

== Layout ==
Oiwake Station has a side platform serving bi-directional traffic. The station is unattended.

=== Platforms ===
1	■ Kintetsu Utsube Line	For Kintetsu Yokkaichi; For Utsube

== Adjacent stations ==
«	Service	»
Kintetsu Utsube Line
Tomari	Local	Ogoso

== Surrounding area ==
- Hinaga Fork: Ancient road fork between the Tōkaidō (to Kyoto) and the Sangūdō (to Ise Grand Shrine)
- Yokkaichi-Minami Junior High School
- Kaisei Junior and Senior High School

== History ==
Oiwake Station was opened on June 21, 1922 as a station on the Mie Railway. On February 11, 1944, due to mergers, the station came under the ownership of Sanco. On February 1, 1964 the Railway division of Sanco split off and formed a separate company, the Mie Electric Railway, which merged with Kintetsu on April 1, 1965.
