= Tomari Station (Mie) =

Railway station in Yokkaichi, Mie Prefecture, Japan

Coordinates: 34°56′25″N 136°35′54″E

Tomari Station 泊駅
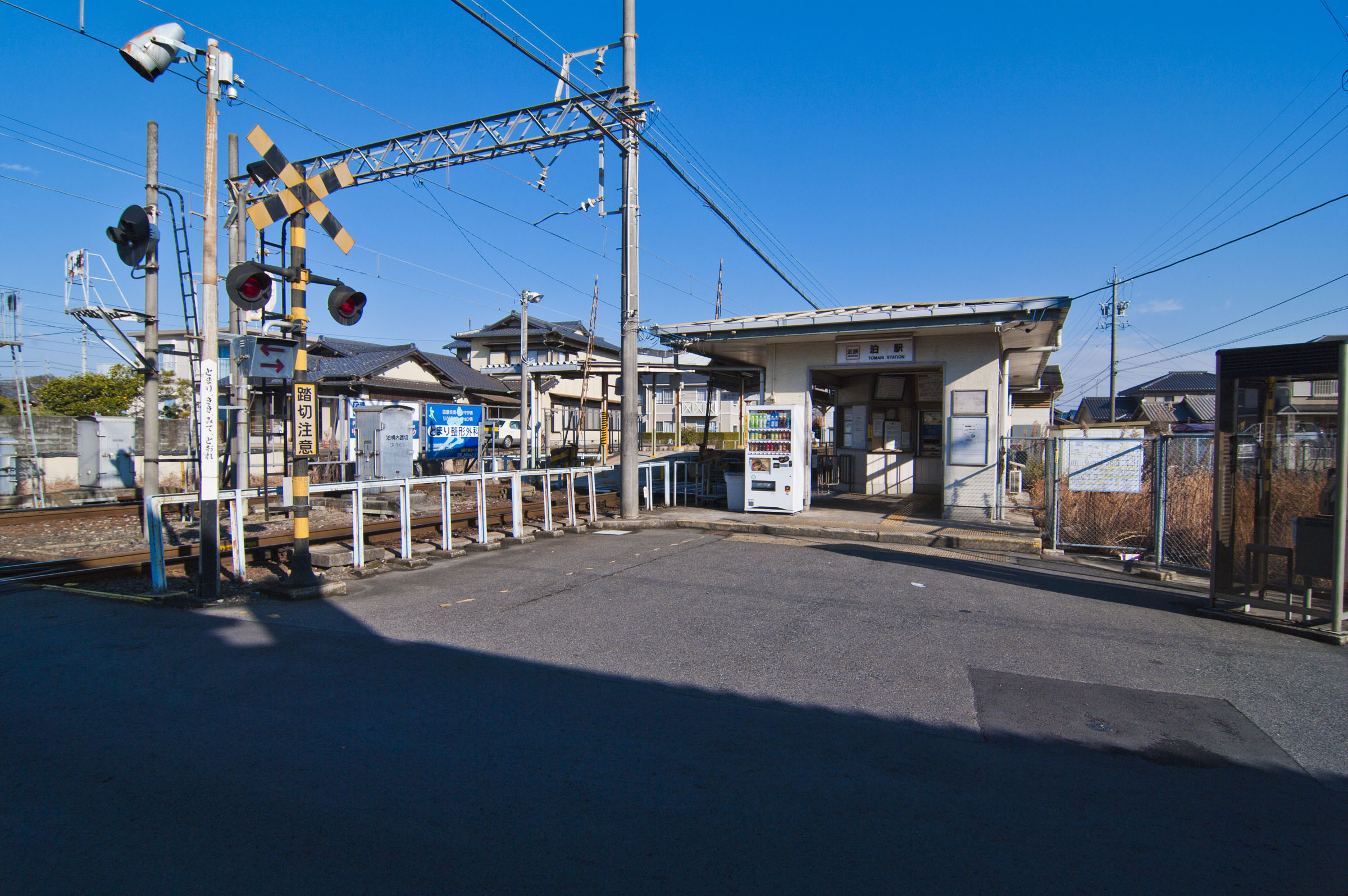
- Tomari Station

General information
- Location: Tomari-cho 3-20, Yokkaichi, Mie （三重県四日市市泊町3-20） Japan
- Operator: Kintetsu
- Line: Kintetsu Utsube Line

History
- Opened: June 21, 1922

Passengers
- FY2011: 479 daily
Location

Tomari Station (泊駅, Tomari-eki) is a railway station on the Kintetsu Utsube Line in Yokkaichi, Mie Prefecture, Japan, operated by the private railway operator Kintetsu. It is 3.6 rail kilometers from the terminus of the line at Kintetsu-Yokkaichi Station.

== Lines ==
- Kintetsu
  - Utsube Line

== Layout ==
Tomari Station has a single island platform. The station is unattended.

=== Platforms ===
1	■ Yokkaichi Asunarou Railway Utsube Line	For Yokkaichi
2	■ Yokkaichi Asunarou Railway Utsube Line	For Utsube

== Adjacent stations ==
«	Service	»
Kintetsu Utsube Line
Minami-Hinaga	Local	Oiwake

== Surrounding area ==
- Mie Medical Center
- ÆON Power City shopping center

== History ==
Tomari Station was opened on June 21, 1922 as a station on the Mie Railway. On February 11, 1944, due to mergers, the station came under the ownership of Sanco. On February 1, 1964 the Railway division of Sanco split off and formed a separate company, the Mie Electric Railway, which merged with Kintetsu on April 1, 1965.
