= Yokkaichi Asunarou Railway Utsube Line =

Railway line in Mie Prefecture, Japan

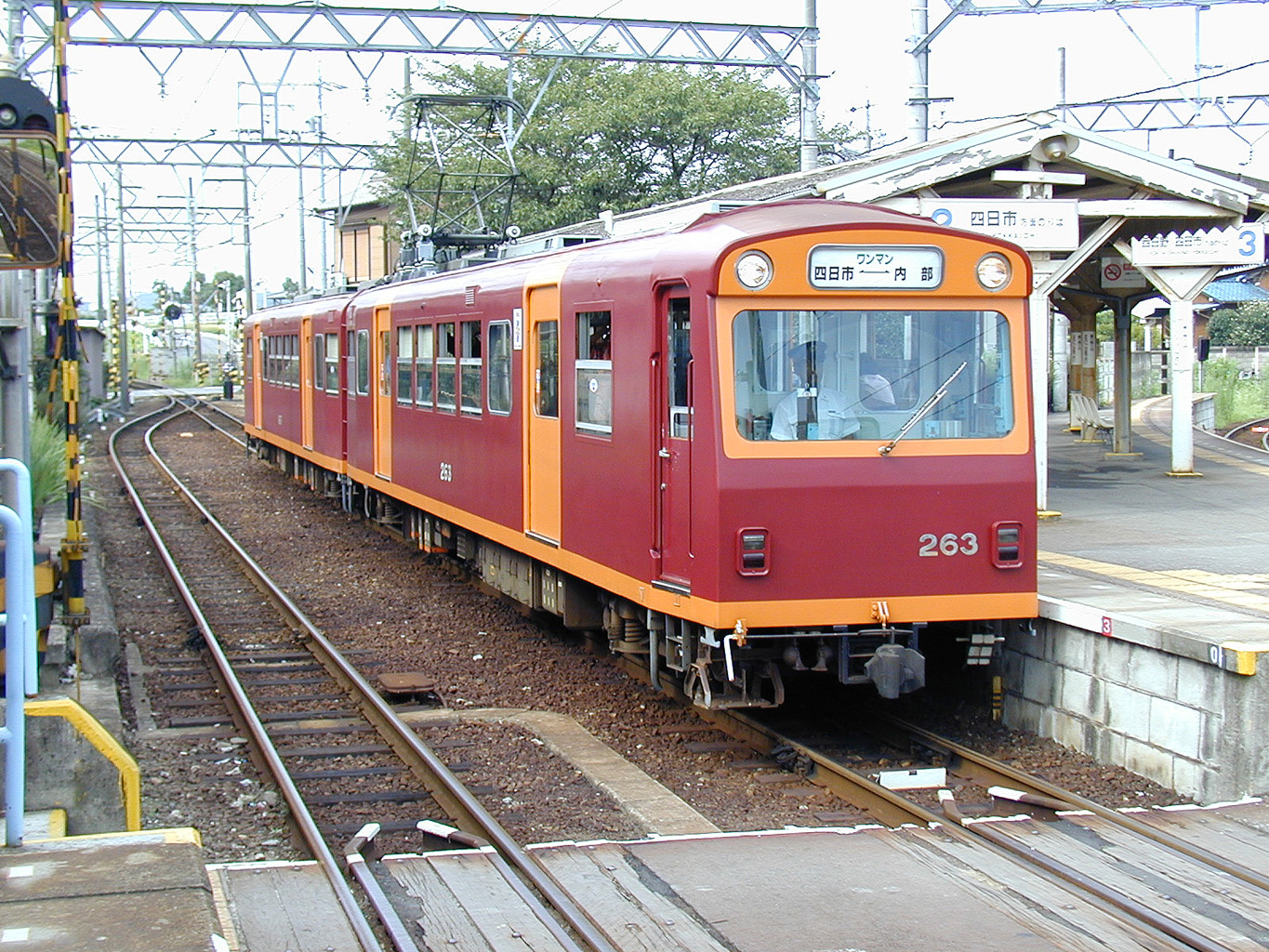
- 260 series train at Hinaga Station

Overview
- Locale: Mie Prefecture
- Termini: Asunarou Yokkaichi; Utsube
- Stations: 8

Service
- Type: Commuter rail
- Operator(s): Yokkaichi Asunarou Railway

History
- Opened: October 6, 1912; 113 years ago

Technical
- Line length: 5.7 km (3.5 mi)
- Number of tracks: 1
- Track gauge: 762 mm (2 ft 6 in)
- Electrification: 750 V DC, Overhead line

The Yokkaichi Asunarou Railway Utsube Line (四日市あすなろう鉄道内部線, Yokkaichi Asunarō Tetsudō Utsube-sen) is a 762 mm (2 ft 6 in) narrow gauge railway line operated by the Japanese private railway company Yokkaichi Asunarou Railway, connecting Asunarou Yokkaichi Station and Utsube Station, both in the city of Yokkaichi, Mie, Japan.

The line connects with the Kintetsu Nagoya Line and the Yunoyama Line at Asunarou Yokkaichi Station; these other lines use an elevated platform called Kintetsu Yokkaichi Station whereas the Utsube Line uses a low-level platform. At Hinaga Station, the line connects with the Yokkaichi Asunarou Railway Hachiōji Line, a one-station branch line. Because all trains on the Hachiōji Line offer direct service to Asunarou Yokkaichi via the Utsube Line, the two lines are collectively called the Utsube-Hachiōji Line (内部・八王子線, Utsube-Hachiōji-sen).

Until March 2015, the line was under control of Kintetsu, a major railway company.

== Narrow gauge railway ==
The line was originally built as a tram utilising a track gauge of 762mm, which was relatively common at that time for such local lines. Later on the legal classification of the line was changed from a tram to a light rail, however the gauge was not widened, unlike the majority of 762mm gauge lines. Today, there are only four 762 mm (2 ft 6 in) gauge railway lines in operation in Japan.

== Services ==
"Local" (普通, Futsū) services stop at every station.
All trains are wanman driver only operation.
Trains run four times per hour. In the down direction, each hour there are two bound for Utsube and two for Nishihino (via the Hachiōji Line)

== Stations ==
Station		Distance (km)	Transfers	Location	
Asunarou Yokkaichi	あすなろう四日市	0.0	Kintetsu Nagoya Line, Yunoyama Line	Yokkaichi	Mie Prefecture
Akahori	赤堀	1.0		Yokkaichi	Mie Prefecture
Hinaga	日永	1.8	Hachiōji Line	Yokkaichi	Mie Prefecture
Minami-Hinaga	南日永	2.5		Yokkaichi	Mie Prefecture
Tomari	泊	3.6		Yokkaichi	Mie Prefecture
Oiwake	追分	4.3		Yokkaichi	Mie Prefecture
Ogoso	小古曽	5.0		Yokkaichi	Mie Prefecture
Utsube	内部	5.7		Yokkaichi	Mie Prefecture

== History ==
Narrow gauge train interior

The Utsube Line was originally conceived and built by the Mie Tramway (三重軌道, Mie Kidō), later renamed Mie Railway (Santetsu). The original section of the line was completed in 1912 making it one of Kintetsu's oldest train lines. In 1916, an extension from Asunarou Yokkaichi (at that time called Suwa Station and located slightly to the east), to what is now JR Central Yokkaichi was opened. However, this extension was sold off in 1927 to Ise Electric Railway (Iseden) for use as part of their main line. This made Suwa Station, a hub between three different private railways and the biggest station in Yokkaichi, the terminus again. Steam locomotives ran on the line for many years until 1928 when gasoline-powered trains were introduced, which ran until the line was electrified in 1943.

The line originally included the Hachiōji Line and ended at Ise-Hachiōji Station. However an extension to Suzuka was planned to originate from Hinaga Station and construction began in 1922. However, this new section of the line was only completed as far as Utsube in Yokkaichi because legal permission to continue construction of the train line was revoked. The original section of the line, from Suwa to the end of never-to-be-finished Suzuka branch became the "Utsube Line", and the section of track which included the old terminus at Ise-Hachiōji became a branch line called the "Hachiōji Line".

Ownership of the line has changed a few times during its existence. Mie Tramway built the line in 1912 but control was transferred to Santetsu in 1916. Then in 1944, Santetsu, along with six other companies, merged to form Mie Transport (Sanco). During the latter part of the Santetsu era and the entire Sanco era, there was direct service offered between the now-separate Utsube Line and Yunoyama Line, which at that time was also a 762 mm (2 ft 6 in) gauge railway; the combination of these two train lines was called the Mie Line. In 1964, the railway department of Sanco become a separate company called Mie Electric Railway (Sanden), however this organization was short-lived as it was bought up by Kintetsu the following year.

In 1954 the initial portion of the route was re-routed by Sanco, which planned the re-routing because of Kintetsu's plan to re-route its Nagoya Line, which suffered from many sharp curves between Yokkaichi and Suwa stations. Kintetsu developed a plan to straighten the Nagoya Line as well as enlarge Suwa Station, which would be moved about a kilometre to the west; construction began in 1952 and took several years to complete. In accordance with this plan, Sanco altered its own Yokkaichi-area railways in 1956 to utilize the new location of Suwa Station, which was renamed to Kintetsu-Yokkaichi Station. From Akahori Station, the track to the old Suwa Station was closed and a new track was built to Kintetsu-Yokkaichi. At first, the direct connection with the Yunoyama Line was maintained however in 1964, the Yunoyama Line was altered and renovated to connect directly with the Nagoya Line and thus the connection with the Utsube Line was closed and direct service ended.

In August 2012, Kintetsu announced its wishes to close both the Utsube and Hachioji Lines, with plans to convert the trackbed into a dedicated bus route. The two lines together lose approximately ¥300 million annually. It has since been announced that Kintetsu would transfer the operation of these lines to the Yokkaichi City Government in 2015.

As a consequence, Yokkaichi Asunarou Railway was incorporated and took control of the line as from April 1, 2015. In this new scheme, the railway tracks and rolling stock are owned by the city government while Yokkaichi Asunarou Railway operates trains.

=== Timeline ===
- October 6, 1912 - Minami-Hamada (now closed) to Hinaga section opens (Mie Tramway).
- May 16, 1913 - Suwa to Minami-Hamada section opens.
- July 19, 1916 - Control of line is transferred to Mie Railway (Santetsu).
- March 30, 1916 - Yokkaichi (Kokutetsu) to Suwa section opens. Yokkaichi becomes origin of the line.
- December 1, 1916 - Based on train-related laws, the line's classification is officially changed from a tram to a light railway.
- January 10, 1922 - Hinanga to Ogoso section opens (Suzuka extension).
- June 21, 1922 - Ogoso to Utsube section opens. Utsube becomes the terminus of the line.
- November 29, 1927 - Yokkaichi to Suwa section closes. Suwa becomes the starting point of the line.
- March 1, 1928 - Gasoline-powered trains are introduced.
- March 1, 1931 - Santetsu acquires Yokkaichi Railway and what is now the Kintetsu Yunoyama Line. Direct connection with the Yunoyama Line opens.
- December 25, 1943 - The entire line is electrified.
- February 11, 1944 - Santetsu and six other companies merge to form Mie Transport (Sanco). The line is officially renamed the Sanco Mie Line.
- July 1, 1944 - Ogoso Station closes.
- November 1, 1944 - Minami-Hamada Station closes.
- September 23, 1956 - Suwa Station closed, moved, and re-opened as Kintetsu-Yokkaichi Station. The section between Suwa and Akahori closes. The section between Kintetsu-Yokkaichi and Akahori opens.
- December 23, 1956 - The voltage is increased from 600 V DC to 750 V DC.
- May 1, 1959 - Ogoso Station re-opens.
- August 24, 1959 - Electronic signal station added between Kintetsu-Yokkaichi and Akahori.
- February 1, 1964 - Sanco railway division splits off and forms a new company Mie Electric Railway (Sanden).
- March 23, 1964 - Connection with the Yunoyama Line is severed and direct service ends.
- April 1, 1965 - Sanden, and all of its lines, are acquired by Kintetsu. The line is officially renamed the Kintetsu Utsube Line.
- March 17, 1989 - Electronic signalling added to entire line. ATS System is introduced.
- June 1, 1989 - Wan man driver only operation begins.
- April 1, 2015 - Yokkaichi Asunarou Railway took control of the line.
