= Mikkaichi Station =

Railway station in Suzuka, Mie Prefecture, Japan

Mikkaichi Station 三日市駅
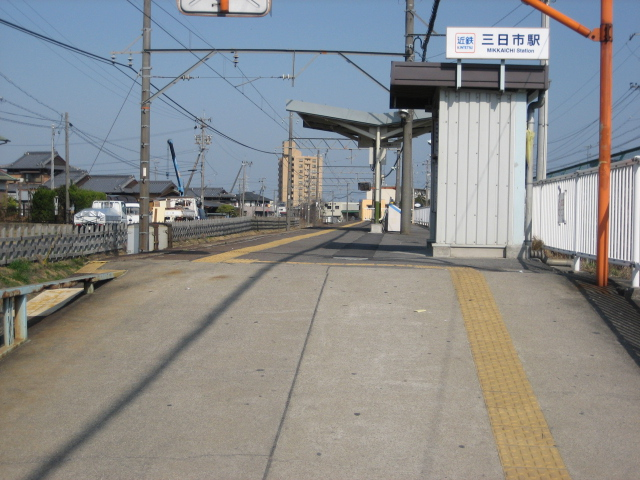
- Mikkaichi Station

General information
- Location: 2-6-1 Mikkaichi, Suzuka-shi, Mie-ken 513-0807; Japan
- Coordinates: 34.8801°N 136.5623°E
- Operator: Kintetsu Railway
- Line: Suzuka Line
- Distance: 6.2 km from Ise-Wakamatsu
- Platforms: 1 side platform

Other information
- Station code: L32
- Website: Official website

History
- Opened: April 8, 1963

Passengers
- FY2019: 885 daily
Location
- Location within Mie Prefecture Location within Japan

Mikkaichi Station (三日市駅, Mikkaichi-eki) is a passenger railway station in located in the city of Suzuka, Mie Prefecture, Japan, operated by the private railway operator Kintetsu Railway.

== Lines ==
Mikkaichi Station is a station on the Suzuka Line, and is located 6.2 rail kilometers from the opposing terminus of the line at Ise-Wakamatsu Station.

== Station layout ==
The station consists of a single side platform served by a single track. There is no station building. The station is unattended.

=== Platforms ===
1	■ Suzuka Line	For Ise-Wakamatsu; For Hiratachō

== Adjacent stations ==
«	Service	»
Suzuka Line
Suzukashi	Express	Hiratachō
Suzukashi	Local	Hiratachō

== History ==
Mikkaichi Station was opened on April 8, 1963.

== Passenger statistics ==
In fiscal 2019, the station was used by an average of 885 passengers daily (boarding passengers only).

== Surrounding area ==
- Mie Prefectural Road No. 54 Suzuka Loop Line
- Suzuka City Hall

== See also ==
- List of railway stations in Japan
