= Hinaga Station (Mie) =

Railway station in Yokkaichi, Mie Prefecture, Japan

Coordinates: 34.9563°N 136.6050°E

Hinaga Station 日永駅
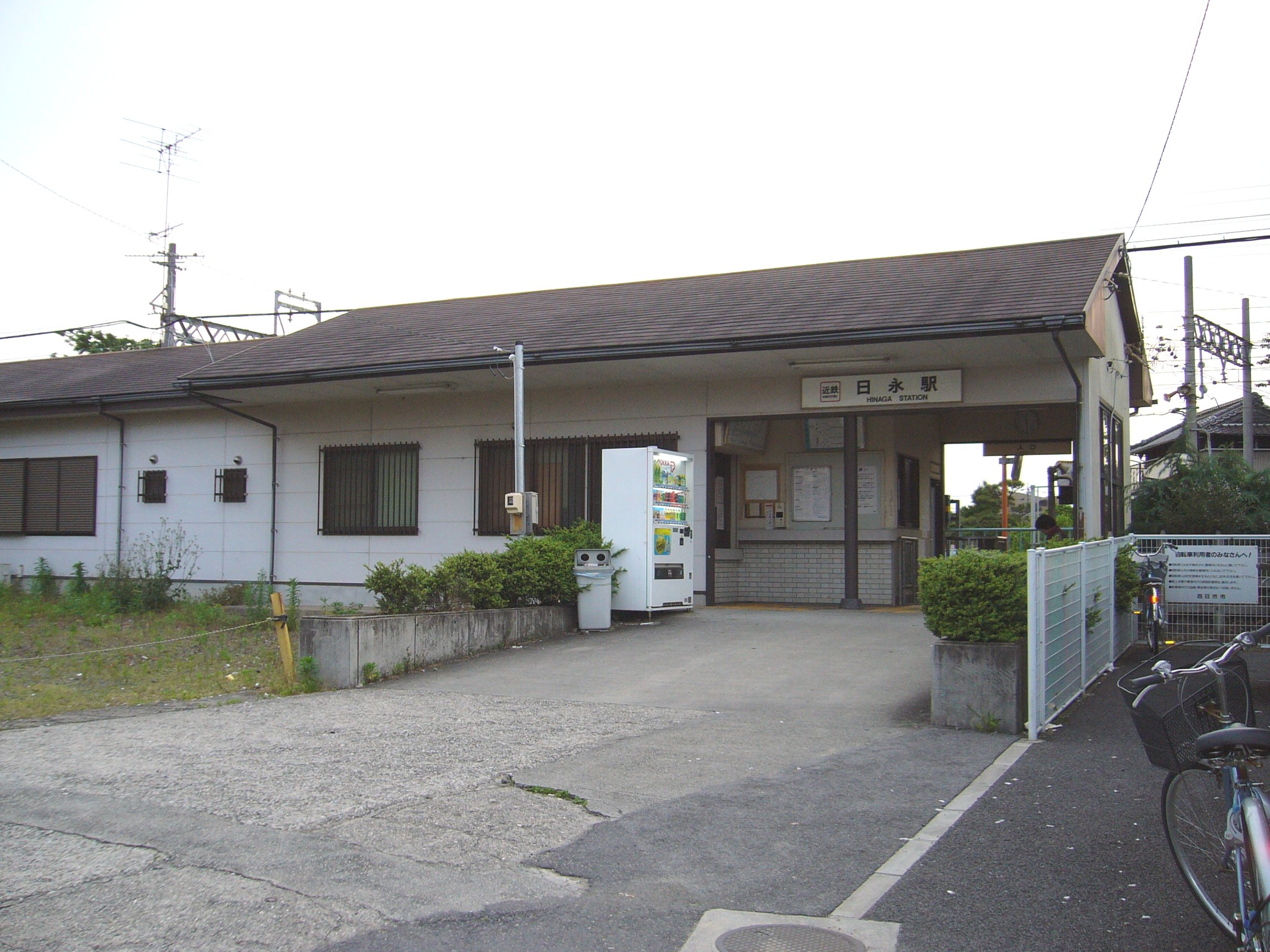
- Hinaga Station

General information
- Location: Hinaga1-14-6, Yokkaichi, Mie （三重県四日市市日永一丁目14-6） Japan
- Operator: Yokkaichi Asunarou Railway
- Lines: Utsube Line; Hachiōji Line

History
- Opened: August 14, 1912

Passengers
- FY2011: 448 daily
Location

Hinaga Station (日永駅, Hinaga-eki) is a railway station on the Yokkaichi Asunarou Railway Utsube Line and the Yokkaichi Asunarou Railway Hachiōji Line in Yokkaichi, Mie Prefecture, Japan, operated by the private railway operator Yokkaichi Asunarou Railway. It is 1.9 rail kilometers from the terminus of the Utsube Line at Asunarou Yokkaichi Station and is a terminal station for the Hachiōji Line.

== Lines ==
- Yokkaichi Asunarou Railway
  - Utsube Line
  - Hachiōji Line

== Layout ==
Hinaga Station has a single side platform and a triangular island platform serving three tracks. The station is unattended.

=== Platforms ===
1	■ Yokkaichi Asunarou Railway Utsube Line	for Utsube
2	■ Yokkaichi Asunarou Railway Utsube Line	from Utube for Yokkaichi
3	■ Yokkaichi Asunarou Railway Hachiōji Line	from Nishihino for Yokkaichi for Nishihino

== Adjacent stations ==
«	Service	»
Utsube Line
Akahori	Local	Minami-Hinaga
Hachiōji Line
Akahori	Local	Nishihino

== Surrounding area ==
- Tempaku River

== History ==
Hinaga Station was opened on August 14, 1912, as a station on the Mie Tramway Line, which became the Mie Railway in 1916. On February 11, 1944, due to mergers, the station came under the ownership of Sanco. On February 1, 1964, the Railway division of Sanco split off and formed a separate company, the Mie Electric Railway, which merged with Kintetsu on April 1, 1965.

The Utsube Line and the Hachiōji Line have been operated by the Yokkaichi Asunarou Railway since April 1, 2015.
