= Sangū Express Electric Railway =

Sangū Express Electric Railway (参宮急行電鉄, Sangū Kyūkō Dentetsu), usually abbreviated as Sankyū (参急), was a private railway company that operated in Nara Prefecture and Mie Prefecture, Japan for 14 years from 1927 to 1941, when it merged with its parent company, Ōsaka Electric Railroad (Daiki). Sankyū built a single train line which serviced the cities of Sakurai, Nabari, Matsusaka, and Ujiyamada, and the company acquired a second major line as well as a small local line from Ise Electric Railway (Iseden). These lines extended northwards from Matsusaka through cities in Mie Prefecture along the coast of Ise Bay as far as Kuwana. The infrastructure of Sankyū is now owned by Kintetsu and remains in use today.

Sankyū's main goal was to build a portion of a railway to Ujiyamada (now Ise) which is home to Ise Grand Shrine, the holiest Shinto shrine in Japan and a common pilgrimage destination. The word "Sangū" is a kanji abbreviation of a phrase in Japanese that roughly translates to "a pilgrimage to Ise Grand Shrine". Sankyū's line connected with a line originating in Osaka owned by its parent company, Daiki, and together the two offered direct rail service from Osaka to Ujiyamada on a line that was much more direct than that of its main rival, Kokutetsu. When Sankyū acquired Iseden, it then set its eyes on a direct connection between Osaka and Nagoya.

== Lines ==
=== Sankyū Main Line ===
Sankyū only built one train line which served as the second half of a railway linking Osaka and Ise Grand Shrine.

- Origin: Sakurai Station
- Terminus: Ujiyamada Station

=== Sankyū Ise Line ===
Sankyū acquired this line from Iseden and performed a major re-routing on part of the line to connect it with its own tracks at Ise-Nakagawa Station.

- Length: 82.9 km
- Origin: Kuwana Station
- Terminus: Ujiyamada Station

=== Sankyū Kambe Line ===
Small local line acquired from Iseden

- Length: 4.1 km
- Origin: Ise-Wakamatsu Station
- Terminus: Ise-Kambe Station (now Suzukashi Station)
