= Yanagi Station =

Railway station in Suzuka, Mie Prefecture, Japan

Yanagi Station 柳駅
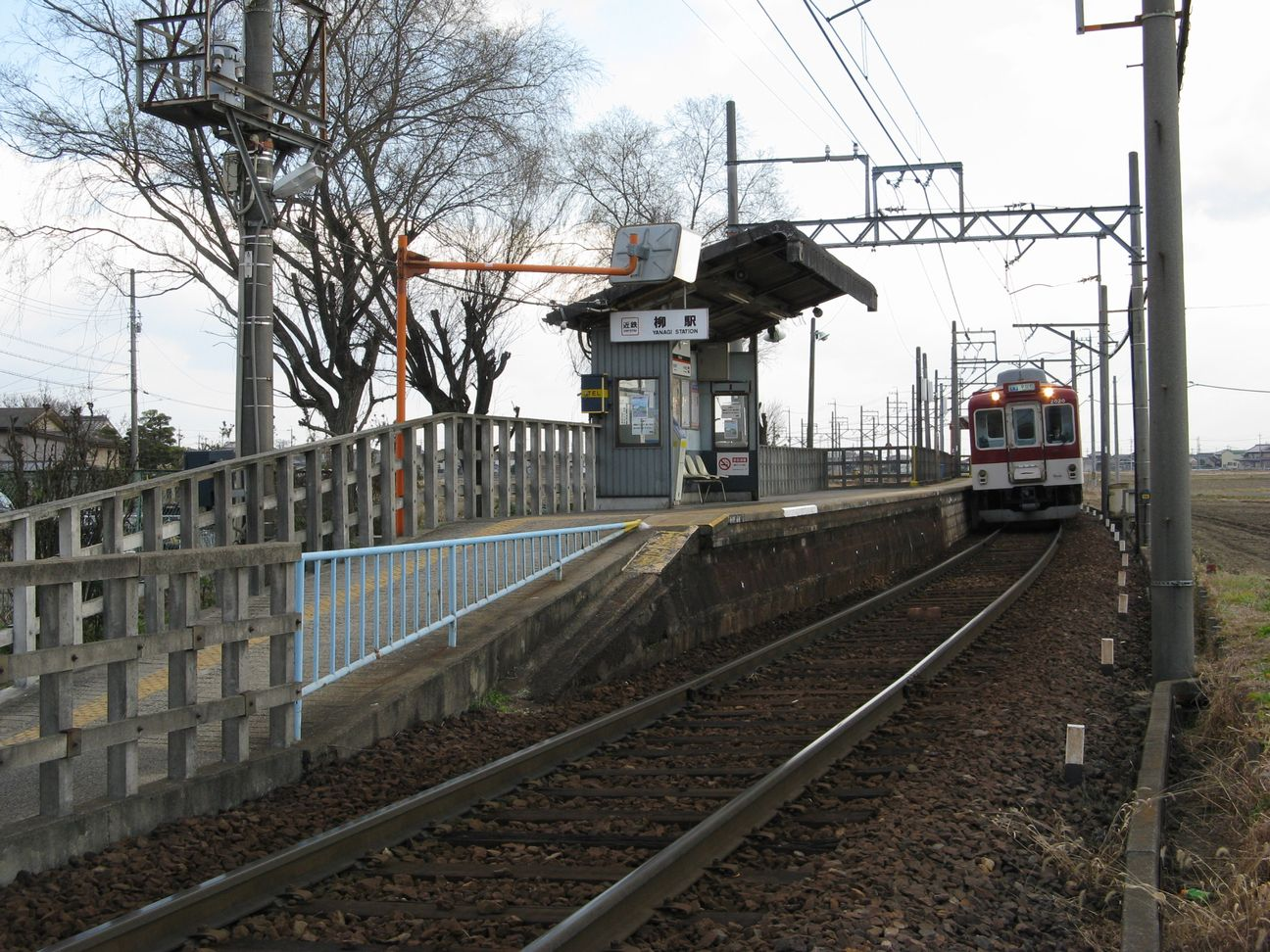
- Yanagi Station

General information
- Location: 726-4 Yanagimachi, Suzuka-shi, Mie-ken 513-0811; Japan
- Coordinates: 34.8715°N 136.5961°E
- Operator: Kintetsu Railway
- Line: Suzuka Line
- Distance: 2.2 km from Ise-Wakamatsu
- Platforms: 1 side platform

Other information
- Station code: L30
- Website: Official website

History
- Opened: December 20, 1925

Passengers
- FY2019: 183 daily
Location
- Location within Mie Prefecture Location within Japan

Yanagi Station (柳駅, Yanagi-eki) is a passenger railway station in located in the city of Suzuka, Mie Prefecture, Japan, operated by the private railway operator Kintetsu Railway.

== Lines ==
Yanagi Station is a station on the Suzuka Line, and is located 2.2 rail kilometers from the opposing terminus of the line at Ise-Wakamatsu Station.

== Station layout ==
The station consists of a single side platform served by a single track. There is no station building. The station is unattended.

=== Platforms ===
1	■ Suzuka Line	For Ise-Wakamatsu; For Hiratachō

== Adjacent stations ==
«	Service	»
Suzuka Line
Ise-Wakamatsu	Express	Suzukashi
Ise-Wakamatsu	Local	Suzukashi

== History ==
Yanagi Station opened on December 20, 1925 as a station on the Ise Railway’s Kambe Spur Line. The Ise Railway became the Sangu Express Electric Railway’s Ise-Kambe Line on September 15, 1936, and was renamed the Nagoya Line on December 7, 1938. After merging with Osaka Electric Kido on March 15, 1941, the line became the Kansai Express Railway's Nagoya Line. This line was merged with the Nankai Electric Railway on June 1, 1944 to form Kintetsu. It was renamed the Suzuka Line on April 8, 1963 The station has been unattended since October 1, 1994.

== Passenger statistics ==
In fiscal 2019, the station was used by an average of 183 passengers daily (boarding passengers only).

== Surrounding area ==
- Japan National Route 23

== See also ==
- List of railway stations in Japan
