= Ogoso Station =

Railway station in Yokkaichi, Mie Prefecture, Japan

Coordinates: 34.9288°N 136.5921°E

Ogoso Station 小古曽駅
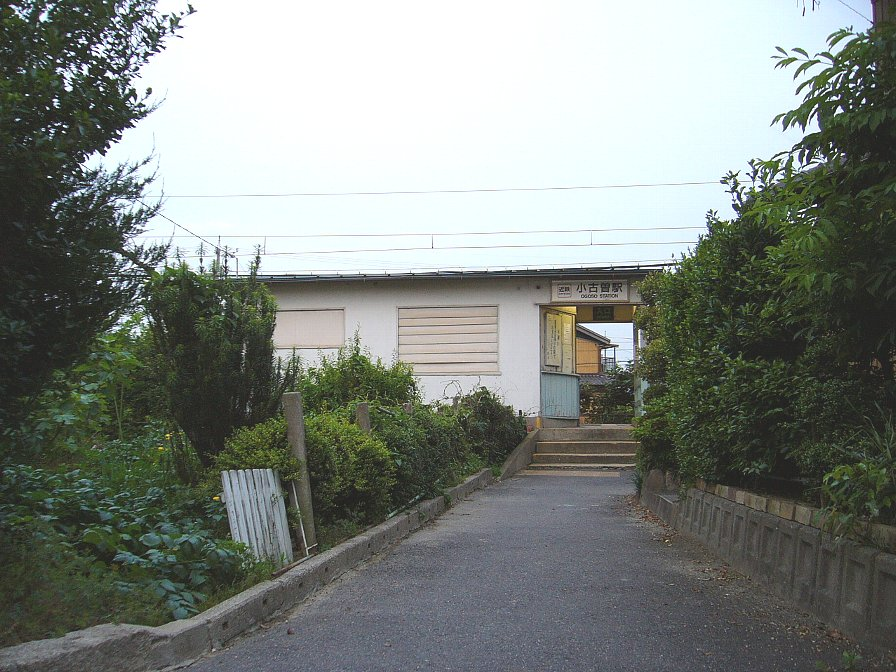
- Ogoso Station

General information
- Location: Ogoso 3-6-12, Yokkaichi, Mie （三重県四日市市小古曽二丁目6-12） Japan
- Operator: Kintetsu
- Line: Kintetsu Utsube Line

History
- Opened: June 22, 1922

Passengers
- FY2011: 163 daily
Location

Ogoso Station (小古曽駅, Ogoso-eki) is a railway station on the Kintetsu Utsube Line in Yokkaichi, Mie Prefecture, Japan, operated by the private railway operator Kintetsu. It is 5.0 rail kilometers from the terminus of the line at Kintetsu-Yokkaichi Station.

== Lines ==
- Kintetsu
  - Utsube Line

== Layout ==
Ogoso Station has a single side platform for bidirectional traffic.

=== Platforms ===
1	■ Kintetsu Utsube Line	For Kintetsu Yokkaichi; For Utsube

== Adjacent stations ==
«	Service	»
Kintetsu Utsube Line
Oiwake	Local	Utsube

== History ==
Ogoso Station was opened on June 22, 1922 as a station on the Mie Railway. The station was closed in January 1944, and reopened in May 1959 as a station on the Mie Kotsu, which later became the Mie Electric Railway, and which merged with Kintetsu on April 1, 1965.
