= Akahori =

Akahori (written: 赤堀, lit. "red moat") may refer to:

== People ==
- Motoyuki Akahori (赤堀 元之, born 1970) Japanese retired professional baseball player
- Satoru Akahori (あかほり さとる / 赤堀 悟, born 1965), Japanese scriptwriter, novelist and manga author

== Other uses ==
- Akahori Gedou Hour Rabuge, a Japanese television series
- Akahori Station, a railway station in Japan
