= Ise Electric Railway =

Railway company in Japan

Ise Electric Railway (伊勢電気鉄道, Ise Denki Tetsudō), usually abbreviated as Iseden (伊勢電), was a private railway company that operated mostly in Mie Prefecture, Japan, for 25 years from 1911 to 1936, when it was absorbed by Sangū Express Electric Railway. At its height, Iseden operated three train lines, two of which it planned and built, that serviced the cities of Yokkaichi, Tsu, Suzuka, Matsusaka, Ujiyamada, and Ōgaki. Much of the infrastructure of Iseden is now owned by Kintetsu and remains in use today.

Ise Electric Railway Linemap 1936

The name "Ise" was chosen for use in the company's name because the area of Japan that Iseden served, northern and central Mie Prefecture, was called Ise Province during the Edo era before the modern prefecture system was put into effect.

== History ==
In the Taishō period, the only train lines in all of Mie Prefecture were the Kansai Main Line, the Kisei Main Line (though not entirely completed), and the Sangū Line, all of which were operated by Kokutetsu (now JR Central). However, travel between the two primary cities in the prefecture, Yokkaichi and Tsu, was indirect on these existing lines and so a regional railway company formed with the goal of constructing a line that ran straight between the two cities; this was how Iseden came to be. The company was founded in 1911 under the name of Ise Railway (伊勢鉄道 Ise Tetsudō), however it was changed to Ise Electric Railway in 1926 when the company began electrifying its lines.

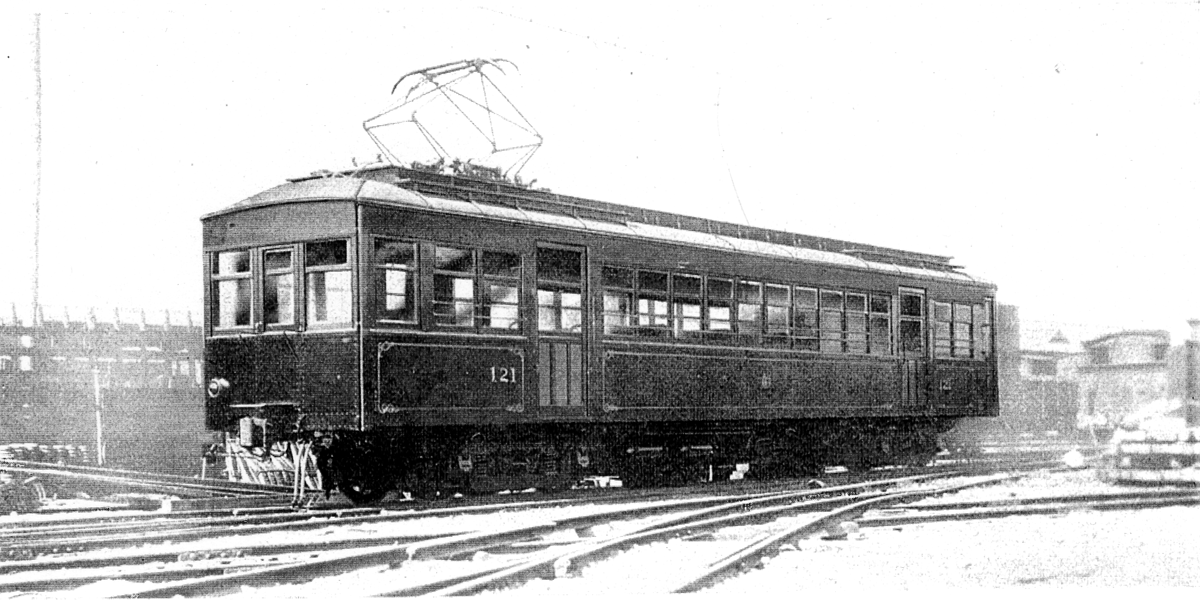
Ise Electric Railway Deha 121 type

=== Kumazawa ===
The first line, known as the Iseden Main Line, ran between stations in central Yokkaichi and Tsu and was built with a single track, no electrification, and many sharp curves to wind through existing settlements; this was due to the line being planned and built by inexperienced railway architects and engineers. The second line, the short Kambe Line, suffered from the same design problems. However, shortly before the company was renamed, a well-known industrialist named Kazuei Kumazawa (熊沢一衛 Kumazawa Kazuei), whose nickname was "The Flying Shōgun of Tōkai", took the reins as president and used his influence to push some improvements through. By 1930, all lines were electrified, the Main Line was extended from Yokkaichi to Kuwana in the north and from Tsu to Ise Grand Shrine in Ujiyamada (now Ise) in the south, dual tracks were added, and Iseden acquired Yōrō Railway and thereby procured its third train line, the Yōrō Line which allowed the company's tracks to stretch northward to Ōgaki in Gifu Prefecture. Kumazawa's tactics tended to be heavy-handed but were effective at the time.

=== Downfall ===
==== Scandal ====
From Kuwana, Iseden planned to extend its Main Line across the Kiso Three Rivers to Nagoya, paralleling the existing Kansai Main Line, in hopes of offering direct service from Nagoya to Ise that would be much faster than its Kokutetsu rival. However, the implementation of this plan was fraught with problems and was the beginning of the end for Iseden. The plan worked out by the company called for buying an existing, out-of-use Kokutetsu bridge crossing the considerably wide rivers and then building a relatively short dual track section the rest of the way to Nagoya Station. This plan initially received approval from the Japanese national government (which owned Kokutetsu), but it was soon learned that Kumazawa and Iseden had bribed the Japanese Minister of Transportation in hopes of having him convince Kokutetsu to sell the old bridge to Iseden for less money. Kumazawa stepped down, labor strife arose, and the company's image was heavily damaged; this made the Nagoya-extension plan impossible at the time and so it was put off. On top of these problems, Iseden had invested too much money during the late 1920s and, due to the worldwide Great Depression starting in 1929, the company often found itself in financial trouble.

==== Competition with Sankyū ====
The fatal blow, however, came from competition with Sangū Express Electric Railway (Sankyū) and the opening in 1930 of the Sankyū Main Line, a rival line that paralleled the southern section of the Iseden Main Line. In fact, the Sankyū line opened within weeks of the completion of the Iseden's Tsu ~ Ujiyamada extension. During the construction of the two lines, the two companies held some meetings with each other and eventually Sankyū put forth a joint-business plan crafted to allow both companies to prosper. Passengers would've been offered a special travel package to ride from Osaka to Ujiyamada on Sankyū, visit Ise Grand Shrine and other spots, then ride from Ujiyamada to Nagoya on Iseden for more sight-seeing, with a similar package for the reverse direction as well. However, since Iseden was unable to extend its Main Line north to Nagoya, this joint plan never came to fruition and tension arose between the two companies. Misunderstandings that arose from Iseden's Nagoya-style business practices and Sankyū's Osaka-style business practices also added considerably to that tension. The two rival companies fought on during the 1930s, both pouring a lot of money into their lines. Ridership on the Iseden Main Line did increase, but not as much as hoped and not nearly as much as the increase that the Sankyū Main Line saw at that time; this was simply because Sankyū linked with Osaka, a major city, but Iseden only linked with Kuwana and Ōgaki which are much smaller cities. Eventually a merger battle broke out with Sankyū aiming to acquire Iseden in hopes of offering direct service between Osaka and Nagoya. In the end, Iseden, along with its three lines, was absorbed by Sankyū in 1936.

Iseden's original plan to extend its Main Line from Kuwana to Nagoya was carried out and completed in 1938 by another company and that section, along with the rest of Iseden's lines and infrastructure, were ultimately absorbed by Kintetsu in 1944.

It can be said that the mixture of competition from Sankyū, which provided direct rail service to Ujiyamada from a major metropolitan area, and Iseden's inability to connect its own line with a major metropolitan area of similar size was the main cause of the company's downfall.

=== Timeline ===
- November 10, 1911 - Ise Railway founded.
- March 1, 1922 - Iseden Main Line (Yokkaichi ~ Tsu) completed, original goal of connecting Mie's two primary cities is achieved.
- December 20, 1925 - Iseden Kambe Line opens.
- September 21, 1926 - Company officially renamed to Ise Electric Railway. Electrification of lines begins.
- January 30, 1929 - Iseden Main Line extended, Kuwana ~ Yokkaichi section opens.
- October 1, 1929 - Company acquires Yōrō Railway.
- April 1, 1930 - Iseden Main Line extended, Tsu ~ Shin-Matsusaka section opens.
- December 25, 1930 - Iseden Main Line extended, Shin-Matsusaka ~ Daijingū-mae (Ujiyamada) section opens. Sankyū Main Line also opens shortly prior to this.
- May 20, 1936 - Company relinquishes control of Yōrō Line.
- September 15, 1936 - Ise Electric Railway is dissolved. Sankyū absorbs the lines of Iseden.
- June 1, 1944 - Iseden's former lines come under the ownership of Kintetsu.

== Lines ==
=== Main Line ===
The Iseden Main Line connected Kuwana, Mie to Ujiyamada, Mie (Ise, Mie). It followed the coastline through Mie Prefecture's primary cities and terminated near the Outer Shrine of Ise Grand Shrine. There were plans to extend the line from Kuwana to Nagoya however this was not implemented until after Iseden was dissolved. The Kuwana ~ Edobashi section of this line became part of the Kintetsu Nagoya Line. Of the remaining sections, the Shin-Matsusaka ~ Daijingū-mae section was closed in 1942 because it could not compete with the Sankyū Main Line, and the Edobashi ~ Shin-Matsusaka section was closed in 1961.

- Length: 82.9 km
- Origin: Kuwana Station
- Terminus: Daijingū-mae Station

=== Kambe Line ===
The Iseden Kambe Line is now part of the Kintetsu Suzuka Line which was extended in 1962.

- Length: 4.1 km
- Origin: Ise-Wakamatsu Station
- Terminus: Ise-Kambe Station (now Suzukashi Station).

=== Yōrō Line ===
The Iseden Yōrō Line became the Kintetsu Yōrō Line. As of 2007, it is now operated by Yōrō Railway but is still owned by Kintetsu.

- Length: 57.5 km
- Origin: Kuwana Station
- Terminus: Ibi Station

== Connections ==
The lines of Ise Electric Railway connected with other railways at the following stations:

| Iseden Line | Station | Connecting Line |
|---|---|---|
| Main Line | Kuwana | Kansai Main Line |
| Main Line | Yokkaichi | Kansai Main Line |
| Main Line | Edobashi | Sankyū Tsu Line |
| Main Line | Iseden-Tsu | Kisei Main Line |
| Main Line | Matsugasaki | Sankyū Main Line |
| Main Line | Hanaoka | Matsusaka Electric Railway |
| Main Line | Tokuwa | Kisei Main Line |
| Yōrō Line | Ōgaki | Tōkaidō Main Line |
