= Suzukashi Station =

Railway station in Suzuka, Mie Prefecture, Japan

Suzukashi Station 鈴鹿市駅
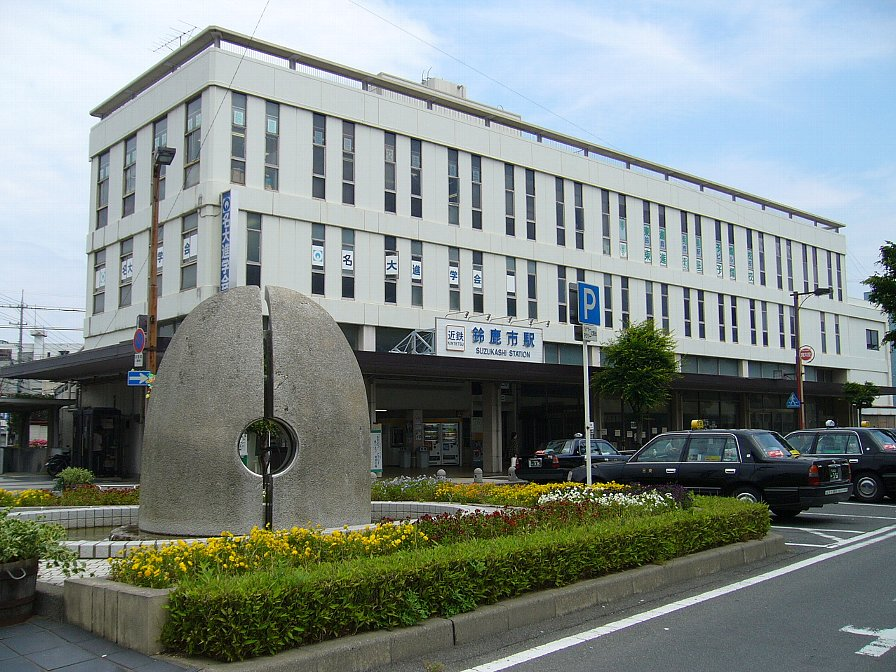
- Suzukashi Station

General information
- Location: 1-1-1 Kambe, Suzuka-shi, Mie-ken 513-0801; Japan
- Coordinates: 34.8839°N 136.5828°E
- Operator: Kintetsu Railway
- Line: Suzuka Line
- Distance: 4.1 km from Ise-Wakamatsu
- Platforms: 2 side platforms

Other information
- Station code: L31
- Website: Official website

History
- Opened: December 20, 1925
- Former names: Ise-Kambe (until 1963)

Passengers
- FY2019: 1935 daily
Location
- Location within Mie Prefecture Location within Japan

Suzukashi Station (鈴鹿市駅, Suzukashi-eki) is a passenger railway station in located in the city of Suzuka, Mie Prefecture, Japan, operated by the private railway operator Kintetsu Railway.

== Lines ==
Suzukashi Station is a station on the Suzuka Line, and is located 4.1 rail kilometers from the opposing terminus of the line at Ise-Wakamatsu Station.

== Station layout ==
The station consists of two opposed side platforms connected by a level crossing.

=== Platforms ===
1	■ Suzuka Line	for Ise-Wakamatsu, Kintetsu Nagoya, Ōsaka Namba
2	■ Suzuka Line	for Hiratachō

== Adjacent stations ==
«	Service	»
Suzuka Line
Yanagi	Express	Mikkaichi
Yanagi	Local	Mikkaichi

== History ==
Suzukashi Station opened on December 20, 1925, as Ise-Kambe Station (伊勢神戸駅, Ise-Kamebe eki) on the Ise Railway’s Kambe Spur Line. The Ise Railway became the Sangu Express Electric Railway’s Ise-Kambe Line on September 15, 1936, and was renamed the Nagoya Line on December 7, 1938. After merging with Osaka Electric Kido on March 15, 1941, the line became the Kansai Express Railway's Nagoya Line. This line was merged with the Nankai Electric Railway on June 1, 1944, to form Kintetsu. The line was renamed the Suzuka Line on April 8, 1963, at which time the station was renamed to its present name.

== Passenger statistics ==
In fiscal 2019, the station was used by an average of 1935 passengers daily (boarding passengers only).

== Surrounding area ==
- Suzuka City Hall
- Kambe Castle ruins

== See also ==
- List of railway stations in Japan
