= Yokkaichi Asunarou Railway Hachiōji Line =

Railway line in Mie Prefecture, Japan

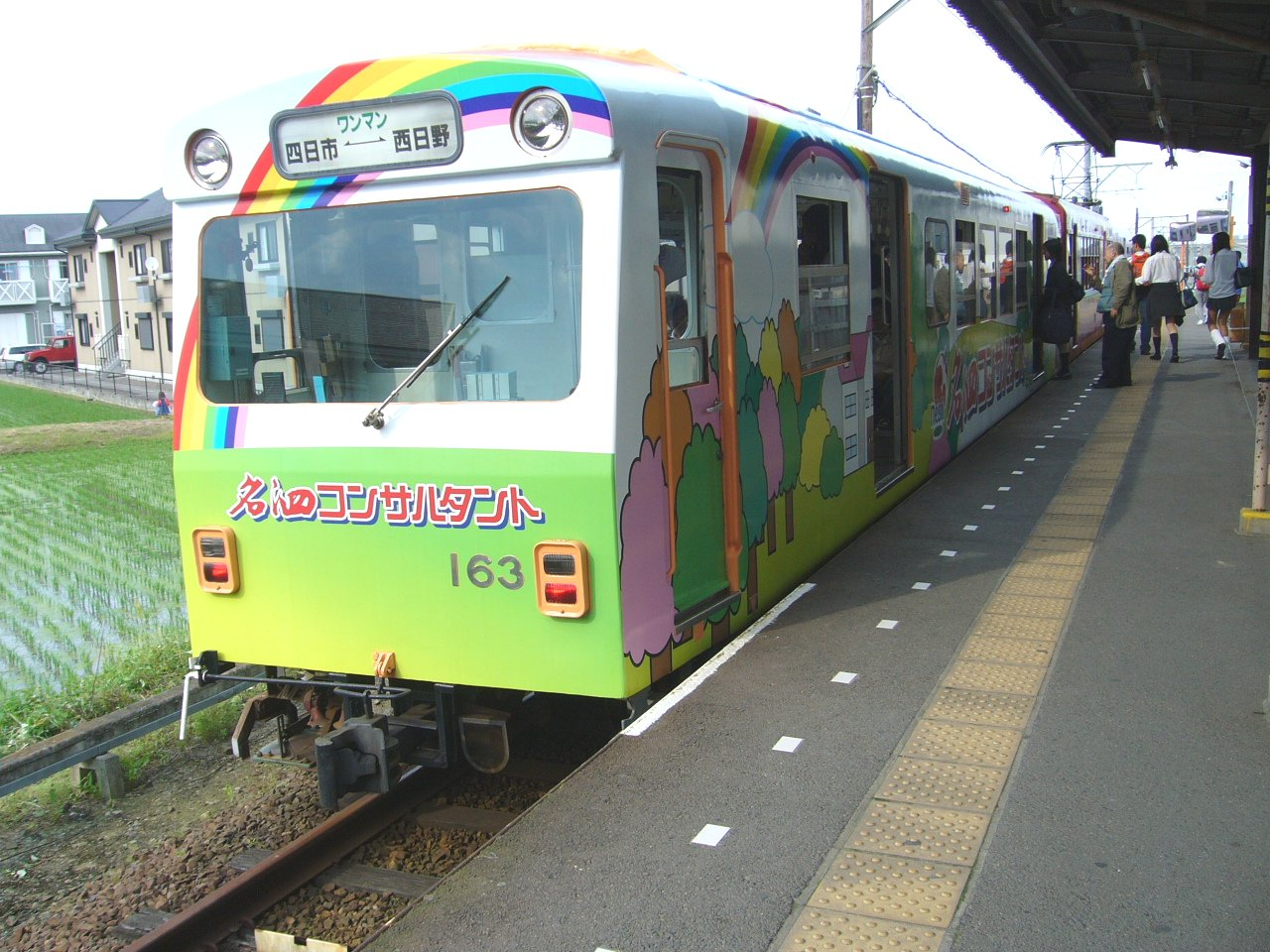
- Narrow gauge train at Nishihino Station

Overview
- Locale: Yokkaichi, Mie Prefecture
- Termini: Hinaga; Nishihino
- Stations: 2

Service
- Type: Commuter rail
- Operator(s): Yokkaichi Asunarou Railway

History
- Opened: August 15, 1912; 113 years ago

Technical
- Line length: 1.3 km (0.81 mi)
- Number of tracks: 1
- Track gauge: 762 mm (2 ft 6 in)
- Electrification: 750 V DC Overhead line

The Yokkaichi Asunarou Railway Hachiōji Line (四日市あすなろう鉄道八王子線, Yokkaichi Asunarō Tetsudō Hachiōji-sen) is a 762 mm (2 ft 6 in) narrow gauge railway line operated by the Japanese private railway company Yokkaichi Asunarou Railway, connecting Hinaga Station and Nishihino Station, both in the city of Yokkaichi, Mie, Japan. It extends for a total length of 1.3 kilometres (0.81 mi).

The line connects with the Yokkaichi Asunarou Railway Utsube Line at Hinaga. Because all trains on the Hachiōji Line offer direct service to Asunarou Yokkaichi via the Utsube Line, the two lines are collectively called the Utsube-Hachiōji Line (内部・八王子線, Utsube-Hachiōji-sen).

The line is called the "Hachiōji Line" because it originally ran to Ise-Hachiōji Station, however for many years the endpoint has been Nishihino.

Until March 2015, the line was under control of Kintetsu, a major railway company.

== Narrow gauge railway ==
The line was originally built as a tram utilising a track gauge of 762mm, which was relatively common at that time for such local lines. Later on the legal classification of the line was changed from a tram to a light rail, however the gauge was not widened, unlike the majority of 762mm gauge lines. Today, there are only four 762 mm (2 ft 6 in) gauge railway lines in operation in Japan, and the Hachiōji Line is both the oldest and shortest of those four.

== Services ==
"Local" (普通, Futsū) services stop at every station.
All trains are wanman driver only operation.
Trains run twice per hour in both directions.
All trains operate a through service to/from Asunarou Yokkaichi via Utsube Line.

== Stations ==
Station		Distance (km)	Transfers	Location	
↑ All trains operate a through service to/from Asunarou Yokkaichi via Utsube Line ↑
Hinaga	日永	0.0	Yokkaichi Asunarou Railway Utsube Line (through service)	Yokkaichi	Mie Prefecture
Nishihino	西日野	1.3		Yokkaichi	Mie Prefecture

== History ==
The Hachiōji Line was built in 1912 and, like the Kintetsu Utsube Line, is one of Kintetsu's oldest train lines. The Hachiōji Line was actually built first, but became a branch line after the original section of what is now the much longer Utsube Line was opened later the same year. Steam engines ran on the line for many years until 1928 when gasoline-powered trains were introduced, which ran until the line was electrified in 1948.

Ownership of the line has shifted a few times during its existence. Mie Tramway built the line but control was given to Mie Railway (Santetsu) shortly after in 1916. Then in 1944, Santetsu, along with six other companies, merged to form Mie Transport (Sanco). Twenty years later, the railway department of Sanco split off to become a separate company called Mie Electric Railway (Sanden), however this organization was short-lived as it was bought up by railway giant Kintetsu the following year.

=== Flood damage ===
As the line's official name indicates, Nishihino is not the original terminus. When the line was built it was 2.8 kilometers in length and extended past Nishihino and terminated in Yokkaichi's Hachiōji neighborhood and for over 60 years, trains went all the way to Ise-Hachiōji Station. However, in 1974, there was an especially heavy rainstorm that flooded the Tenpaku River which runs right alongside the line. The track suffered from severe water damage and the entire line was temporarily shut down for repairs. The track was repaired only as far as Nishihino, and the rest of the line was abandoned. The remainder of the line, only 1.3 kilometers long, was reopened in 1976.

Because so many years have passed since the endpoint was changed to Nishihino, younger generations primarily refer to the line as the Nishihino Line, a name that was even used by some Kintetsu train conductors.

In August 2012, Kintetsu announced its wishes to close both the Utsube and Hachioji Lines, with plans to convert the trackbed into a dedicated bus route. The two lines together lose approximately ¥300 million annually. It has since been announced that Kintetsu would transfer the operation of these lines to the Yokkaichi City Government in 2015.

As a consequence, Yokkaichi Asunarou Railway was incorporated and took control of the line as from April 1, 2015. In this new scheme, the railway tracks and rolling stock are owned by the city government while Yokkaichi Asunarou Railway operates trains.

=== Timeline ===
- August 15, 1912 – Hinaga to Ise-Hachiōji sections opens (Mie Tramway).
- July 19, 1916 – Control of line is transferred to Mie Railway (Santetsu).
- December 1, 1916 – Based on train-related laws, the line's classification is officially changed from a tram to a light railway.
- March 1, 1928 – Gasoline-powered trains introduced.
- February 11, 1944 – Santetsu and six other companies merge to form Mie Transport (Sanco). Line becomes part of the Sanco Mie Line.
- September 10, 1948 – Entire line electrified.
- February 1, 1964 – Sanco railway division splits off and forms a new company named Mie Electric Railway (Sanden).
- April 1, 1965 – Sanden, and all of its lines, are acquired by Kintetsu. Line officially renamed Kintetsu Hachiōji Line.
- July 25, 1974 – Operation on entire line is suspended due to flood damage.
- April 1, 1976 – After repairs, Hinaga to Nishihino section reopens. Nishihino to Ise-Hachiōji permanently closes.
- April 1, 2015 – Yokkaichi Asunarou Railway took control of the line.
