= Hiratachō Station =

Railway station in Suzuka, Mie Prefecture, Japan

Hiratachō Station 平田町駅
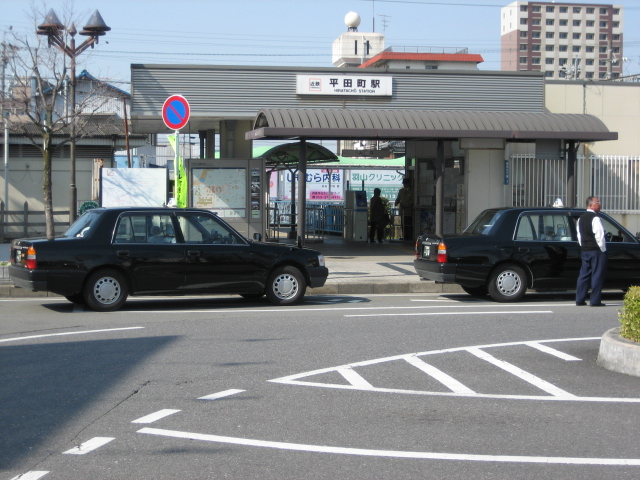
- Hiratachō Station

General information
- Location: 3-1-1 Sanjo, Suzuka-shi, Mie-ken 513-0806; Japan
- Coordinates: 34°52′29″N 136°32′31″E
- Operator: Kintetsu Railway
- Line: Suzuka Line
- Distance: 8.2 km from Ise-Wakamatsu
- Platforms: 1 side platform
- Tracks: 1

Construction
- Structure type: At-grade
- Accessible: Yes (Ramps to platform level)

Other information
- Station code: L33
- Website: Official website

History
- Opened: April 8, 1963

Passengers
- FY2019: 3248 daily
Location
- Location within Mie Prefecture Location within Japan

Hiratachō Station (平田町駅, Hiratachō-eki) is a passenger railway station in located in the city of Suzuka, Mie Prefecture, Japan, operated by the private railway operator Kintetsu Railway.

== Lines ==
Hiratachō Station is a terminus of the Suzuka Line, and is located 8.2 rail kilometers from the opposing terminus of the line at Ise-Wakamatsu Station.

== Station layout ==
The station was consists of a single side platform served by a single track. All trains depart for Ise-Wakamatsu.

=== Platforms ===
1	■ Suzuka Line	For Ise-Wakamatsu

== Adjacent stations ==
«	Service	»
Suzuka Line
Mikkaichi	Express	Terminus
Mikkaichi	Local	Terminus

== History ==
Hiratachō Station was opened on April 8, 1963 when the Suzuka Line was extended from Suzukashi Station. PiTaPa usage commenced from April 1, 2007.

== Passenger statistics ==
In fiscal 2019, the station was used by an average of 3248 passengers daily (boarding passengers only).

== Surrounding area ==
Hiratachō Station is at the center of Suzuka's main commercial and shopping area. Nearby lie several large malls, including: the Aeon Suzuka Shopping Center (also known as Bell City, the largest shopping center in the prefecture), the Suzuka Hunter Shopping Center, and Loc Town Suzuka. Also nearby is Suzuka Circuit; the only direct access via public transportation is by taxi. Going by bus requires an intermediate transfer. Shiroko Station is closer to the circuit.

Other points of interest include:

- Mie Prefectural Hiino Senior High School
- Suzuka Junior/Senior High School (private)
- Honda - Suzuka Plant

== See also ==
- List of railway stations in Japan
