= Nishihino Station =

Railway station in Yokkaichi, Mie Prefecture, Japan

Coordinates: 34°57′10″N 136°35′27″E

Nishihino Station 西日野駅
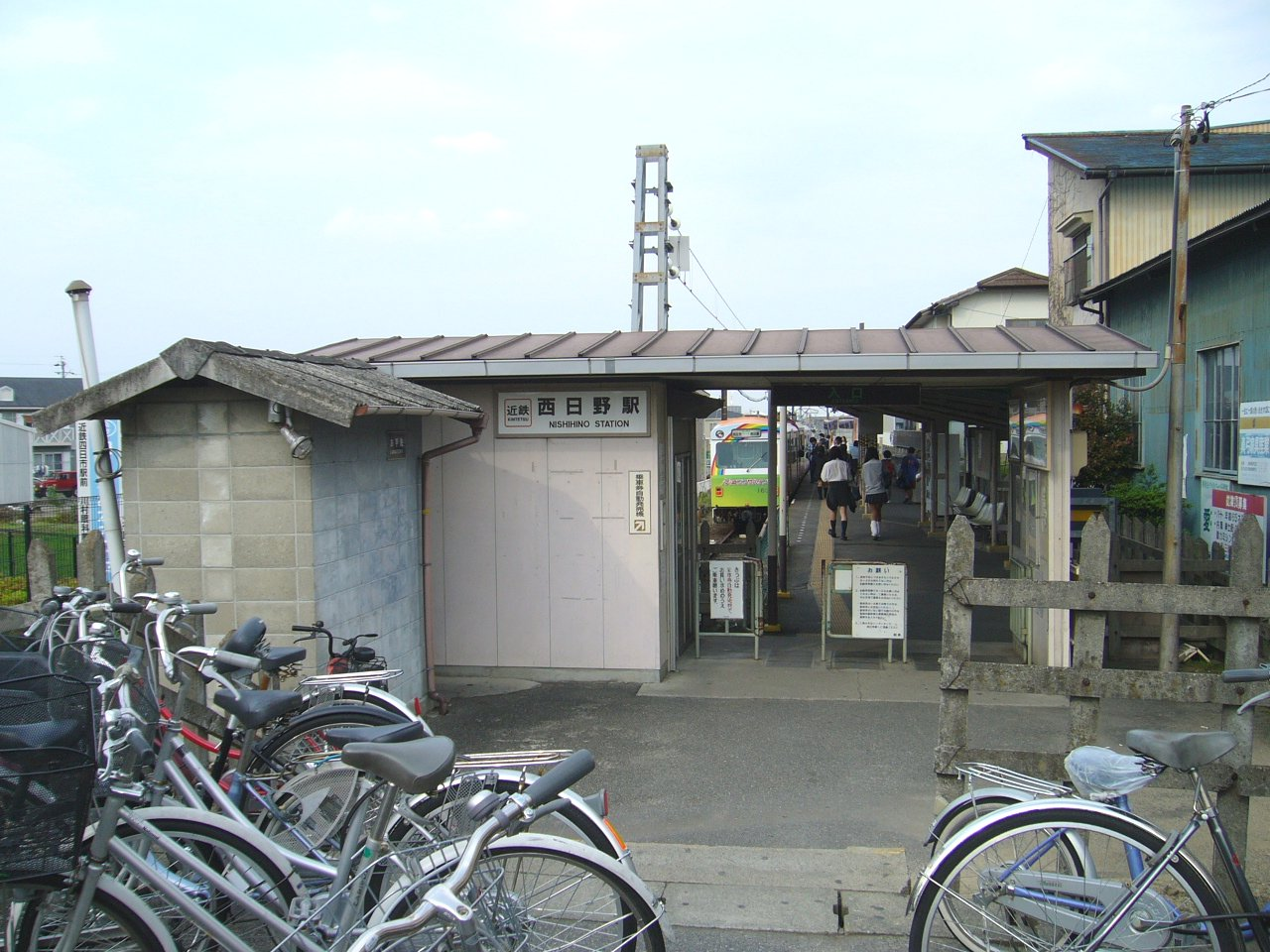
- Nishihino Station

General information
- Location: Nishihino Higashiura 30, Yokkaichi, Mie （三重県四日市市西日野字東浦30） Japan
- Operator: Kintetsu Railway
- Line: Kintetsu Hachiōji Line

History
- Opened: October 14, 1912

Passengers
- FY2011: 1575 daily
Location

Nishihino Station (西日野駅, Nishihino-eki) is a terminal railway station on the two-station Kintetsu Hachiōji Line in Yokkaichi, Mie Prefecture, Japan, operated by the private railway operator Kintetsu. It is 1.3 rail kilometers from the terminus of the Hachiōji Line at Hinaga Station and is 3.1 rail kilometers Kintetsu-Yokkaichi Station.

== Lines ==
- Kintetsu Railway
  - Hachiōji Line

== Layout ==
Nishihino Station has a single side platform serving bi-directional traffic. The station is unattended.

=== Platforms ===
1	■ Kintetsu Hachiōji Line	For Hinaga, Kintetsu Yokkaichi

== Adjacent stations ==
«	Service	»
Kintetsu Hachiōji Line
Hinaga	Local	Terminus

== Surrounding area ==
- Yokkaichi-Minami High School
- Tempaku River
- Sasagawa Middle School
- Nanbyukyuryo Park
- Nishihino Niji Gakuen

== History ==
Nishihino Station was opened on October 14, 1912 as a station on the Mie Tramway Line, which became the Mie Railway in 1916. On February 11, 1944, due to mergers, the station came under the ownership of Sanco. In November 1944, the station was rebuilt 100 meters closer towards present-day Kintetsu Yokkaichi Station. On February 1, 1964 the Railway division of Sanco split off and formed a separate company, the Mie Electric Railway, which merged with Kintetsu on April 1, 1965. On September 25, 1974, the Kintetsu Hachiōji Line ceased operations from Hinaga Station to its terminus at Ise-Hachiōji Station after portions of the track were washed away by heavy rains. On April 1, 1976 operations resumed as far as Nishihino Station, but the remainder of the line remains closed with no plans to resume operations.
