= Ise-Wakamatsu Station =

Railway station in Suzuka, Mie Prefecture, Japan

Ise-Wakamatsu Station 伊勢若松駅
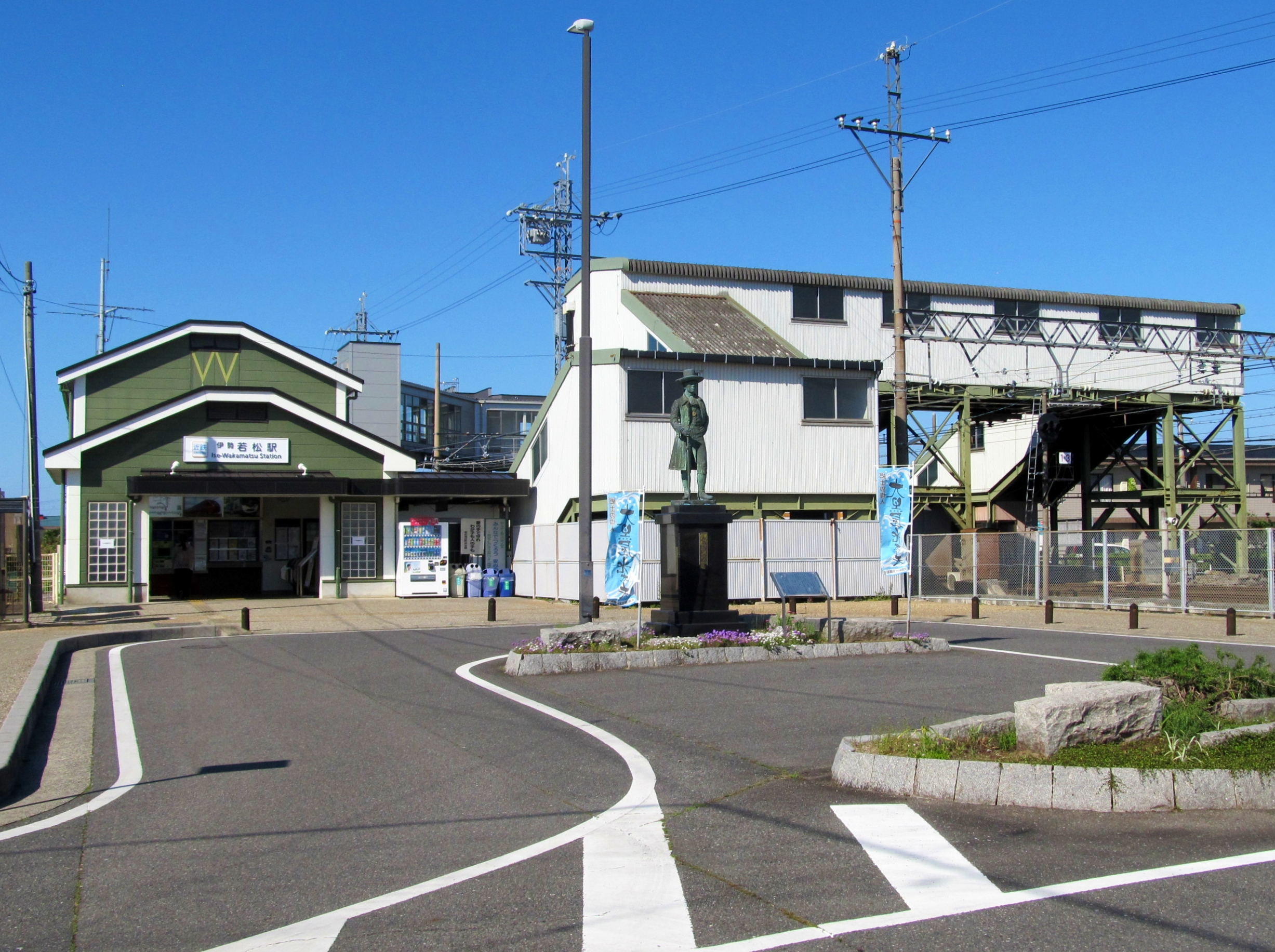
- Ise-Wakamatsu Station in May 2026

General information
- Location: 17-8 Wakamatsu-nishi 4-chome, Suzuka-shi, Mie-ken 510-0222; Japan
- Coordinates: 34°52′8.9″N 136°36′58.7″E
- Operator: Kintetsu Railway
- Lines: Nagoya Line; Suzuka Line
- Distance: 40.8 km from Kintetsu Nagoya
- Platforms: 2 side platforms

Other information
- Station code: E29 (Nagoya Line); L29 (Suzuka Line)
- Website: Official website

History
- Opened: December 22, 1917

Passengers
- FY2019: 1135 daily

Services
Preceding station	Kintetsu Railway	Following station
Chiyozaki E30 towards Ise-Nakagawa	Nagoya Line Local	Mida E28 towards Kintetsu-Nagoya
Shiroko E31 towards Ise-Nakagawa	Nagoya Line Express	Shiohama E24 towards Kintetsu-Nagoya
Yanagi L30 towards Hiratachō	Suzuka Line Local	Terminus
Yanagi L30 towards Hiratachō	Suzuka Line Express	through to Nagoya Line
Location
- Location within Mie Prefecture Location within Japan

Ise-Wakamatsu Station (伊勢若松駅, Ise-Wakamatsu-eki) is a junction passenger railway station located in the city of Suzuka, Mie Prefecture, Japan, operated by the private railway operator Kintetsu.

== Lines ==
Ise-Wakamatsu Station is a station on the Nagoya Line and is located 40.8 rail kilometers from the terminus of the line at Kintetsu Nagoya Station. It is also a terminus for the Suzuka Line, and is located 8.2 rail kilometers from the opposing terminus of the line at Hiratachō Station.

== Station layout ==
The station consists of two island platforms serving four tracks, connected by a footbridge.

=== Platforms ===
1	■ Nagoya Line	for Tsu, Osaka Namba and Kashikojima
1	■ Suzuka Line	for Hiratachō
2	■ Nagoya Line	for Tsu, Osaka Namba and Kashikojima
2	■ Suzuka Line	for Hiratachō
3	■ Nagoya Line	for Yokkaichi and Nagoya
4	■ Nagoya Line	for Yokkaichi and Nagoya
4	■ Suzuka Line	for Hiratachō

== History ==
Ise-Wakamatsu Station opened on December 22, 1917 as a station on the Ise Railway. The Ise Railways Kambe Spur Line (which was renamed the Suzuka Line in 1963) started operations from December 20, 1925. The Ise Railway became the Sangu Express Electric Railway’s Ise Line on September 15, 1936, and was renamed the Nagoya Line on December 7, 1938. After merging with Osaka Electric Kido on March 15, 1941, the line became the Kansai Express Railway's Nagoya Line. This line was merged with the Nankai Electric Railway on June 1, 1944 to form Kintetsu. The station building was modified with overpasses connecting the platforms in 1967.

== Passenger statistics ==
In fiscal 2019, the station was used by an average of 1135 passengers daily (boarding passengers only).

== Surrounding area ==
- Mie Prefectural Road No. 6 Yokkaichi Kusunoki Suzuka Line
- Mie Prefectural Road 552 Ise-Wakamatsu Stop Line
- Suzuka City Wakamatsu Elementary School

== See also ==
- List of railway stations in Japan
