= Yokkaichi Asunarou Railway =

Railway Company in Mie Prefecture, Japan

System map of the Yokkaichi Asunarou Railway

Yokkaichi Asunarou Railway (四日市あすなろう鉄道, Yokkaichi Asunarō Tetsudō) is a third-sector railway company in Yokkaichi, Mie, Japan. The company is 75% owned by Kintetsu Railway and 25% owned by the city government of Yokkaichi.

The company operates the Utsube Line and the Hachiōji Line in Yokkaichi. Both lines are 762 mm (2 ft 6 in) gauge railways.

Yokkaichi Asunarou Railway took control of the lines and commenced operation on April 1, 2015; previously, the lines were operated by Kintetsu Railway, a private railway operator in the area, as branches of the Kintetsu Nagoya Line.

The company's name, which in Japanese means "let's reach tomorrow", was chosen to represent "hope for the future" and the concept of "facing tomorrow" in regards to the goal of preserving the rare narrow gauge railway lines.

== Lines and services ==
Line	Termini	Stations	Length
Utsube Line	Asunarou Yokkaichi – Utsube	8	5.7 km
Hachiōji Line	Hinaga – Nishihino	2	1.3 km

Past Hinaga, Hachiōji Line services continue on the Utsube Line to/from Asunarou Yokkaichi Station.

Trains departing Asunarou Yokkaichi Station alternate between services to Utsube and Nishihino. Both destinations are serviced every 30 minutes, providing a service every 15 minutes between Asunarou Yokkaichi and Hinaga. A small number of additional services operate in the morning peak.

== Rolling stock ==
All trains operated are 260 series EMUs in either 2-car or 3-car configurations.

At the start of operation, Kintetsu 260 series trains were transferred from Kintetsu Railway. A four-year renewal of all trains was commenced, with some older carriages being replaced with newly built carriages and all others receiving a major refurbishment including the installation of air conditioning.

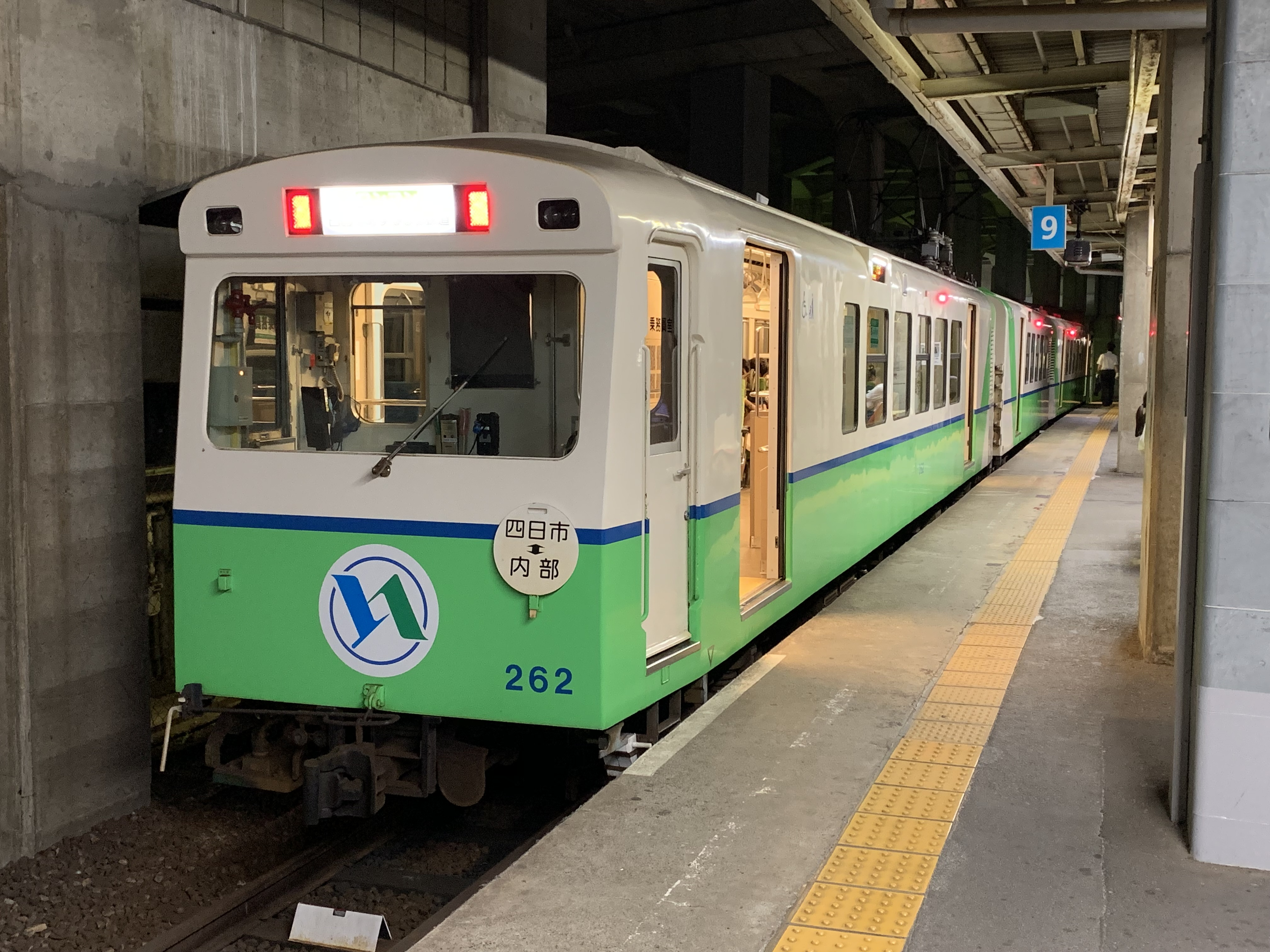
260 series train in "Narou Green" livery

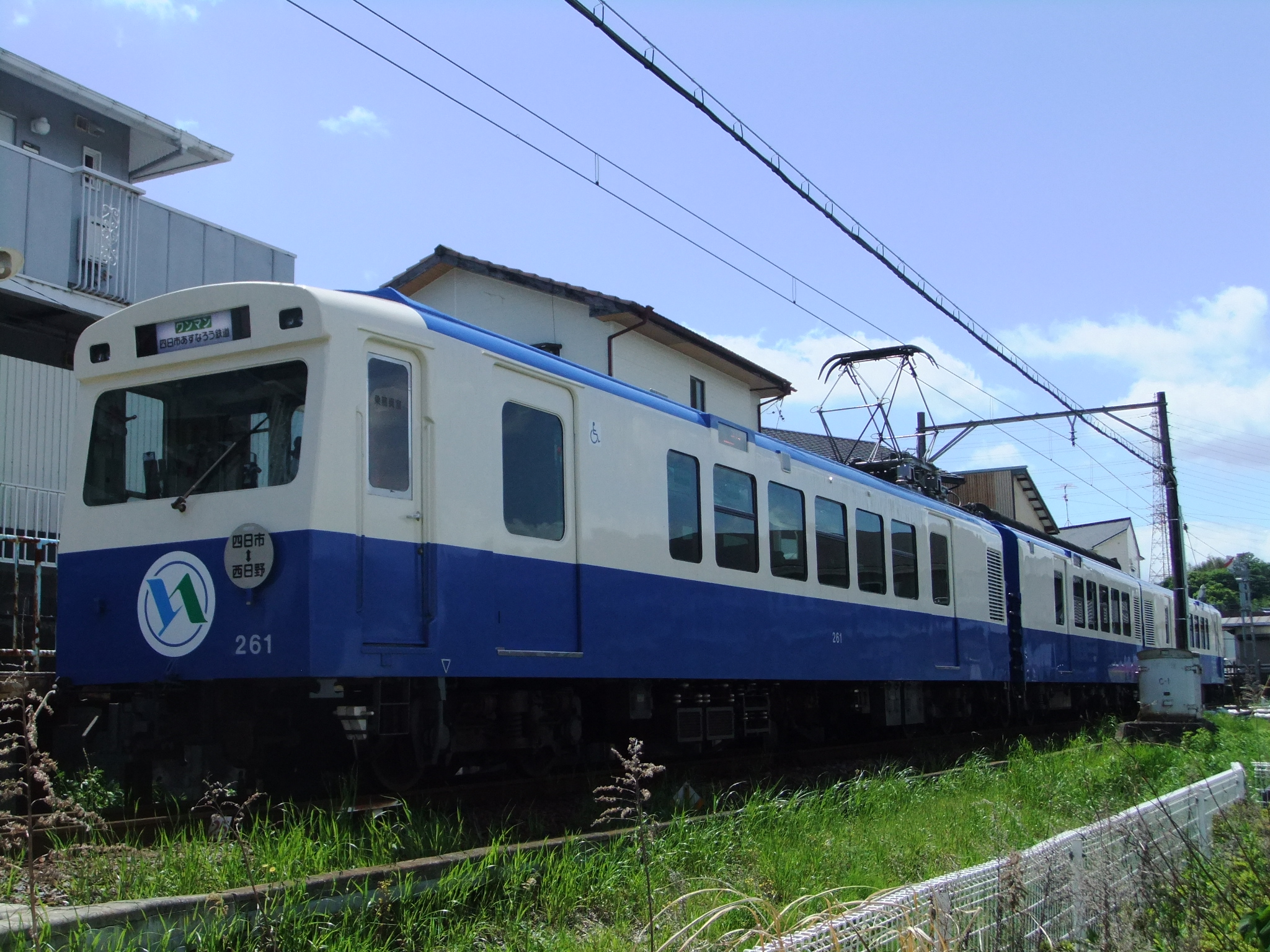
260 series train in "Narou Blue" livery

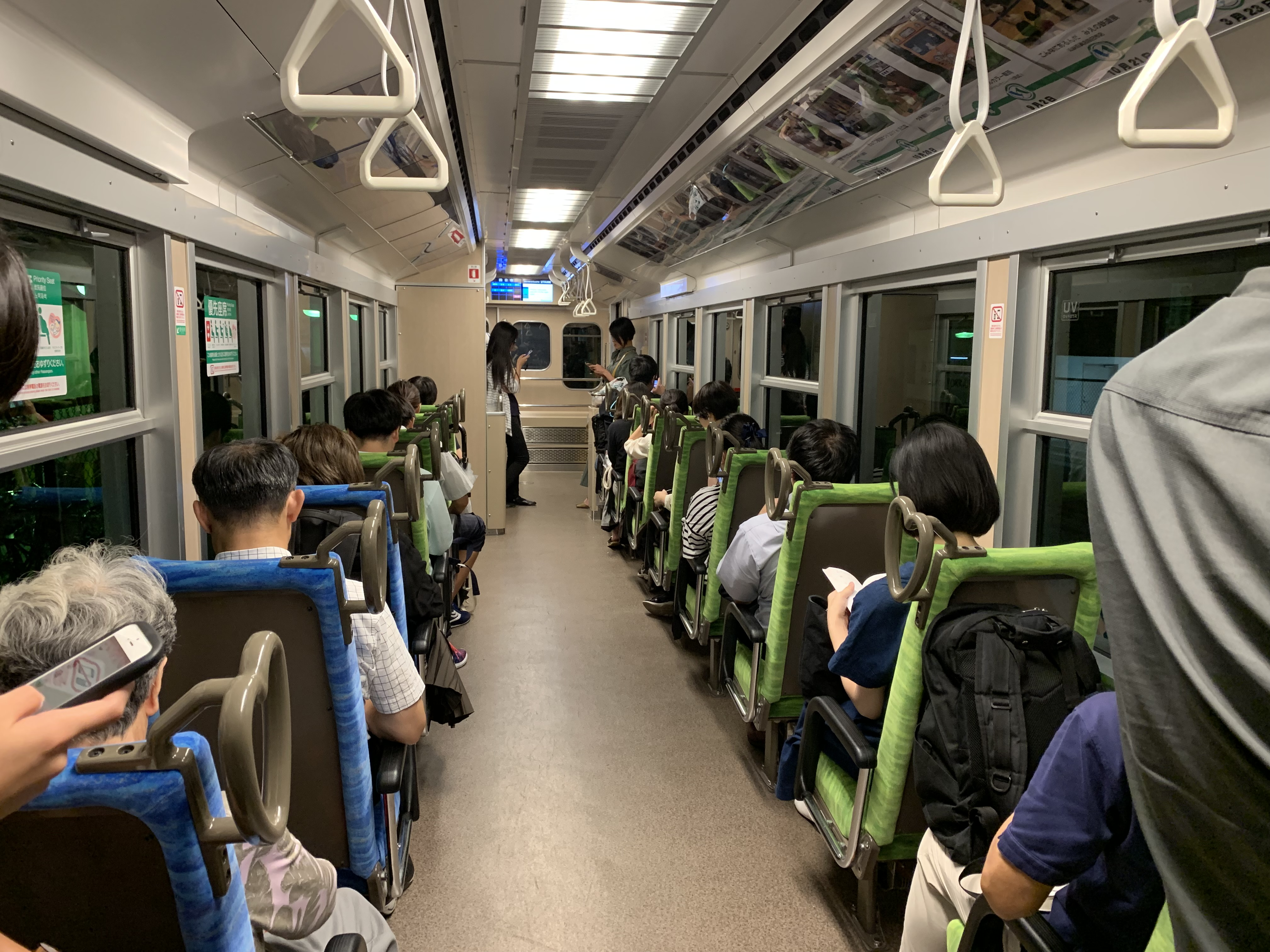
260 series with 1+1 seating and heart-shaped hand-holds

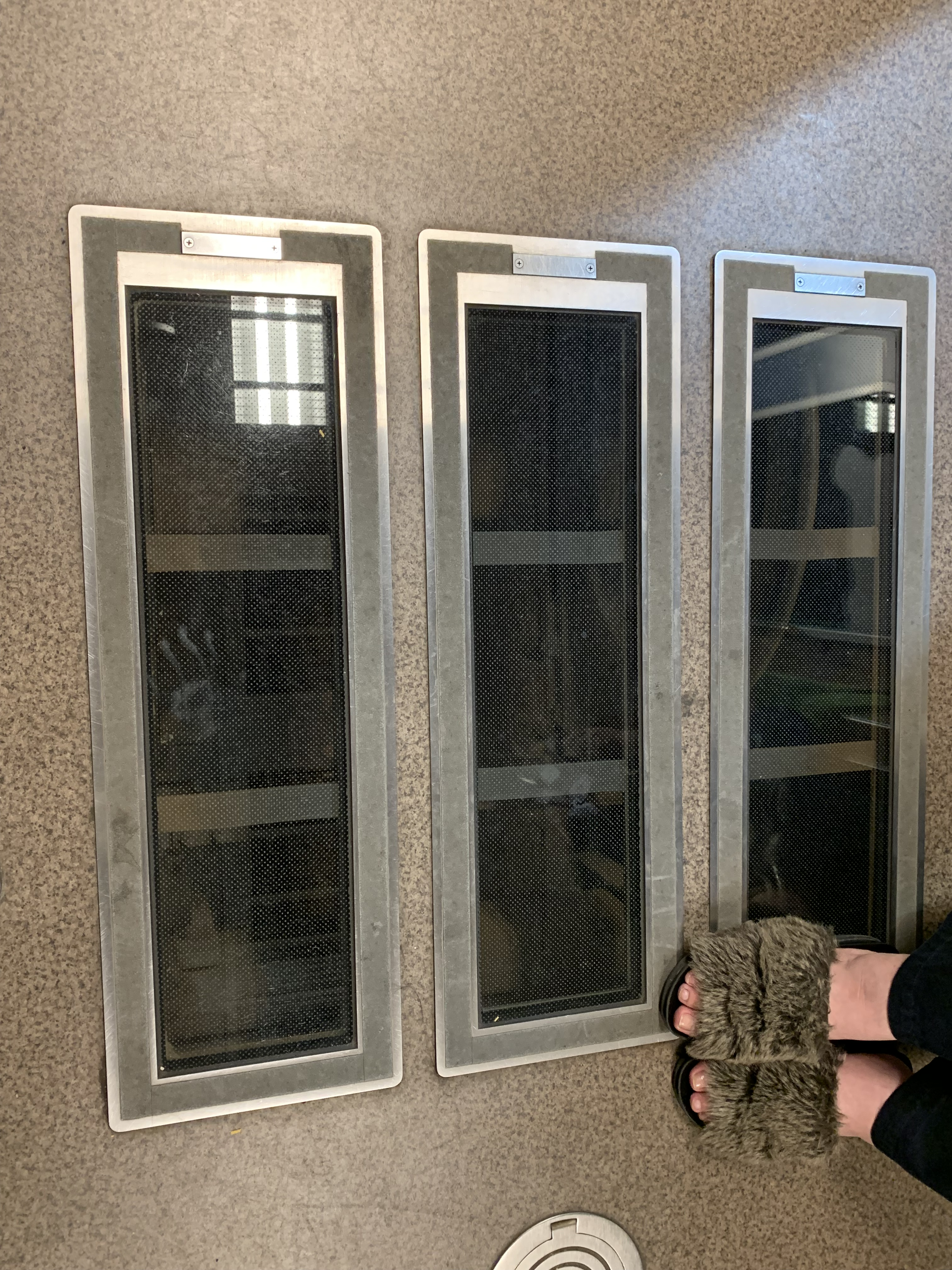
Some 260 series trains feature a see-through floor
