= Utsube Station =

Railway station in Yokkaichi, Mie Prefecture, Japan

Coordinates: 34.9254°N 136.5867°E

Utsube Station 内部駅
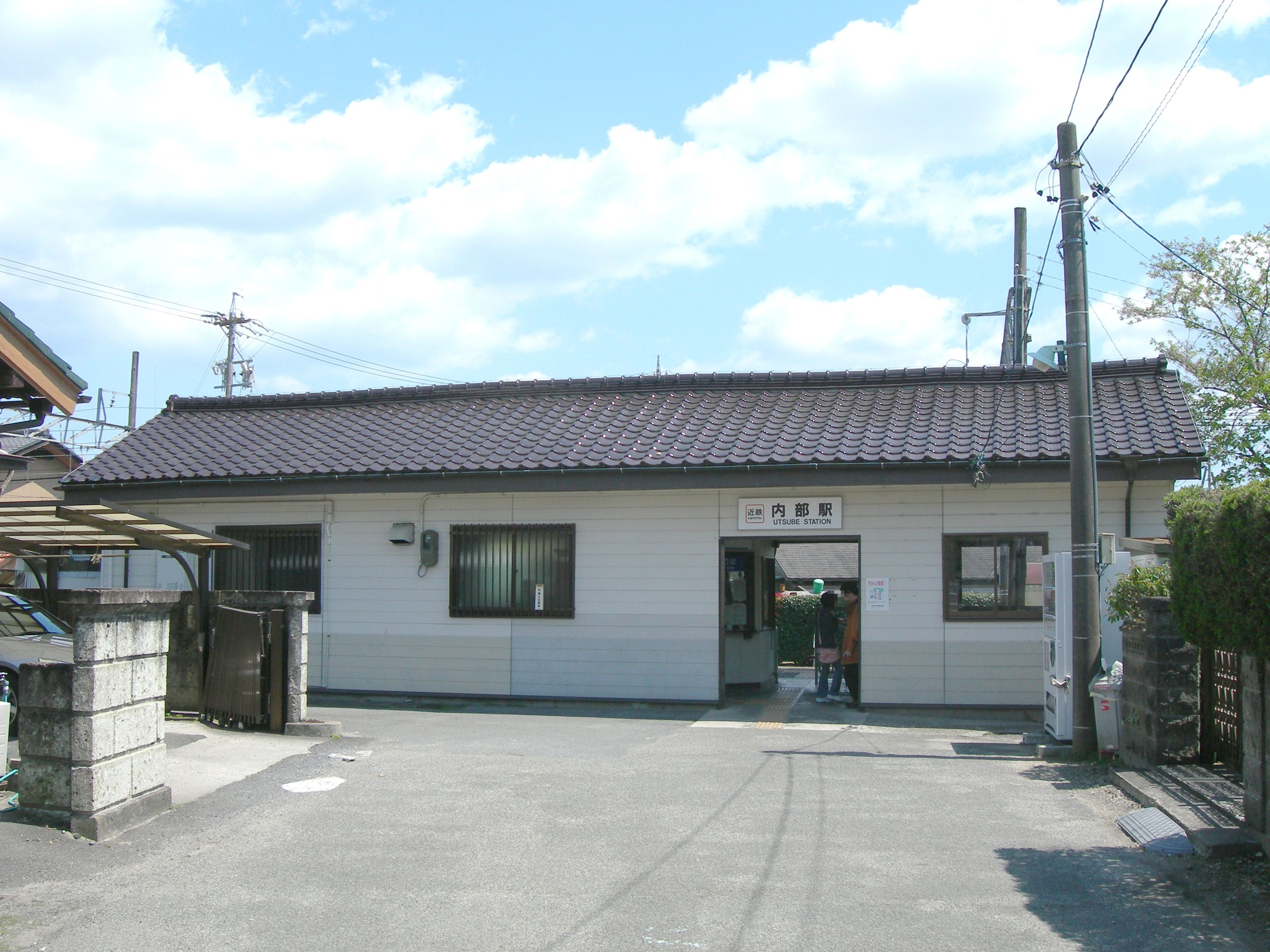
- Utsube Station

General information
- Location: 5-29 Ogoso 3-chome, Yokkaichi, Mie （三重県四日市市小古曽三丁目5-29） Japan
- Operator: Yokkaichi Asunarou Railway
- Line: Utsube Line

History
- Opened: June 22, 1922

Passengers
- FY2011: 828 daily
Location

Utsube Station (内部駅, Utsube-eki) is a terminal railway station on the Yokkaichi Asunarou Railway Utsube Line in Yokkaichi, Mie Prefecture, Japan, operated by the private railway operator Yokkaichi Asunarou Railway. It is 5.7 rail kilometers from the opposing terminus of the line at Asunarou Yokkaichi Station.

== Lines ==
- Utsube Line

== Layout ==
Utsube Station has a side platform. Trains arriving at Utsube Station reverse course back for Asunarou Yokkaichi Station.

=== Platforms ===
1	■ Yokkaichi Asunarou Railway Utsube Line	For Asunarou Yokkaichi

== Adjacent stations ==
«	Service	»
Yokkaichi Asunarou Railway Utsube Line
Ogoso	Local	Terminus

== History ==
Utsube Station was opened on June 22, 1922 as a station on the Mie Railway. On February 11, 1944, due to mergers, station falls under the ownership of Sanco. On February 1, 1964 the Railway division of Sanco splits off and forms separate company, the Mie Electric Railway, which merged with Kintetsu on April 1, 1965. Yokkaichi Asunarou Railway took over the control of the lines and started the operation on April 1, 2015. Until the day before, the lines were operated by Kintetsu Railway, a major private railway operator, as branches of the Kintetsu Nagoya Line.
