= Kintetsu Yokkaichi Station =

Railway station in Yokkaichi, Mie Prefecture, Japan

Kintetsu-Yokkaichi Station 近鉄四日市駅
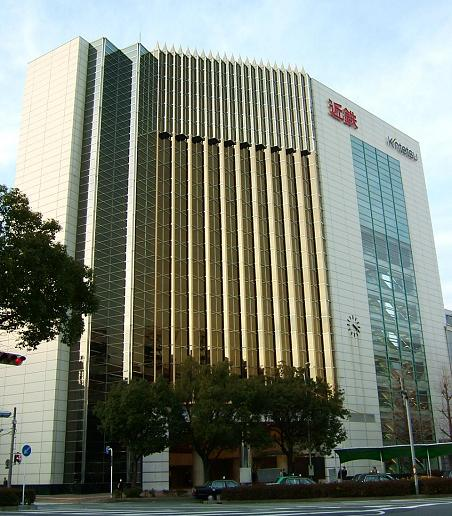

General information
- Location: 1-56, Yasujima Itchome, Yokkaichi-shi, Mie-ken 510-0086; Japan
- Coordinates: 34°58′1.2″N 136°37′7.25″E
- Operator: Kintetsu Railway; Yokkaichi Asunarou Railway
- Lines: Nagoya Line; Yunoyama Line; Utsube Line
- Platforms: 4 island platforms
- Connections: Bus terminal

Other information
- Station code: E21, K21

History
- Opened: September 24, 1913
- Former names: Suwa; Kinki Nippon Yokkaichi (until 1970)

Passengers
- FY 2019 (boarding only): 24,163 (Kintetsu), 6198 (Asunarou Railway)
Location
- Location within Mie Prefecture Location within Japan

Track layout

Kintetsu-Yokkaichi Station (近鉄四日市駅, Kintetsu-Yokkaichi-eki) is a railway station located in the city of Yokkaichi, Mie Prefecture, Japan, operated by the private railway operator Kintetsu Railway. The third-sector Yokkaichi Asunarou Railway, which is jointly owned by Kintetsu and the city of Yokkaichi, uses a part of the station as its terminal Asunarou Yokkaichi Station (あすなろう四日市駅, Asunarō Yokkaichi-eki).

== Lines ==
Kintetsu-Yokkaichi Station is served by the Nagoya Line, and is located 41.9 rail kilometers from the starting point of the line at Ise-Nakagawa Station. It is also a terminus for the 15.4 kilometer Kintetsu Yunoyama Line The Yokkaichi Asunarou Railway Utsube Line terminates at this station.

== Station layout ==
Kintetsu-Yokkaichi Station consists of three island platforms serving six tracks on the third level of a station building. The Asunarou Yokkaichi Station consists of a single island platform on the ground level of the same building.

1, 2	■ Nagoya Line	for Tsu, Toba, Kashikojima, Ōsaka, and Kōbe
3, 4	■ Nagoya Line	for Kuwana and Nagoya
4	■ Nagoya Line	for Ise-Nakagawa
5	■ Yunoyama Line	for Yunoyama-Onsen
5	■ Nagoya Line	for Tsu-shimmachi
6	■ Yunoyama Line	for Yunoyama-Onsen

9	■ Utsube Line	for Utsube (part of trains depart for Nishihino)
10	■ Hachioji Line	for Nishihino (part of trains depart for Utsube)

== Adjacent stations ==
«	Service	»
Kintetsu
Nagoya Line
Kawaramachi	Local	Shinshō
Kawaramachi	Semi-Express	Terminus
Kintetsu-Tomida	Express	Shiohama
Kuwana	Limited Express	Shiroko
Kintetsu-Nagoya	Limited Express "Shimakaze"	Iseshi
Yunoyama Line
Terminus	Local	Nakagawara
Yokkaichi Asunarou Railway
Utsube Line
Terminus	-	Akahori

== History ==
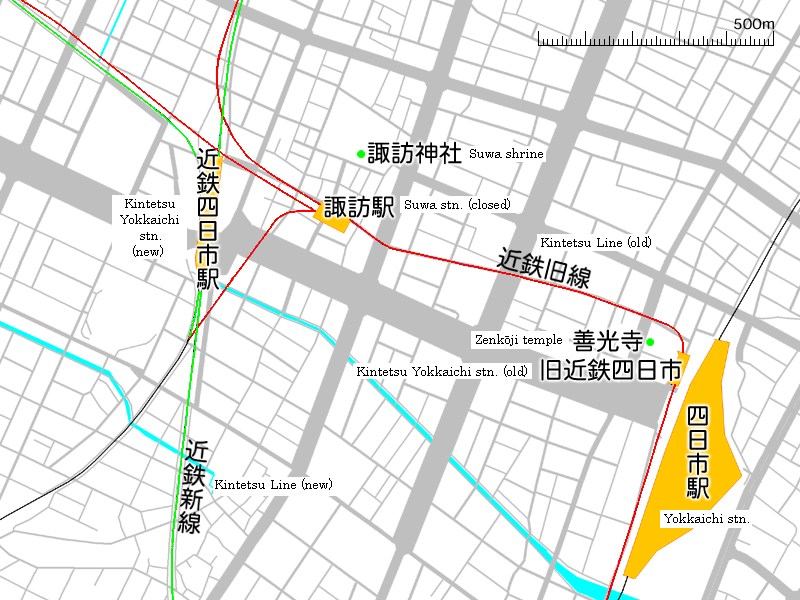
Change of Kintetsu lines near Yokkaichi in 1956

The station was originally opened as Suwa Station (諏訪駅, Suwa-eki) and was a junction of the three lines which Kintetsu-Yokkaichi Station presently serves (the two branch lines were operated by Mie Transport). In 1956 when Kinki Nippon Railway (Kintetsu) rerouted the Nagoya Line and closed its station by JNR's Yokkaichi Station, Suwa Station of Kintetsu and Mie Transport was moved and renamed as Kinki Nippon Yokkaichi Station. The station was again renamed in 1970 to the present name.

- 1913-05-16 Mie tramway Suwa - Minami-Hamada opened.
- 1913-09-24 Yokkaichi Railway Suwa - Ise-Kawashima opened.
- 1915-12-25 Mie tramway Yokkaichi - Suwa opened.
- 1916-03-03 Yokkaichi Railway Yokkaichi - Suwa opened.
- 1916-07-19 Mie tramway was inherited by Mie Railway.
- 1922-03-01 Ise Railway Miyamado - Shin-Yokkaichi open.
- 1929-01-30 Ise Electric Railway Kuwana - Yokkaichi and Suwa stn. opened.
- 1931-03-01 Yokkaichi Railway and Mie Railway merged to Mie Railway.
- 1936-09-15 Sangu Express Railway merged Ise Electric railway.
- 1941-03-15 Osaka Electric Tramway merged Sangu Express Railway and Osaka Electric Tramway was changed to Kansai Express Railway.
- 1944-02-11 Mie railway and other 6 companies merged to Mie Transport.
- 1944-06-01 Kansai Express Railway was changed to Kinki Nippon Railway (Kintetsu).
- 1956-09-23 Kintetsu Line moved to new line. Yokkaichi Station of Kintetsu near JNR Yokkaichi Station was closed. Suwa Station was moved and its name was changed to Kinki Nippon Yokkaichi.
- 1964-02-01 Mie Transport transferred its railway business to Mie Electric Railway.
- 1965-04-01 Kinki Nippon Railway merged Mie Electric Railway.
- 1970-03-01 Kinki Nippon Yokkaichi was changed to Kintetsu Yokkaichi.
- 1973 Nagoya Line and Yunoyama Line were elevated.
- 1974-06-29 Utsube Line Yokkaichi Station was moved.

== Passenger statistics ==
In fiscal 2019, the Kintetsu station was used by an average of 24,163 passengers daily (boarding passengers only). During the same period, the Yokkaichi Asunarou Railway portion of the station was used by 6198 passengers daily.

== Surrounding area ==
- Kintetsu department store
- Tonarie Yokkaichi (shopping center, formerly LaLa Square Yokkaichi)
- Yokkaichi Dome
- Yokkaichi Museum

== See also ==
- List of railway stations in Japan
