= Mount Gozaisho =

Mountain in Mie Prefecture, Japan

- 御在所岳 • 御在所山
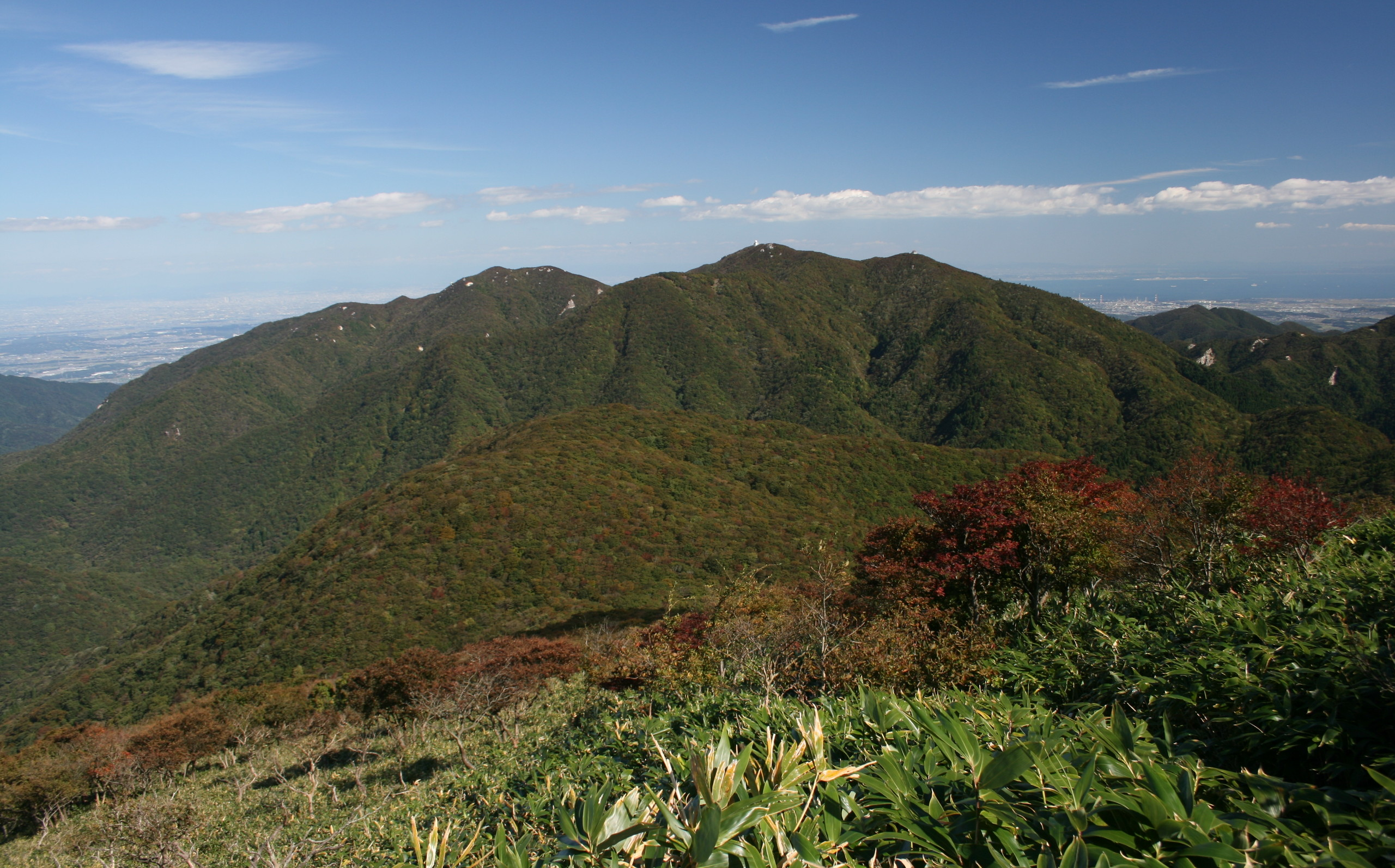
- A view from Mount Amagoi

Highest point
- Elevation: 1,212 m (3,976 ft)
- Listing: Mountains and hills of Japan
- Coordinates: 35°01′14″N 136°25′04″E

Geography
- Location within Japan
- Location: Honshū, Japan
- Parent range: Suzuka Mountains

Geology
- Mountain type: fault

Mount Gozaisho (御在所岳, Gozaisho-dake) is a Japanese mountain located on the border of Komono, Mie Prefecture and Higashi-Ōmi, Shiga Prefecture.

This mountain is the center of Suzuka Quasi-National Park.

== Outline ==
Mount Gozaisho is one of the highest mountains in the Suzuka Mountain Range between Mie and Shiga. The Gozaisho Ropeway connects the top of the mountain to the Yunoyama Hot Springs. Gozaisho is a gate to the other mountains in the Suzuka range.

== Nature ==
Mount Gozaisho is famous for the sharp outlook of the mountains and rich nature.

== Resort ==
On the top of the mountain, there's a small skiing resort which is the closest such resort to the Nagoya metropolitan area.

== Access ==
- Yunoyama-Onsen Station, terminus of the Kintetsu Yunoyama Line.
- Takehira Pass by car.

== Gallery ==
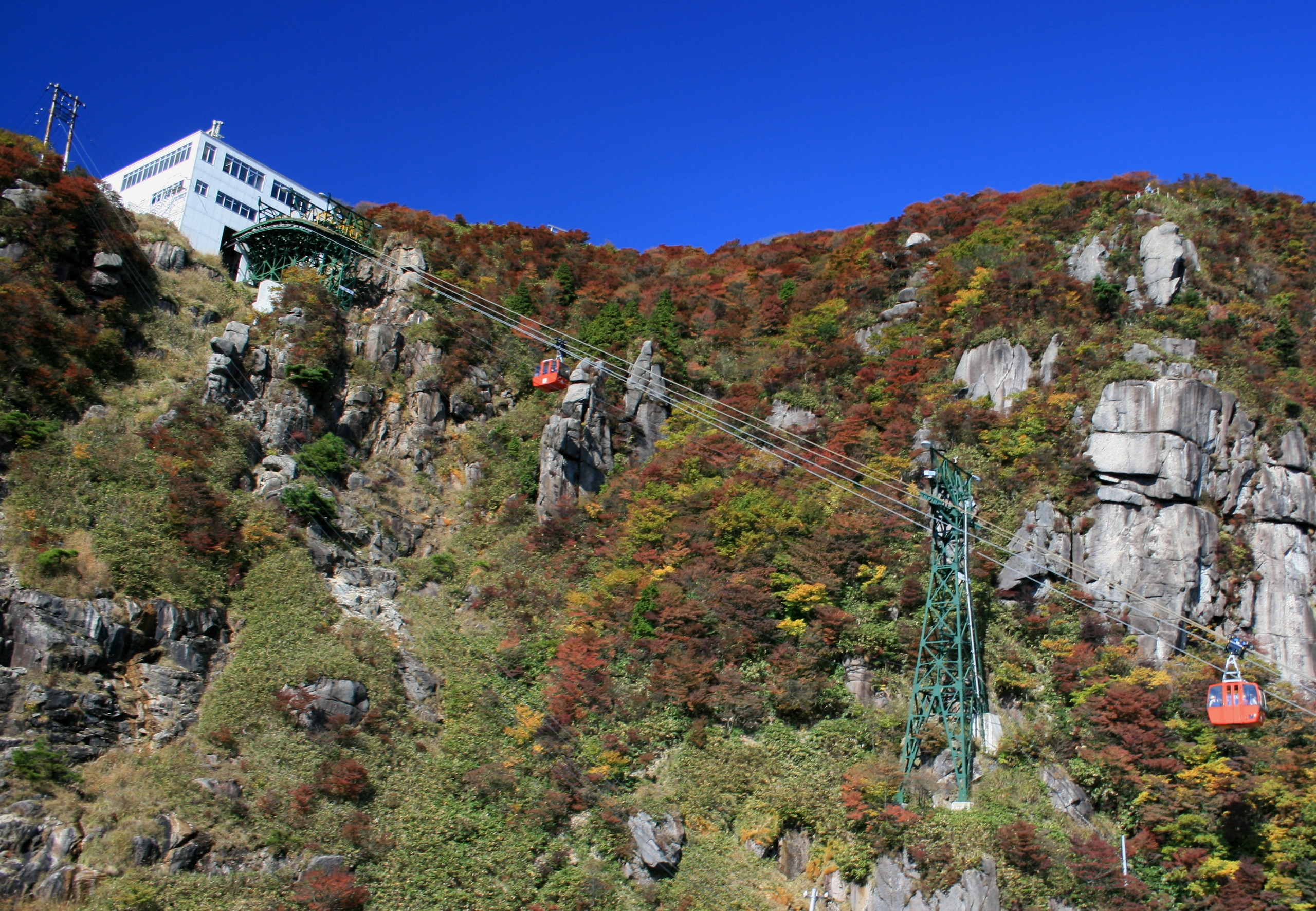
Gozaisho Ropeway from Nakamichi

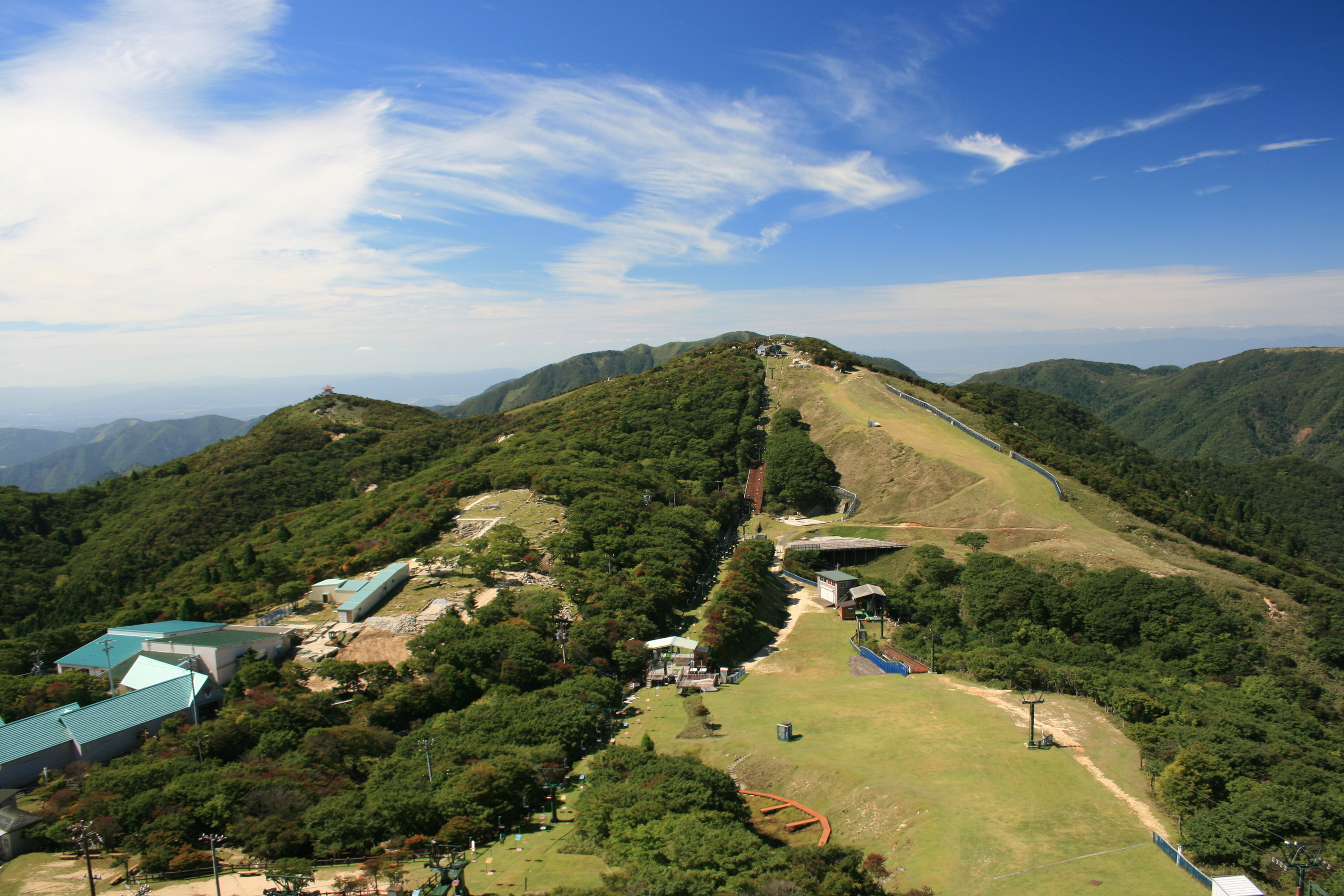
Gozaisho Ski resort

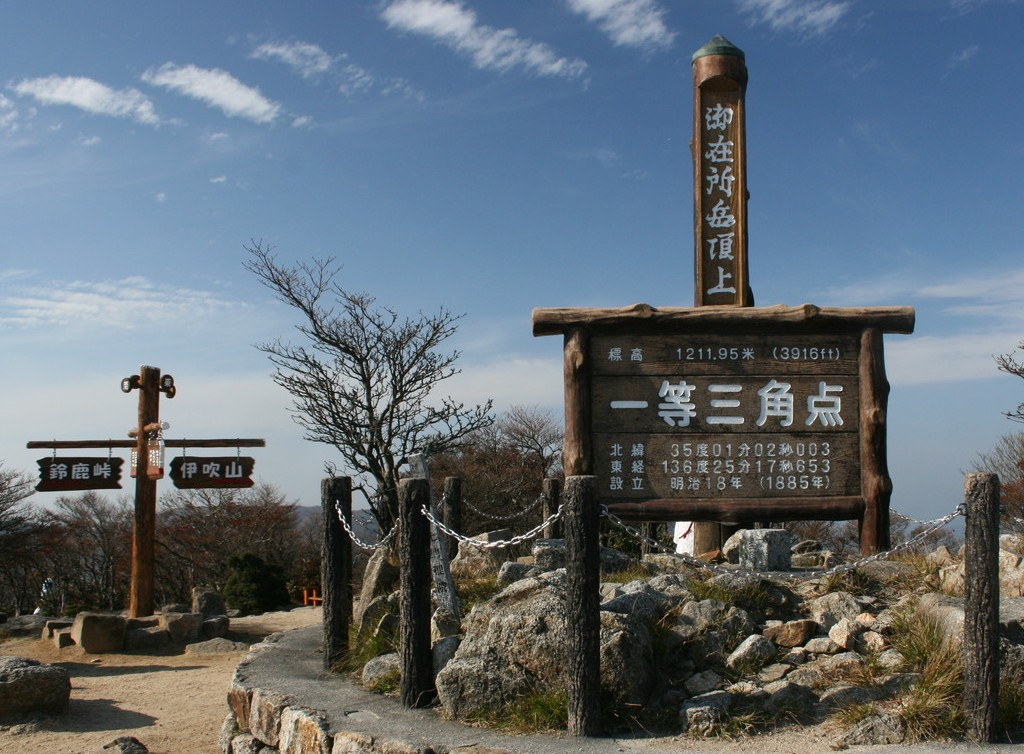
Triangulation station

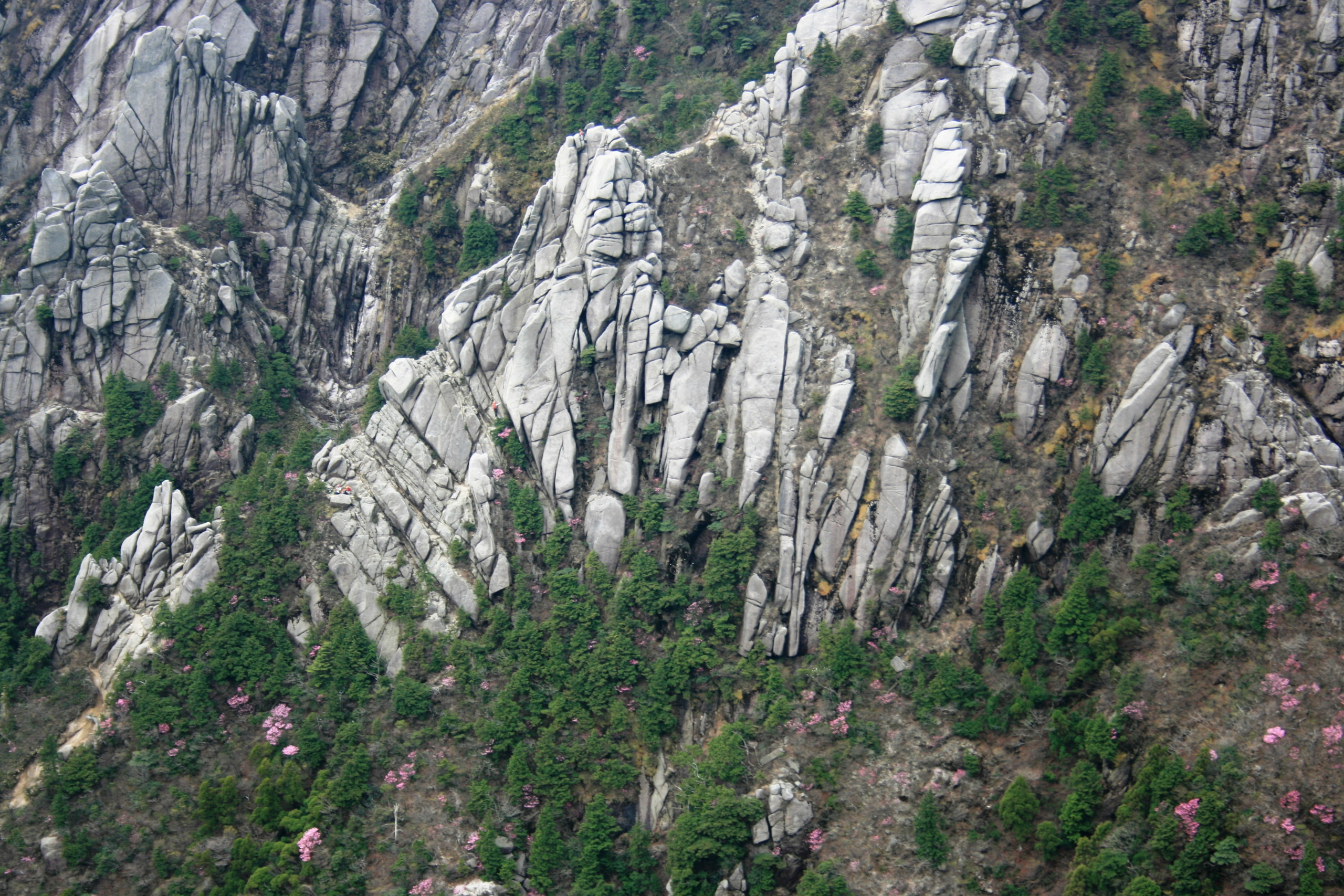
Tonai Wall

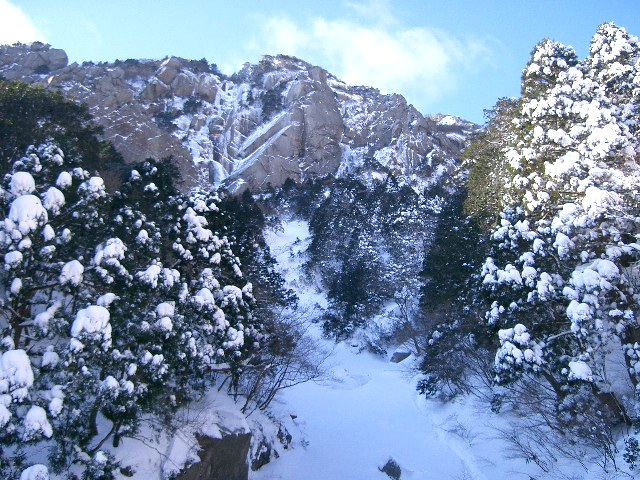
Winter season
