= Yunoyama-Onsen Station =

Railway station in Komono, Mie Prefecture, Japan

Yunoyama-Onsen Station 湯の山温泉駅
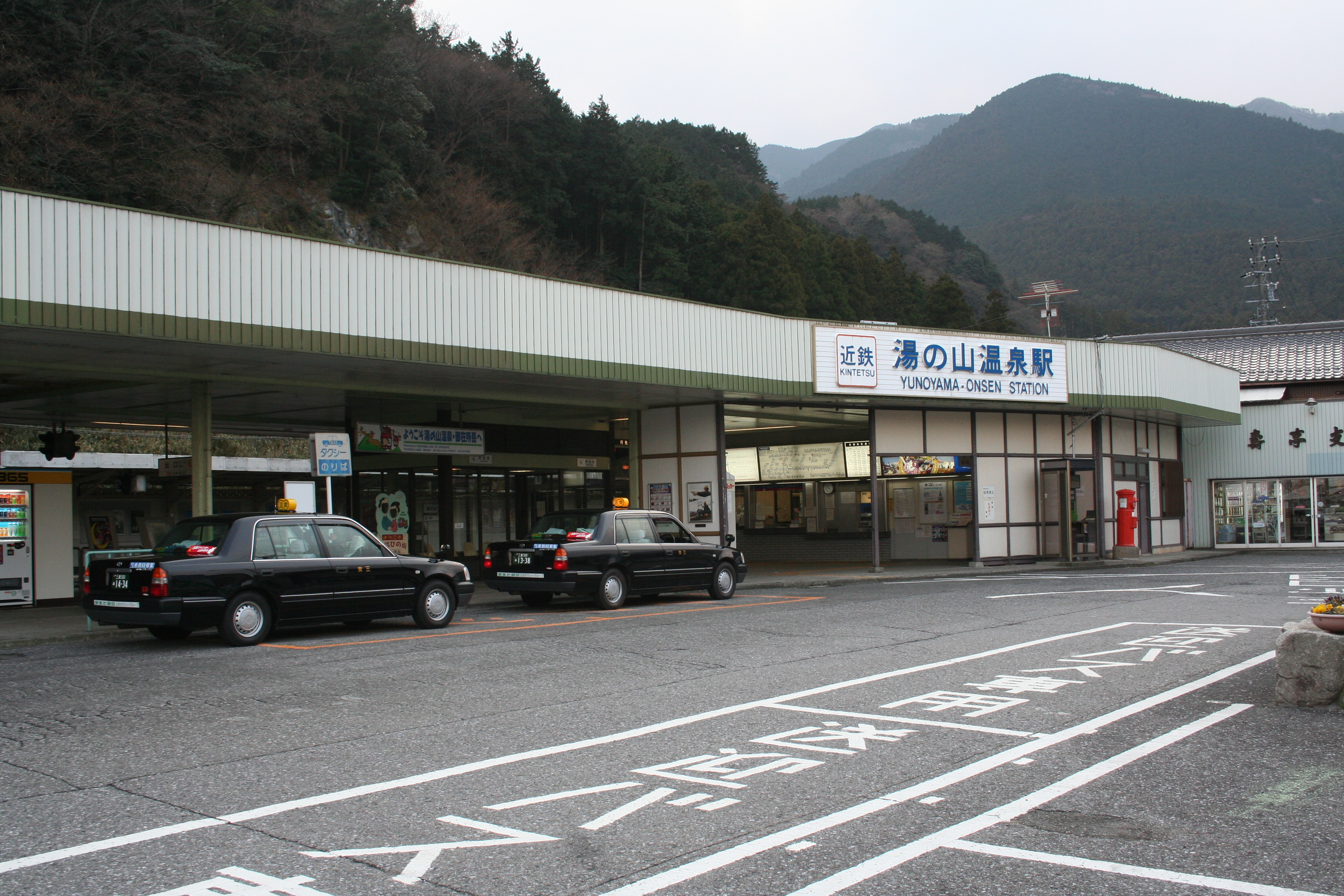
- Yunoyama-Onsen Station

General information
- Location: 4852-2 Komono, Komono-cho, Mie-gun, Mie-ken 510-1233; Japan
- Coordinates: 35°00′42″N 136°28′25″E
- Operator: Kintetsu Railway
- Line: Yunoyama Line
- Distance: 15.4 km from Kintetsu-Yokkaichi
- Platforms: 2 bay platforms

Other information
- Station code: K30
- Website: Official website

History
- Opened: June 1, 1913
- Former names: Yunoyama (until 1970)

Passengers
- FY2019: 258 daily
Location
- Location within Mie Prefecture Location within Japan

Yunoyama-Onsen Station (湯の山温泉駅, Yunoyama-Onsen-eki) is a passenger railway station in located in the town of Komono, Mie Prefecture, Japan, operated by the private railway operator Kintetsu Railway.

== Lines ==
Yunoyama-Onsen Station is a terminal station of the Yunoyama Line, and is located 15.4 rail kilometers from the opposing terminus of the line at Kintetsu-Yokkaichi Station.

== Station layout ==
The station consists of two bay platforms, one of which is only used early in the mornings. There is a Sanco bus station immediately outside the station entrance. This station has a window for buying limited express tickets.

=== Platforms ===
1	■ Yunoyama Line	for Yokkaichi • Nagoya • Osaka Namba • Kashikojima
2	■ Yunoyama Line	for Yokkaichi • Nagoya • Osaka Namba • Kashikojima (early morning only)

== Adjacent stations ==
«	Service	»
Yunoyama Line
Ōbane-en	Local	Terminus

== History ==
- June 1, 1913 - Yokkaichi Railway opens the station as Yunoyama Station (湯ノ山駅, Yunoyama-eki).
- March 1, 1931 - Due to mergers, station falls under the ownership of Mie Railway.
- February 11, 1944 - Due to mergers, station falls under the ownership of Sanco.
- February 1, 1964 - Railway division of Sanco splits off and forms separate company, station falls under the ownership of Mie Electric Railway.
- April 1, 1965 - Due to mergers, stations fall under the ownership of Kintetsu.
- July 15, 1965 - Direct Kintetsu limited express service between both Osaka and Nagoya begins.
- March 1, 1970 - Officially renamed Yunoyama-Onsen Station.
- 1979 - Platforms extended to support 4-car trains.
- March 17, 1998 - Direct service to both Osaka and Nagoya ends.
- March 18, 2004 - Limited express service ends.
- April 1, 2007 - Support for PiTaPa and ICOCA begins.

== Passenger statistics ==
In fiscal 2019, the station was used by an average of 258 passengers daily (boarding passengers only).

== Surrounding area ==
- Yunoyama Onsen
- Mount Gozaisho
- Gozaisho Ropeway

== See also ==
- List of railway stations in Japan
