= Ise Kokubun-ji =

Buddhist temple in Suzuka, Mie, Japan

Isa Kokubun-ji
- 伊勢国分寺 (Japanese)
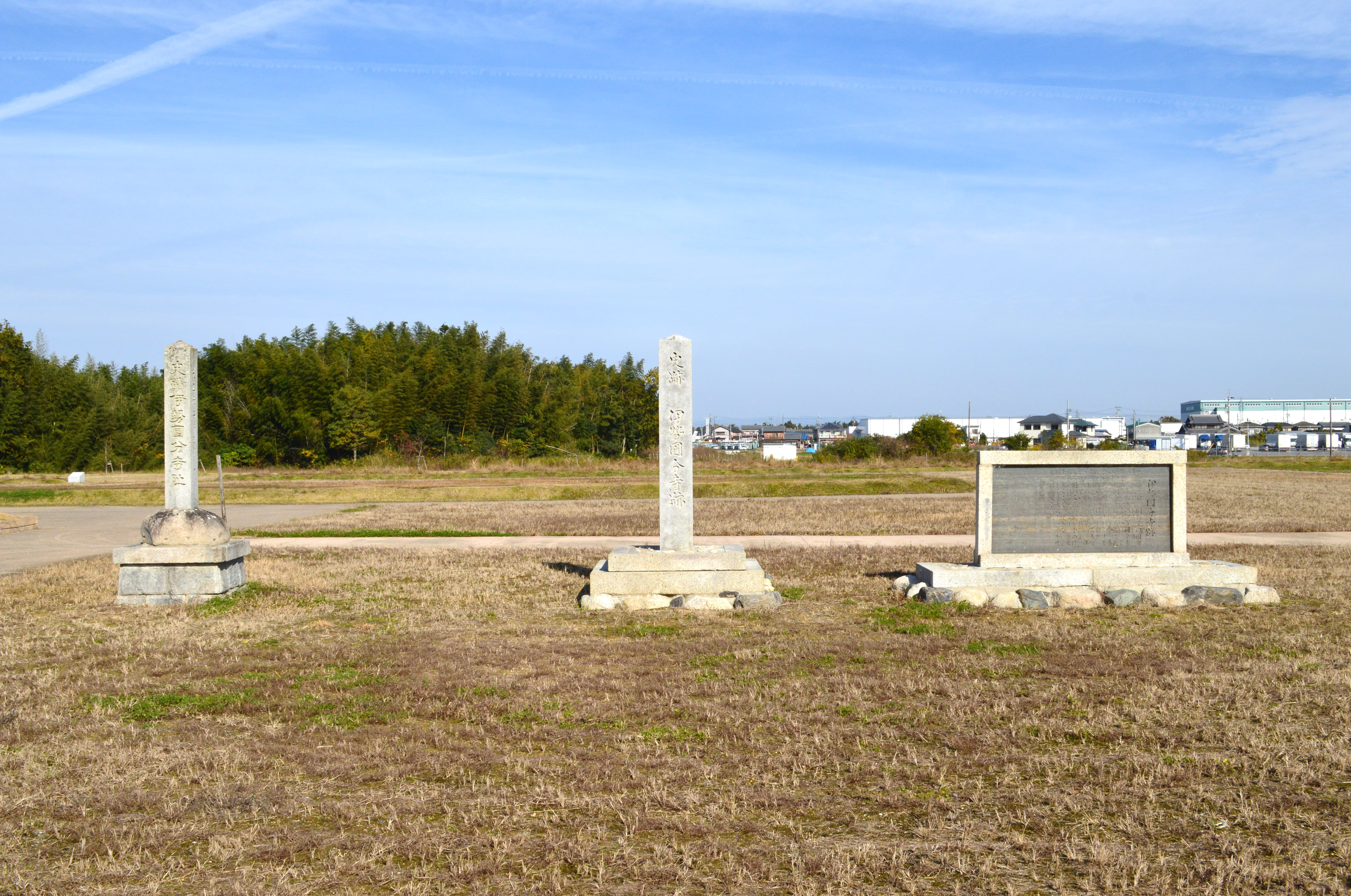
- Isa Kokubun-ji ruins

- Iga Kokubun-ji ruins Ise Kokubun-ji (Japan)
- Interactive map of Isa Kokubun-ji
- 34°54′31.54″N 136°33′49.50″E
- Type: temple ruins
- Periods: Nara - Heian period
- Location: Suzuka, Mie, Japan
- Region: Kansai region

History
- Built: c.8th century AD

Site notes
- Public access: Yes (no public facilities)

The Ise Kokubun-ji (伊勢国分寺) was a Buddhist temple located in the Kokubunchō neighborhood of the city of Suzuka, Mie Prefecture in the Kansai region of Japan. It was the provincial temple ("kokubunji") of former Ise Province. Its location is now an archaeological site, which has been preserved as a National Historic Site since 1922.

== Overview ==
The Shoku Nihongi records that in 741 AD, as the country recovered from a major smallpox epidemic, Emperor Shōmu ordered that a monastery and nunnery be established in every province, the kokubunji (国分寺). These temples were built to a semi-standardized template, and served both to spread Buddhist orthodoxy to the provinces, and to emphasize the power of the Nara period centralized government under the Ritsuryō system.

The Ise Kokubun-ji is located on a fluvial terrace on the north bank of the Suzuka River in northern Mie Prefecture at an elevation of 43 meters. The site is located near the route of the Tōkaidō highway connecting the capital with the eastern provinces of Japan, and near the Ise Kokufu, the provincial capital of Ise Province, the Suzuka Barrier, and there are abundant sites from the Yayoi period and Kofun period in the near vicinity.

The history of this temple is very uncertain. It is believed to have been built in 741 AD, soon after the order to build the kokubunji temples in each province was issued. The area had been dominated by the Oshika clan since the Kofun period and there are many ancient burial mounds in the vicinity. In 809 AD, it was recorded that the priest of the Shima Kokubun-ji was ordered to be transferred to the Ise Kokubun-ji. The temple reappears in the Engishiki records in 927 AD, but it then disappears from the historical record. In 1186, Minamoto no Yoritomo ordered that the shugo in each province on the Tōkaidō repair the kokubunji in their respective territories, but no mention is made in the order of the Ise Kokubun-ji. According to one account, the ruins of the South Gate were still standing until the Sengoku period. Edo Period maps, such as the "Map of Famous Places of the Tokaido" from the Kansei era (1789-1801) give the place name of "kokubunji", but make no mention that a temple existed, and a traveller's account from the Horeki era (1751-1764) mentions that roof tiles could be found scattered in the area.

Although the site was proclaimed a National Historic Site in 1921, the first archaeological excavation did not take place until 1988, and during the interim, traces of an earthen rampart on the west and south edges of the site were destroyed despite their "protected" status. From 1988 to 2009, 35 excavations have been conducted.

The original design of the temple was a walled square area, 180 meters on each a side. The alignment of buildings consisted of a South Gate, Middle Gate, Kondō, Lecture Hall, and monks quarters all arranged in a straight line from south to north, with a cloister connecting the Middle Gate to the sides of the Kondō. This follows the arrangement of Tōdai-ji in Nara, the head temple of the kokubunji system.

However, the Ise Kokubun-ji deviates significantly from this template by having two secondary walled compounds within the main enclosure, to the east of the main buildings. The one to the northeast measures 64 meters east-to-west by 90 meters north-to-south, with a gate to the south, which contained a number of buildings and refuse middens. It is speculated that this was a place where food was prepared and/or was possibly a hospital. The second small compound is 45 meters by 30 meters. There is speculation that this smaller enclosure held the Pagoda, as neither it, nor the Kyōzō or Shōrō have been found, but as the site has not been fully excavated, this remains uncertain.

The Suzuka Municipal Archaeological Museum (鈴鹿市考古博物館) was opened adjacent to the site in 1998. It is about a 15-minute walk from Kawano Station on the JR West Kansai Main Line.

== Gallery ==
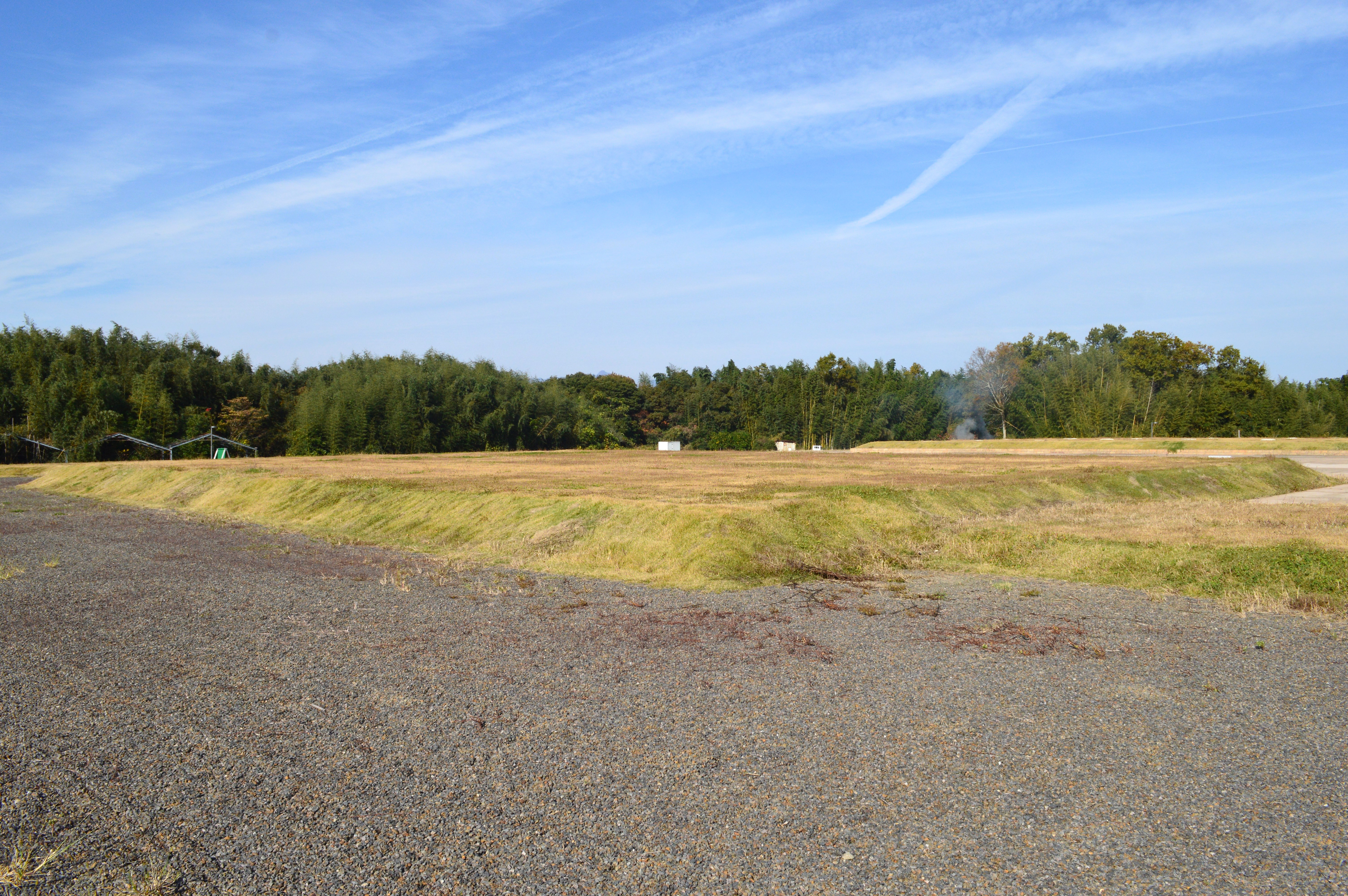
Kondō ruins

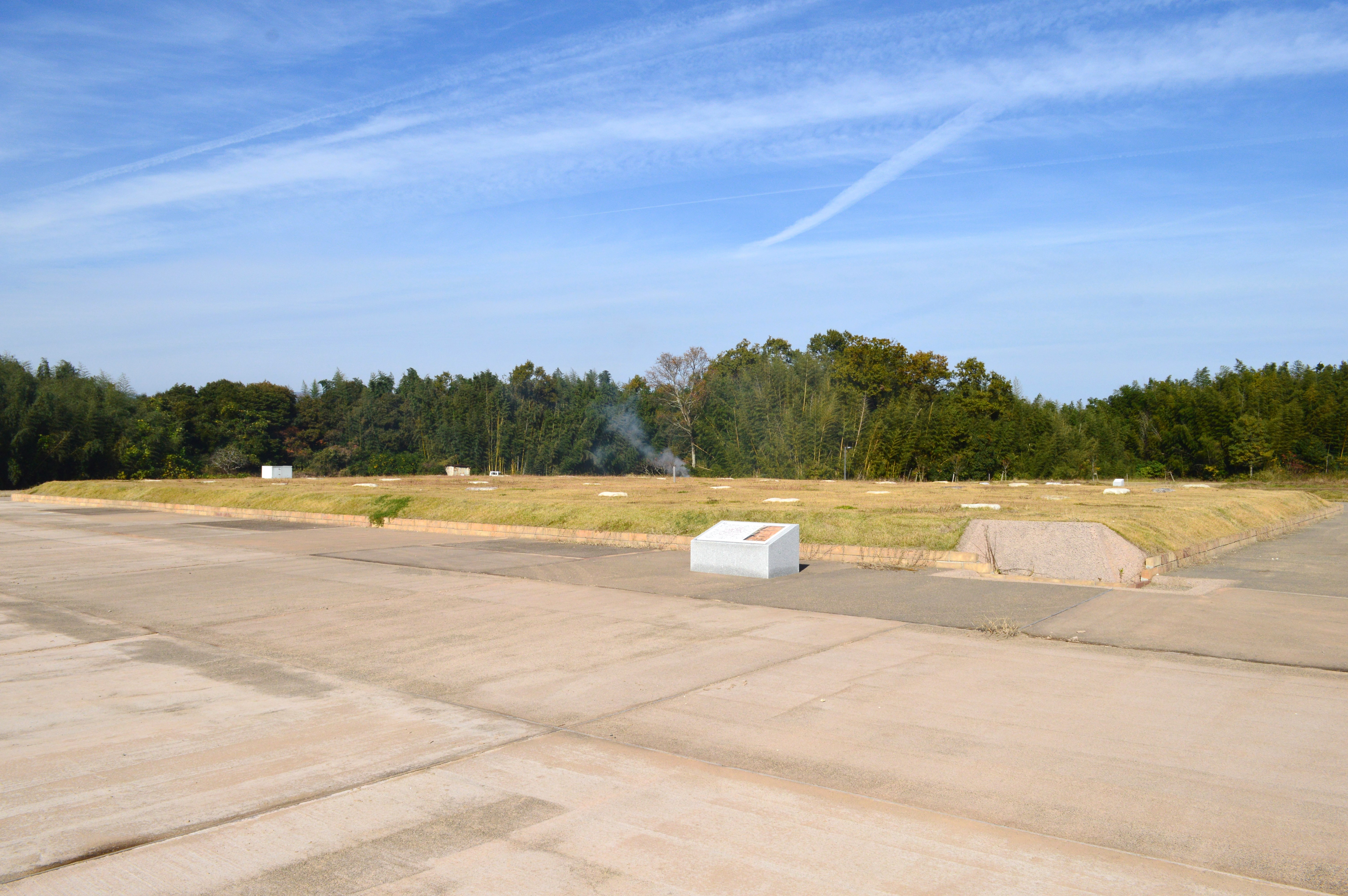
Lecture Hall ruins

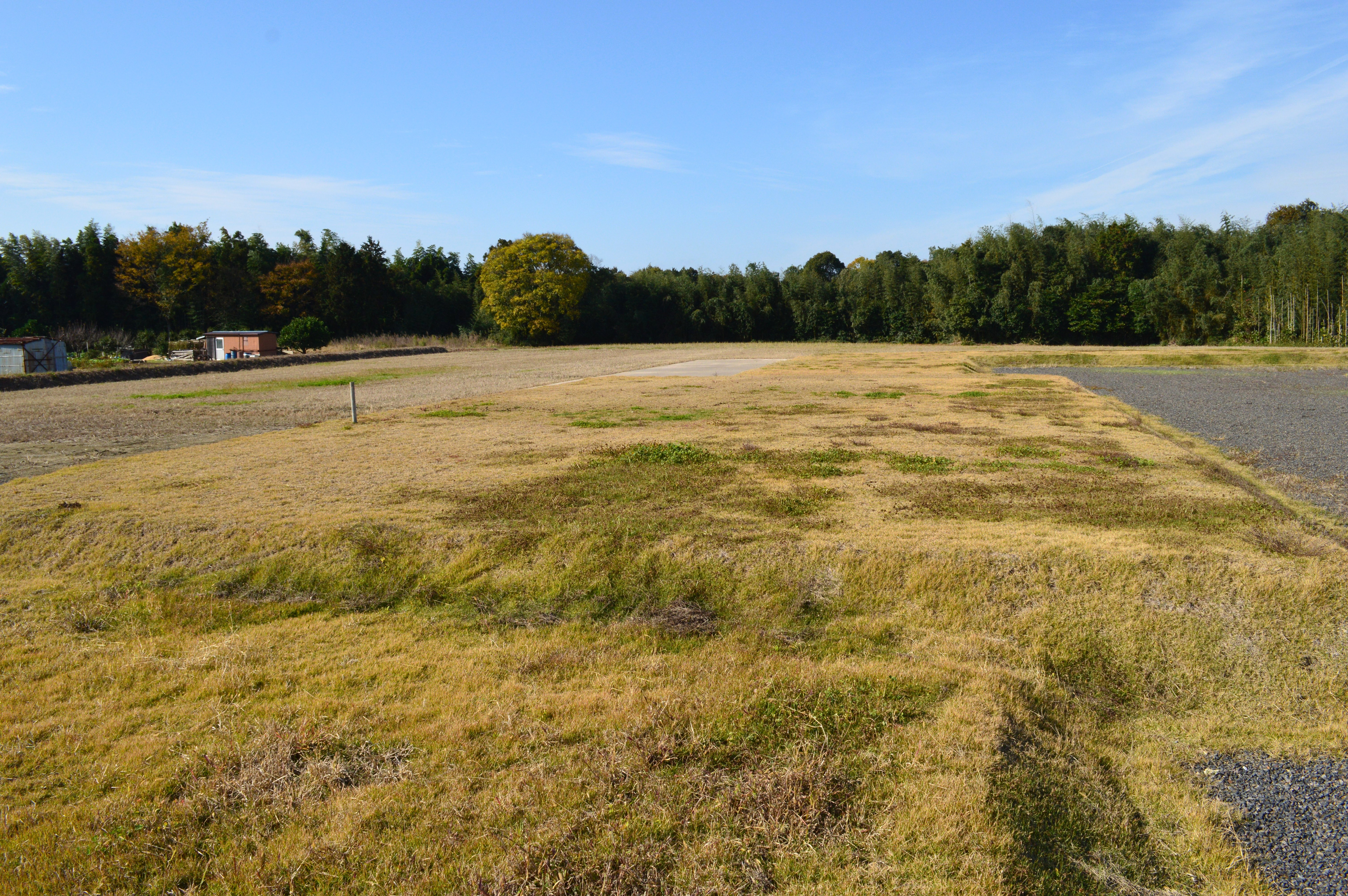
Middle Gate ruins

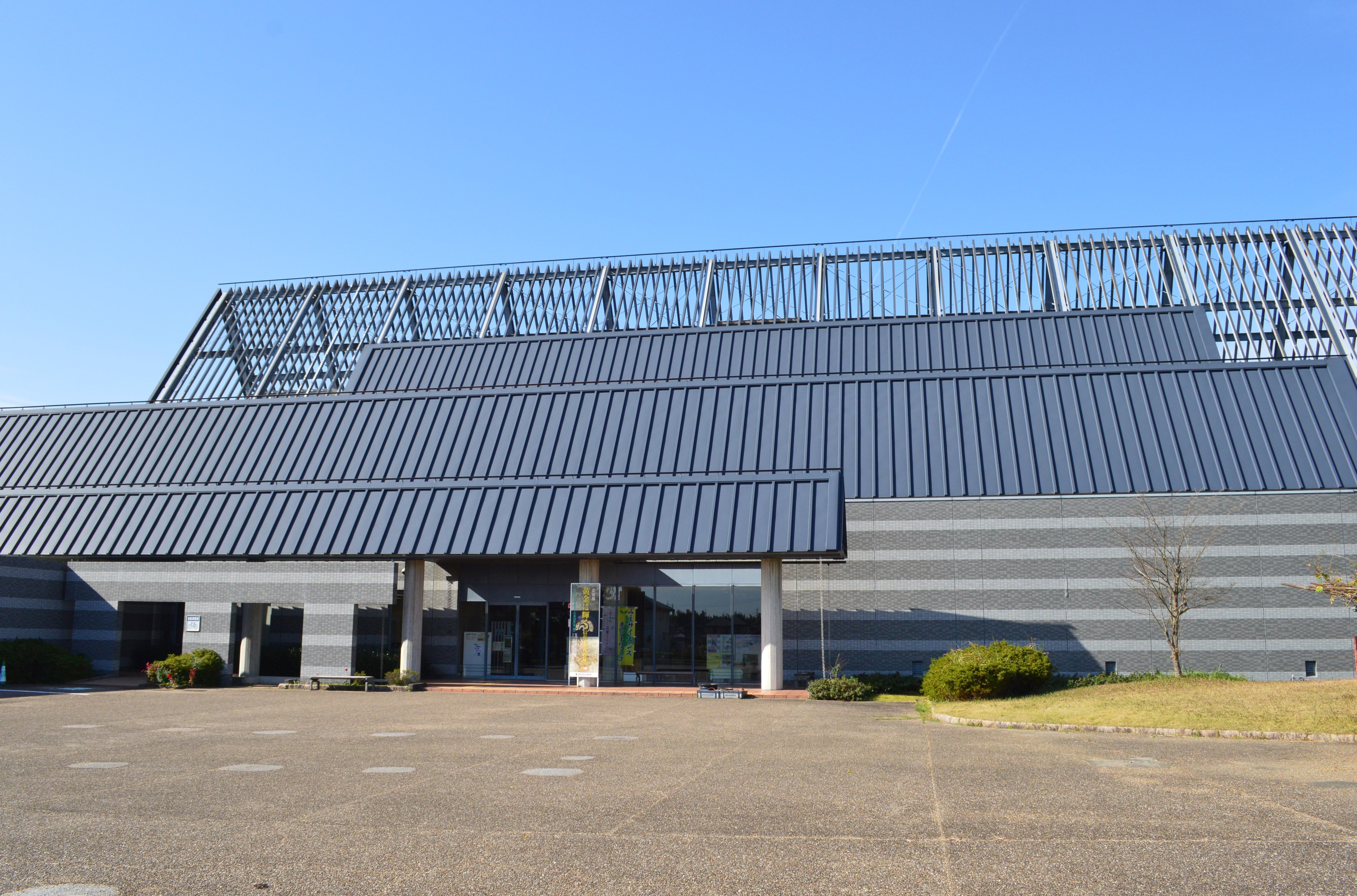
Suzuka Museum of Archaeology

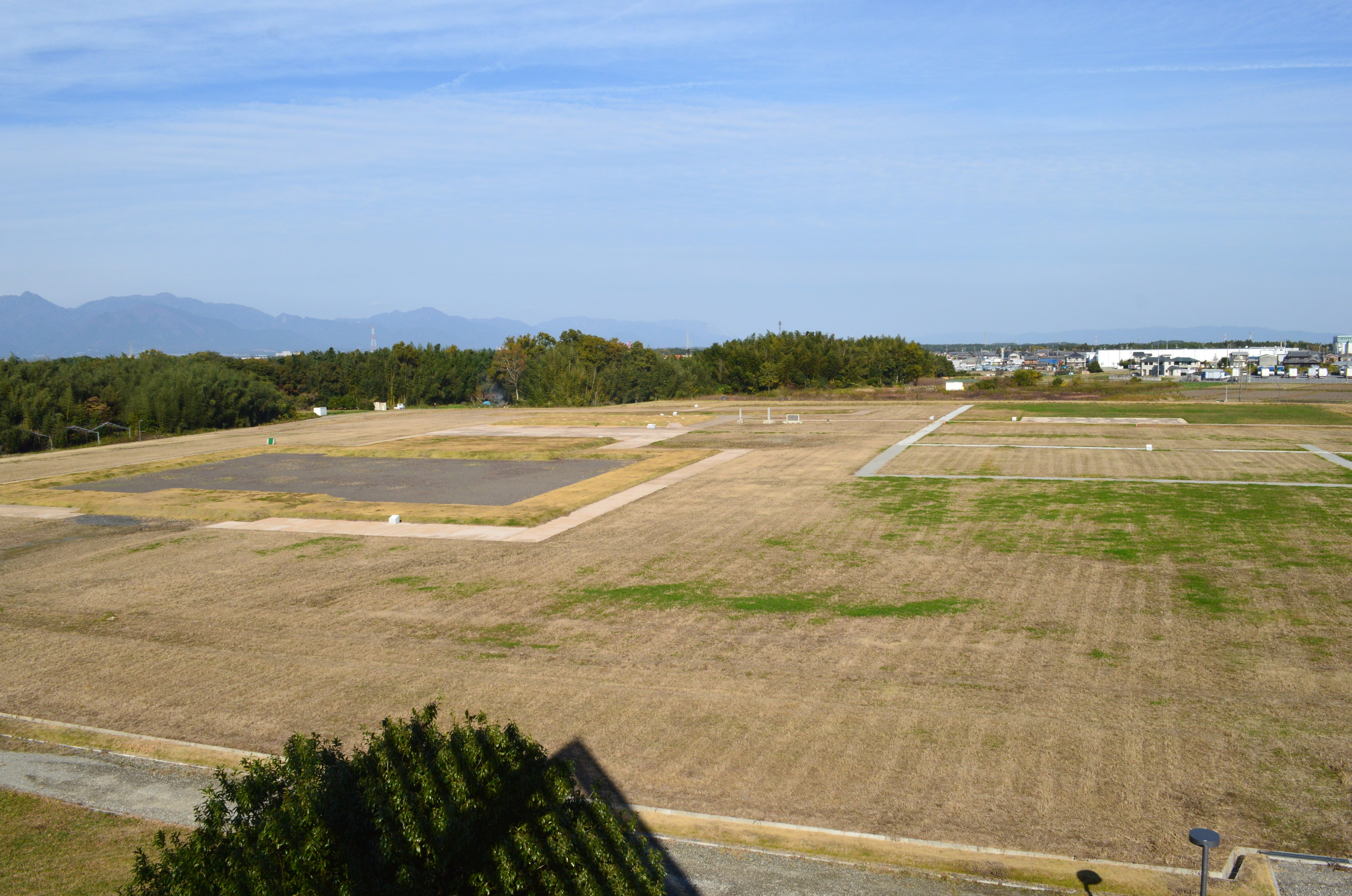
Overview

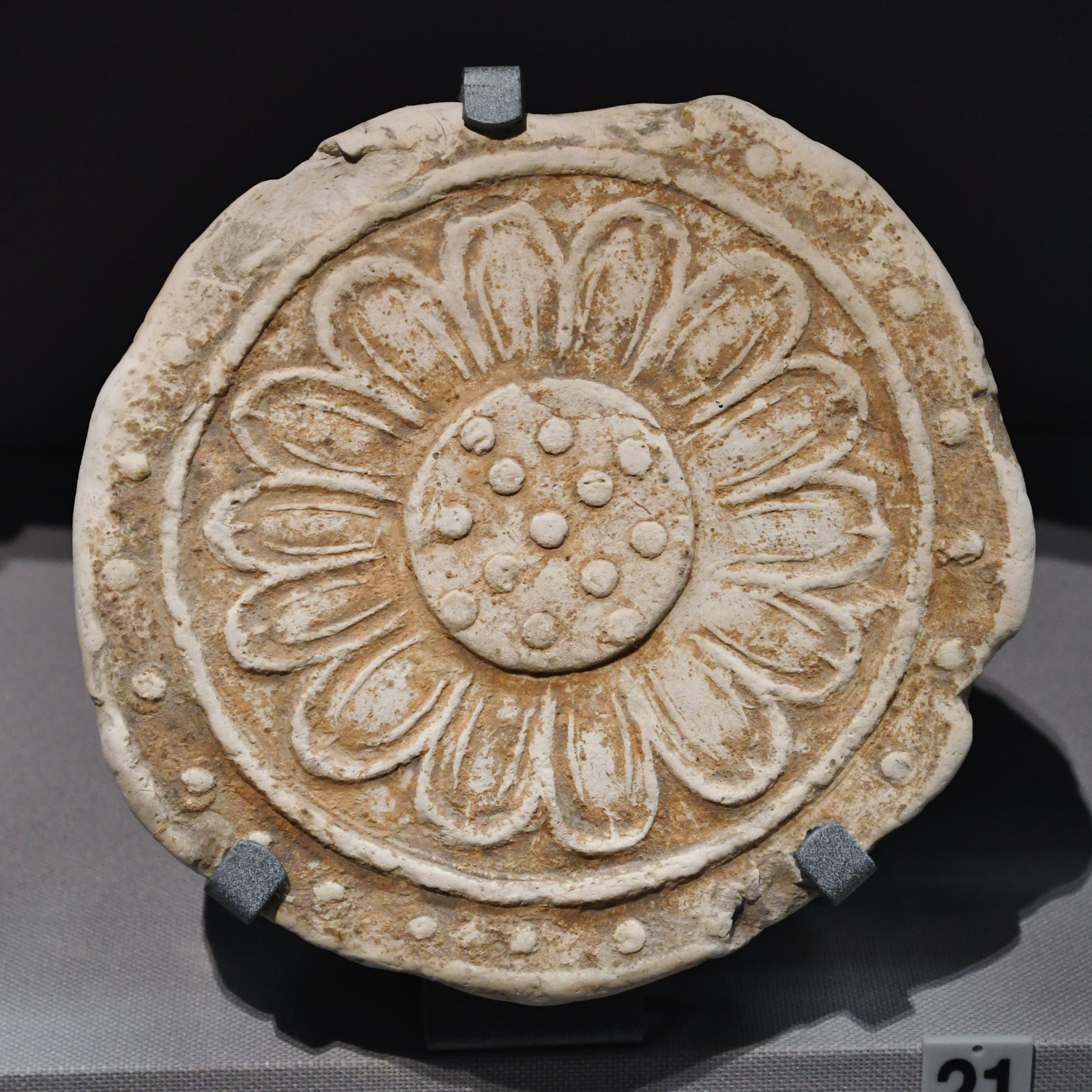
Roof tile from the Ise Kokubun-ji site

== Ise Kokubun-niji ==
The location of the Ise Kokubun-niji, the provincial nunnery associated with the Ise Kokubun-ji is unknown. The "Ise Kokubunji Temple Site Monument" (a monument erected in 1802) at Ise Kokubun-ji site states that the monks' temple was called "Minami-in" and Hokke-ji (the nunnery) was called "Kita-in". Subsequent investigations revealed that the "Minami-in" was the remains of a Hakuho period temple (the Oshika temple ruins), which pre-dates the Ise Kokubun-ji; however, a quantity of Nara period roof tiles were excavated from the "Kita-in" site in 1993 to 1994, and the site is now tentatively considered to be the location of the nunnery. It is a short distance immediately to the east of the Ise Kokubun-ji site.

In addition, the remains of three roof tile kilns from the mid-Nara period (the Kawarai tile kiln ruins) have been discovered in the Kasato-cho neighborhood of Suzuka. These are thought to have been kilns for producing tiles for the Ise Kokubun-ji.

== See also ==
- Provincial temple
- List of Historic Sites of Japan (Mie)
