= Suzuka Mountains =

Mountain range in central Japan

Coordinates: 35°10′45.91″N 136°24′50.93″E

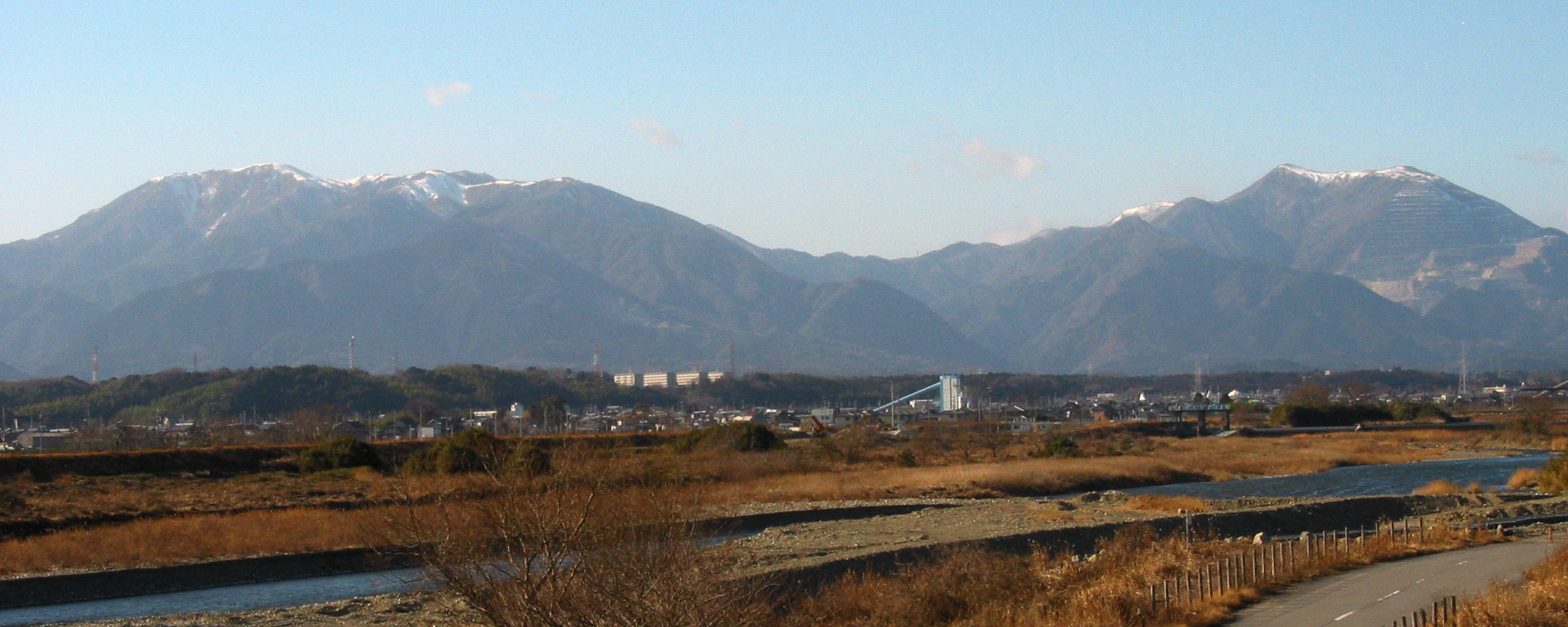
Mount Ryū and Mount Fujiwara

The Suzuka Mountains (鈴鹿山脈, Suzuka Sanmyaku) are a mountain range running through Mie Prefecture and along the borders of Gifu and Shiga prefectures in central Japan. The tallest peak in the range is Mount Oike at 1,247 m (4,091 ft). In spite of its height, Mount Oike is not the most visited mountain; that distinction belongs to Mount Gozaisho because of its Gozaisho Ropeway, making reaching the peak much easier.

Suzuka Quasi-National Park protects a portion of the mountain range from development and has a total area of 298 km^{2} (115 mi^{2}). The town of Komono, Mie Prefecture, has many onsen.

The northern part consists of limestone, and the southern part consists of granite.

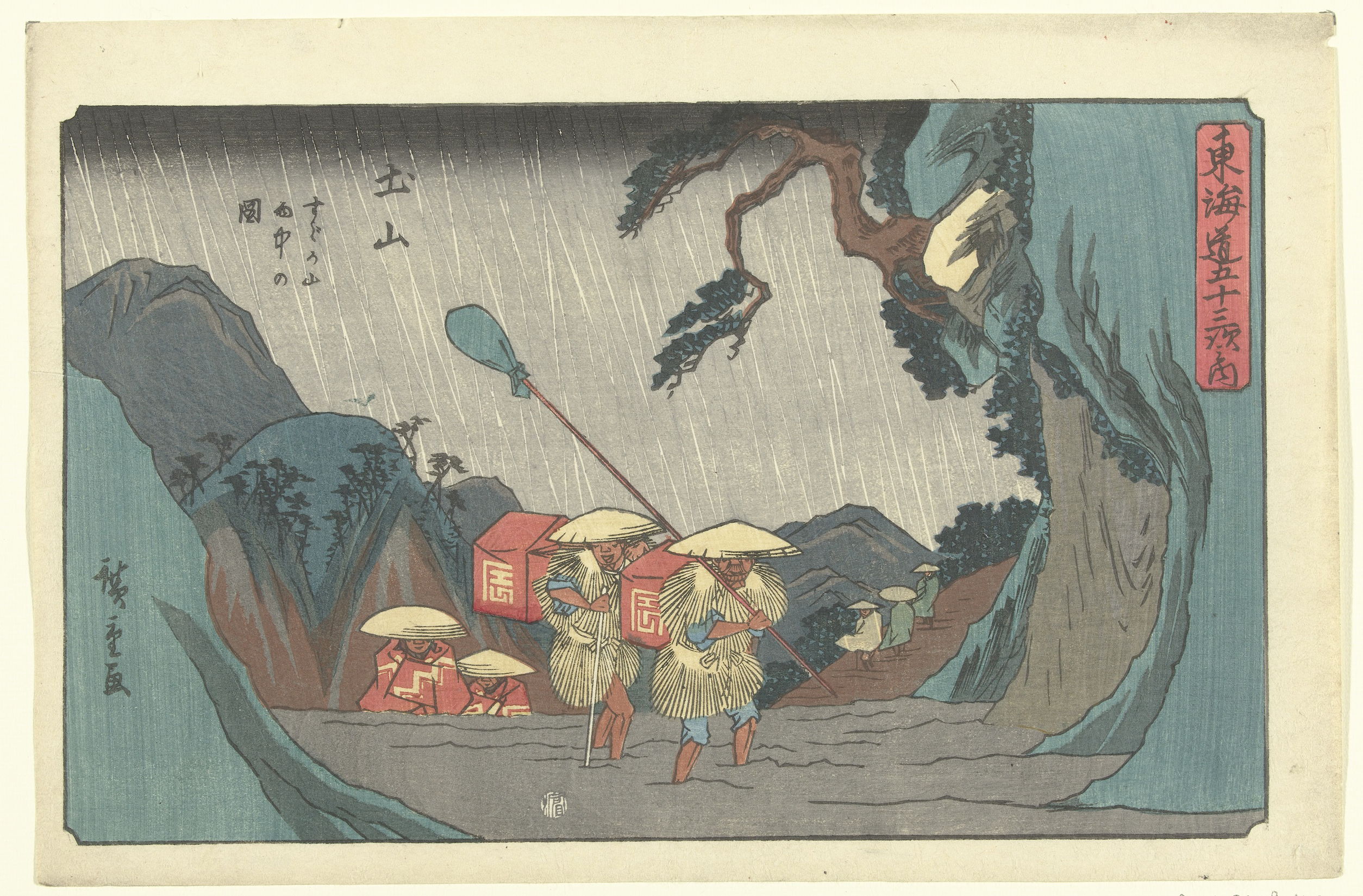
Hiroshige

== Major peaks ==
=== Suzuka Seven Mountains ===
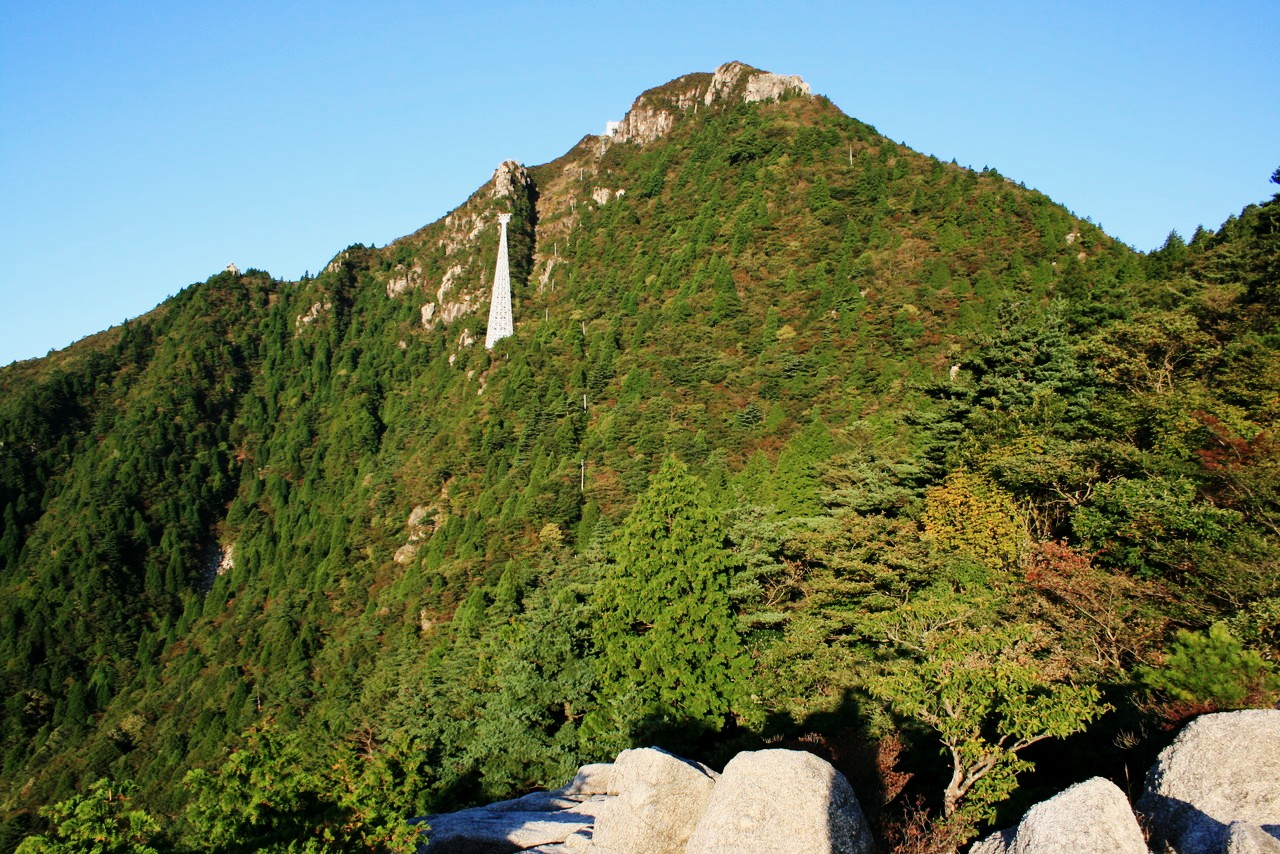
Mount Gozaisho and lattice tower of Gozaisho Ropeway seen from east

The following seven mountains are referred to as the "Suzuka Seven Mountains," which greatly increased their popularity and the number of visitors.

- Mount Fujiwara (藤原岳), 1,140 m (3,740 ft)
- Mount Ryū (竜ヶ岳), 1,099 m (3,606 ft)
- Mount Shaka (釈迦ヶ岳), 1,092 m (3,583 ft)
- Mount Gozaisho, 1,212 m (3,976 ft)
- Mount Kama (鎌ヶ岳), 1,161 m (3,809 ft)
- Mount Amagoi (雨乞岳), 1,238 m (4,062 ft)
- Mount Nyūdō (入道ヶ岳), 906 m (2,972 ft)

=== Other peaks ===
- Mount Ryōzen (霊仙山), 1,094 m (3,589 ft)
- Mount Oike (御池岳), 1,247 m (4,091 ft)
- Mount Watamuki (綿向山), 1,110 m (3,642 ft)
- Mount Nihonkoba (日本コバ), 934.1 m (3,065 ft)
- Hato Peak (羽鳥峰), 860 m (2,822 ft)

== See also ==
- Geography of Japan
