= Mount Oike =

Mountains of Shiga Prefecture

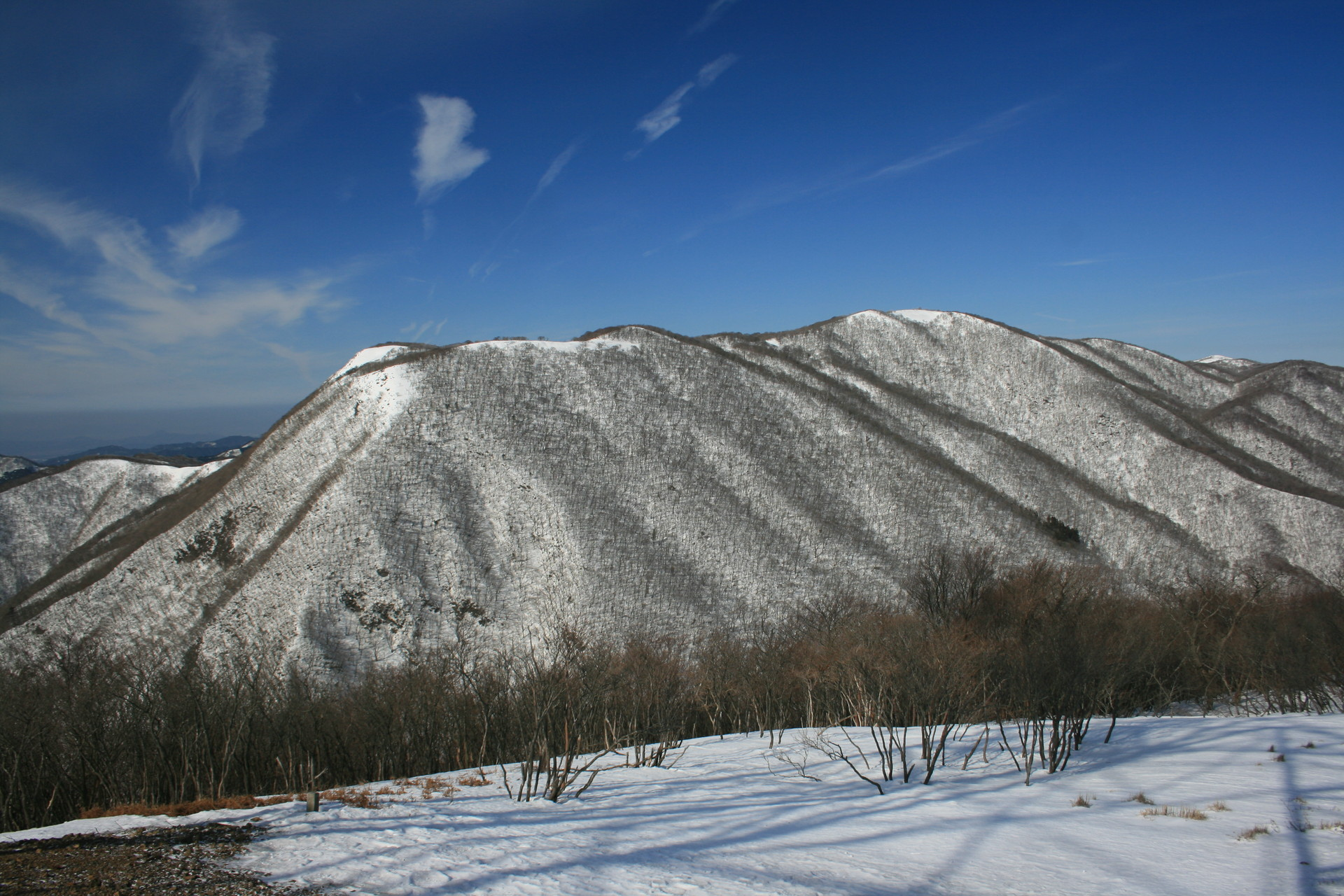

Highest point
- Elevation: 1,247 m (4,091 ft)
- Coordinates: 35°10′43″N 136°24′54″E

Geography
- Location within Japan
- Location: Suzuka Quasi-National Park
- Country: Japan
- Prefectures: Shiga
- Parent range: Suzuka Mountains

Mount Oike (御池岳, Oikegatake) is a mountain with an altitude of 1,247 m in the Suzuka Mountains in Higashiōmi, Shiga Prefecture. The northeastern side of the hillside is located on the border with Inabe, Mie Prefecture. It is the highest peak in the Suzuka Mountains and Higashiōmi.
