= Paramita Museum =

Museum of art in Ise, Mie, Japan

- パラミタミュージアム
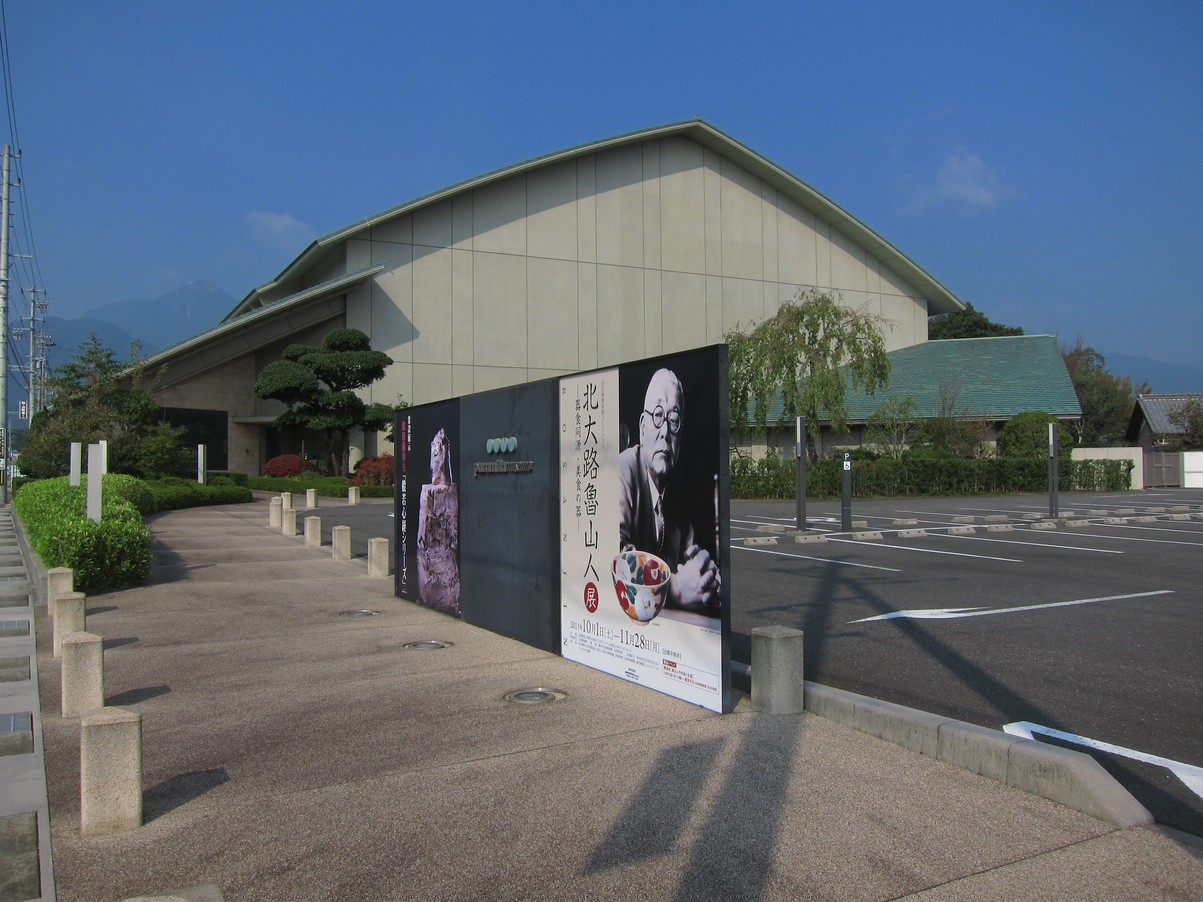
- Interactive map of the Paramita Museum area

General information
- Location: 21-6 Ōbaneen Matsugae-chō, Komono, Mie Prefecture, Japan
- Coordinates: 35°00′46″N 136°29′23″E
- Opened: March 2003

Website
- Official website (ja)

Paramita Museum (パラミタミュージアム, Paramita Myūjiamu) opened in Komono, Mie Prefecture, Japan in 2003. The collection, numbering some 4,700 items as of March 2023, includes paintings, craftworks, Ikeda Masuo's Heart Sutra Series (般若心経シリーズ), and a standing wooden statue of Jūichimen Kannon by Chōkai that has been designated an Important Cultural Property.

== See also ==
- Pāramitā
