= Suzuka Municipal Museum of Archaeology =

Museum in Yokkaichi, Mie, Japan

- 鈴鹿市考古博物館
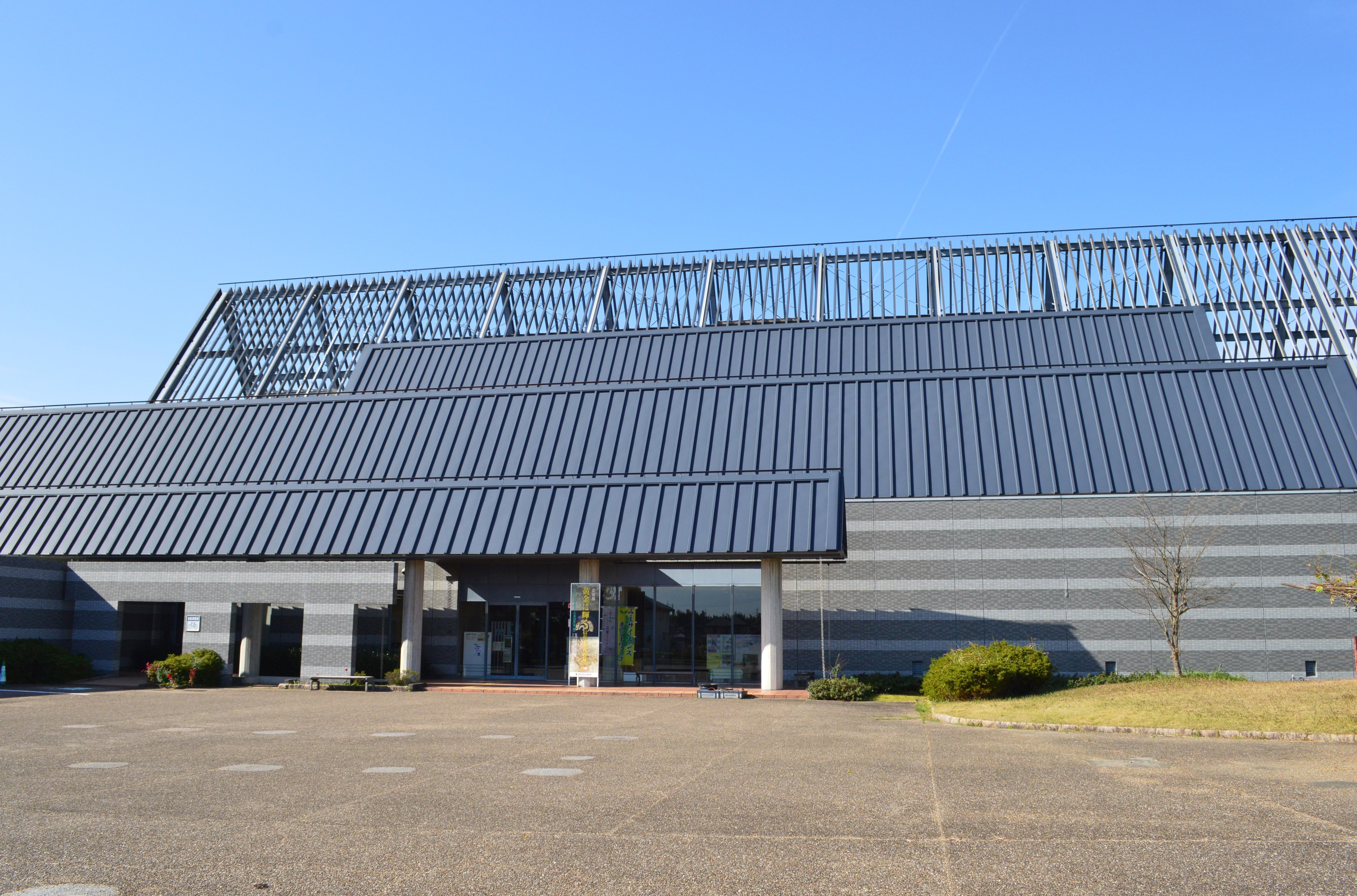
- Interactive map of the Suzuka Municipal Museum of Archaeology area

General information
- Location: 224 Kokubu-chō, Suzuka, Mie Prefecture, Japan
- Coordinates: 34°54′26″N 136°33′52″E
- Opened: October 1998

Website
- Official website (ja)

Suzuka Municipal Museum of Archaeology (鈴鹿市考古博物館, Suzuka-shi Kōko Hakubutsukan) opened adjacent to the site of Ise Kokubun-ji in Suzuka, Mie Prefecture, Japan in 1998. The collection and displays relate to the archaeology and ancient way of life in the area.

== See also ==
- Ise Kokufu
- Ōzuka Kofun
- Kanbe Castle
