= Mount Nasugahara =

Mountain in Japan

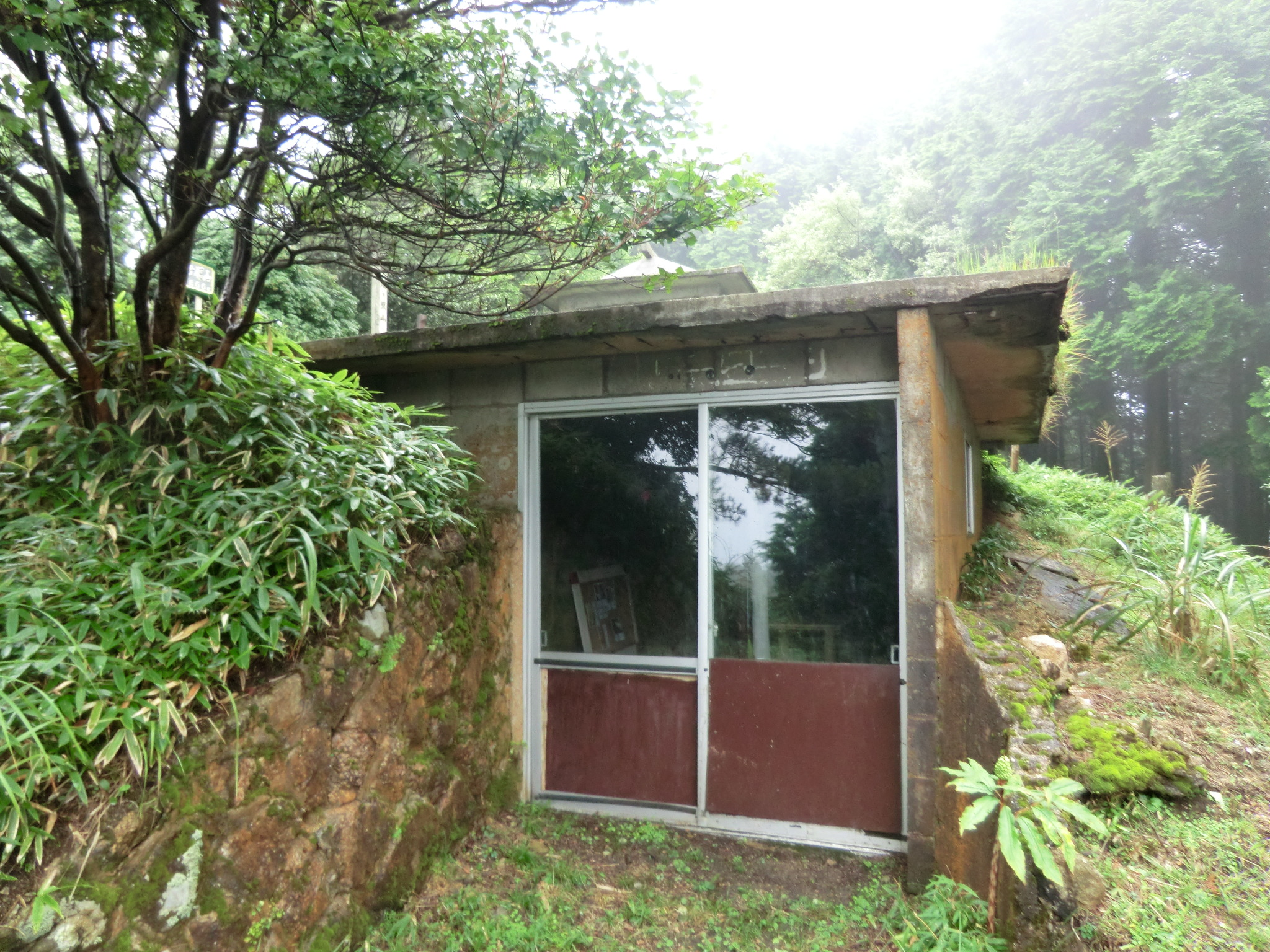

Highest point
- Elevation: 769 m (2,523 ft)
- Coordinates: 34°52′32″N 136°17′56″E

Geography
- Location within Japan
- Location: Suzuka Quasi-National Park
- Country: Japan
- Prefectures: Mie and Shiga
- Parent range: Suzuka Mountains

Mount Nasugahara (那須ヶ原山, Nasugahara-yama) is a mountain with an altitude of 769 m located in the Suzuka Mountains, in Mie and Shiga Prefectures. It is located within Suzuka Quasi-National Park.
