= Shima Kokubun-ji =

Buddhist temple in Shima, Japan

- 志摩国分寺
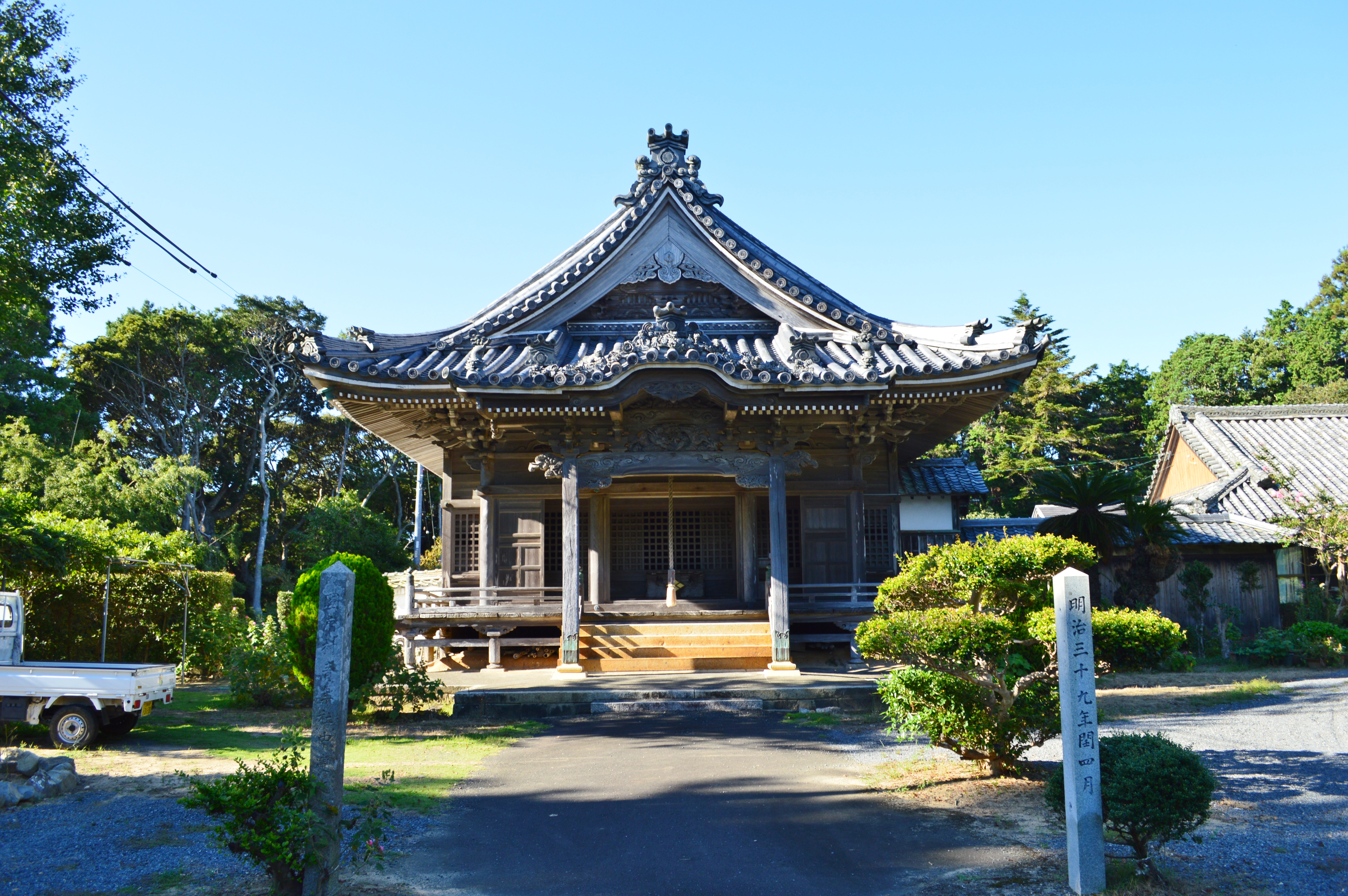
- Shima Kokubun-ji Hondo

- Location within Mie Prefecture Location within Japan

Religion
- Affiliation: Buddhist
- Deity: Yakushi Nyorai
- Rite: Tendai
- Status: active

Location
- Location: Shima, Mie
- Country: Japan
- Interactive map of Shima Kokubun-ji
- Coordinates: 34°20′54.48″N 136°52′48.03″E

Architecture
- Founder: Emperor Shōmu
- Completed: c.744AD

The Shima Kokubun-ji (志摩国分寺) is a Buddhist temple located in Ago neighborhood of the city of Shima, Mie Prefecture Japan. It belongs to the Tendai sect and its main image is a statue of Yakushi Nyōrai. The temple claims to be the successor to the original Nara period provincial temple ("kokubunji") of former Shima Province. The Nara-period temple ruins were designated a Shima Prefectural Historic Site in 1936.

== Overview ==
The Shoku Nihongi records that in 741, as the country recovered from a major smallpox epidemic, Emperor Shōmu ordered that a monastery and nunnery be established in every province. These government-sponsored temples were constructed for the purpose of promoting Buddhism as the national religion of Japan and standardiziing control of imperial rule over the provinces.

The Shima Kokubun-ji is located on a plateau in the eastern part of the Shima Peninsula in eastern Mie Prefecture. In the vicinity, the Shima kokufu (provincial capital) is presumed to be in the Kokufu neighborhood to the south, and it is known to have been a political and cultural center since ancient times. The exact date the temple was completed is uncertain. Shima Province was a small province and lacked political or economic power, so historical documents show that taxes from Owari Province were ordered to be used for its construction in 744. In 809 (per the Nihon Kōki, the temple was transferred to the control of the Ise Kokubun-ji. Per the Engishiki compiled in 927, the temple is not listed as receiving a government stipend, however, taxes from Ise, Owari, and Mikawa Provinces were used to repair the temple. The temple was burned down in the Ōnin War during the Muromachi period and rebuilt in 1483. In the mid-Edo period, it became a branch temple of Kan'ei-ji and converted to the Tendai sect (it is now a branch temple of Enryaku-ji). The current main hall was rebuilt in 1843 and remains as it is today.

The site of the ancient Shima Kokubun-ji is unclear because no archaeological excavation has been conducted to date, but the estimated location was designated as a Mie Prefecture Historic Site in 1936 because old roof tiles were collected there. In addition, the wooden seated Yakushi Nyorai statue from the Muromachi period has been designated as a Mie Prefecture Tangible Cultural Property, and the Main Hall and Dharani Sutra are designated as Shima City Tangible Cultural Properties.

== Cultural Properties ==
=== Mie Prefecture Designated Tangible Cultural Properties ===
- Wooden statue of seated Yakushi Nyorai (木造薬師如来坐像), late-Muromachi period (1504); The statue is 194 cm tall and made of hinoki cypress wood inlaid with inlay. It has white hair, a topknot with a beaded top, carved eyes, lacquer leaf, and spiral-shaped hair painted in ultramarine. The head is large, the shoulders are raised, and the knees are not bent too much, and both the face and body are roughly square. The robe is worn over the right shoulder, the right hand is in the fearless mudra, and the left hand holds a medicine jar.

== See also ==
- Provincial temple
