= Yunoyama Onsen =

Hot springs in Mie Prefecture, Japan

Coordinates: 35.0116°N 136.4736°E

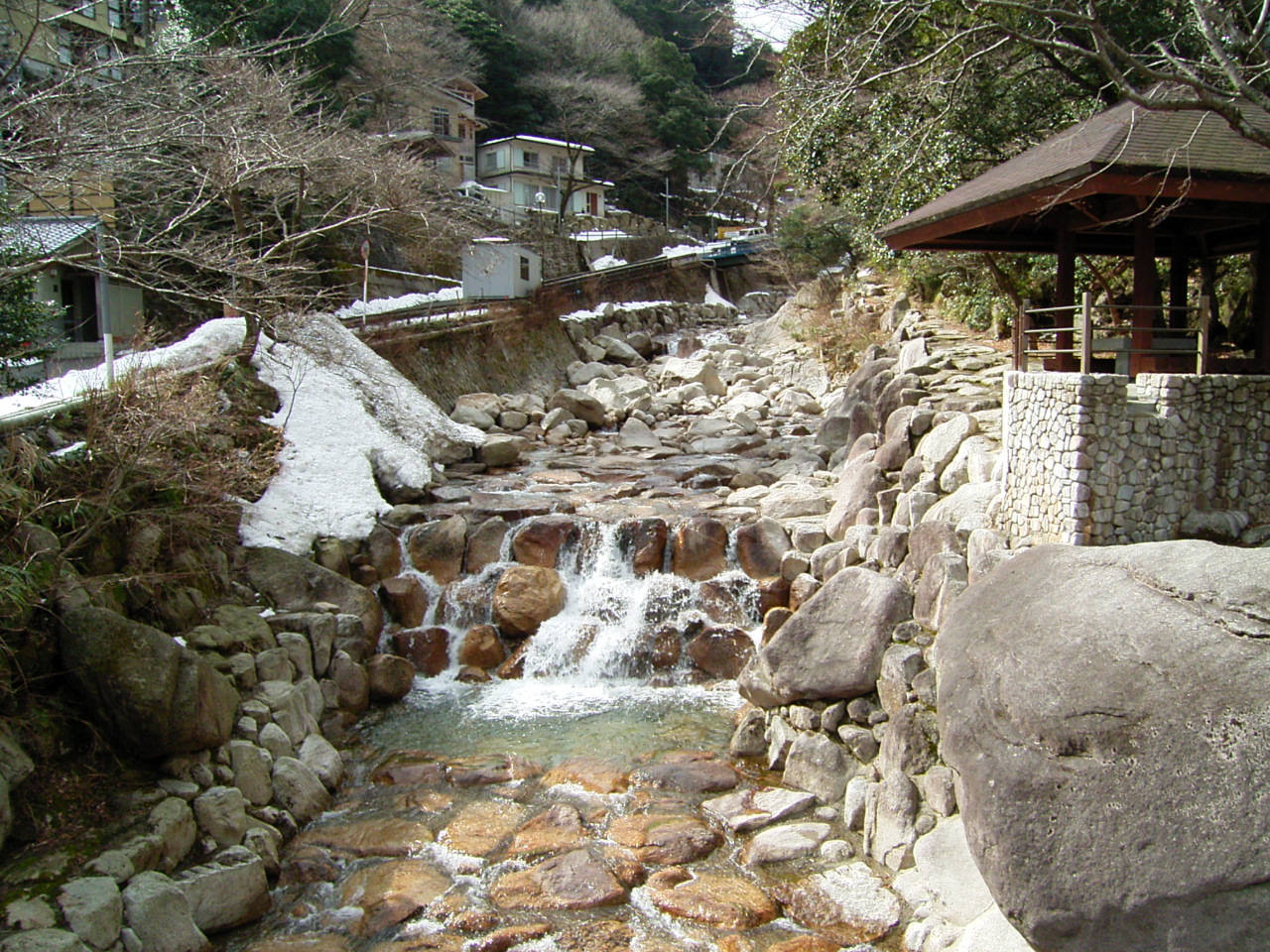
Yunoyama Onsen

Yunoyama Onsen (湯の山温泉), or Yunoyama Hot Springs, is a hot springs resort located near Mount Gozaisho in the town of Komono (Mie District), Mie Prefecture, Japan. The area is within the borders of the Suzuka Quasi-National Park.

Yunoyama Onsen has been a tourist destination since the Nara period, and remains popular to travellers especially from Nagoya, Osaka and Kyoto due to its ease of access via the Kintetsu Yunoyama Line.
