= Ise Kokufu =

Archaeological Site in Japan

Ise Kokufu ruins
- 伊勢国庁跡 (Japanese)
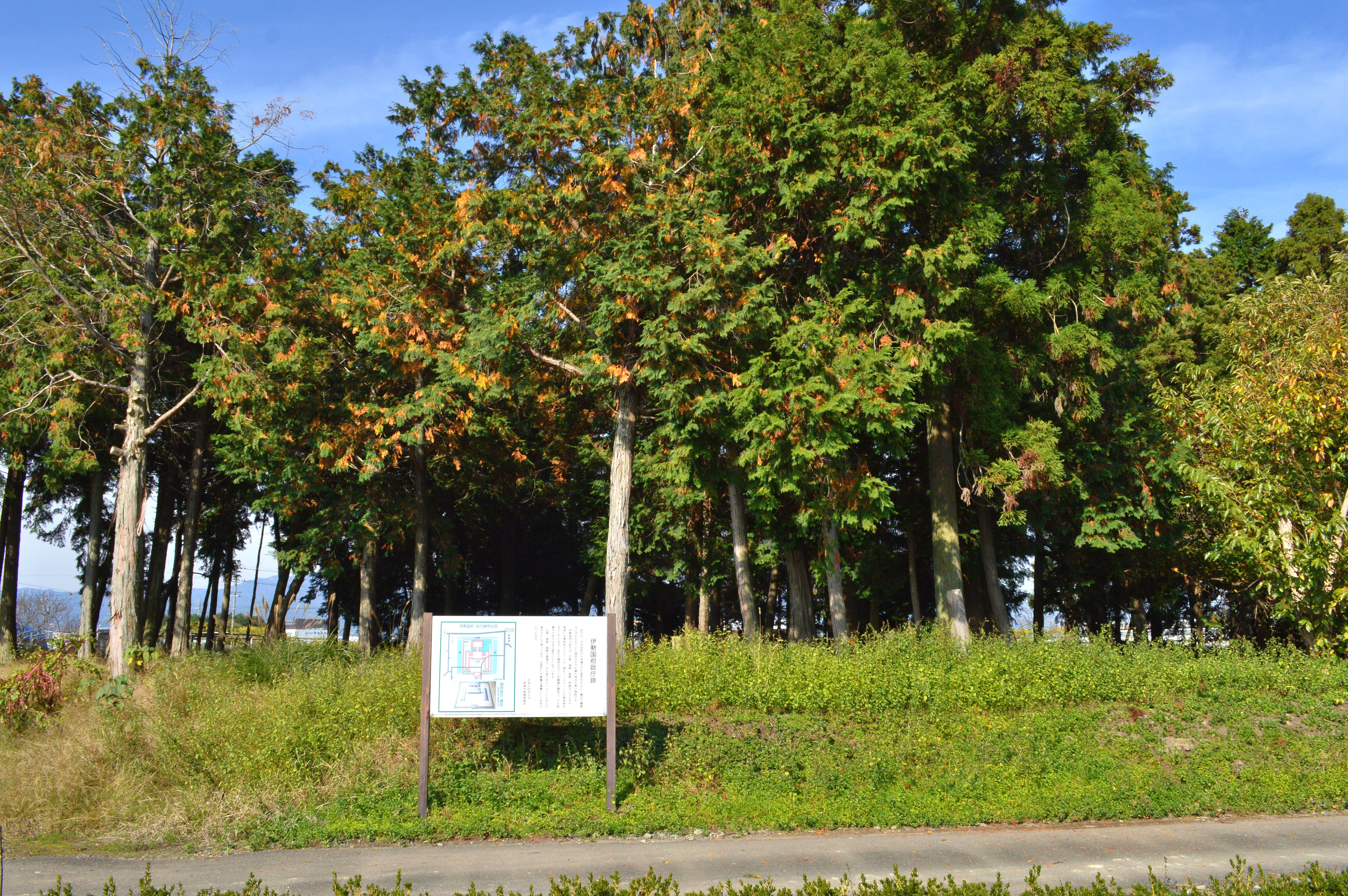
- Ise Kokufu ruins

- Ise Kokufu ruins Ise Kokufu (Japan)
- 34°53′03″N 136°29′50″E
- Periods: Nara - Heian period
- Location: Suzuka, Mie, Japan
- Region: Kansai region

Site notes
- Public access: Yes (no public facilities)

The Ise Provincial Capital ruins (伊勢国府跡, Ise Kokufu ato) is an archaeological site with the ruins of a Nara to Heian period government administrative complex located in the Hirose neighborhood of the city of Suzuka, Mie in the Kansai region of Japan. Identified as the ruins of the kokufu (provincial capital) of Ise Province, the site has been protected as a National Historic Site from 2002.

== Overview ==
In the late Nara period, after the establishment of a centralized government under the Ritsuryō system, local rule over the provinces was standardized under a kokufu (provincial capital), and each province was divided into smaller administrative districts, known as (郡, gun, kōri), composed of 2–20 townships in 715 AD. The kokufu complex contained the official residence and offices of the kokushi, the official sent from the central government as provincial governor, along with buildings housing offices concerned with general administration, farming, finance, police and military. In the periphery there was a provincial school (kokugaku), the garrison and storehouses for taxes.

The Wamyō Ruijushō from 935 AD, contains the earliest surviving listing of the capitals of the provinces and their location and states that the provincial capital for Ise Province was located in ancient Suzuka County. Archaeological excavations have uncovered what appear to be the foundations for the standardized provincial capital layout of buildings; however, it appears that construction was halted for unknown reasons before the complex was completed. The site is located on the south bank of the Suzuka River, which runs through the northern part of Mie Prefecture, at an elevation of about 50 meters. Since ancient times, this area has been called the "Chōja Mansion ruins", and a large quantity of old roof tiles were found scattered in a range of about 600 meters from east-to-west by about 800 meters north—to-south. The government office group of structures is in the southern end of the site, in what was found to be a moated enclosure with earthen ramparts, measuring is about 80 meters east-to-west by 110 meters north-to-south. The buildings were all built with foundation stones on a raised platform about one meter above the surrounding ground level. These ruins date from the middle Nara period.

A similar set of ruins exists approximately 200 meters to the north, and a third set of ruins exists 300 meters to the east. These are possible sites for the early Nara period complex and the Heian period complex and are included in the National Historic Site designation, but have not been adequately excavated.

The site is now backfilled and has mostly reverted to rice paddy. It is about a one-hour walk from Idagawa Station on the JR West Kansai Main Line.

== See also ==
- List of Historic Sites of Japan (Mie)
