= Yunoyama Line =

Japanese railway line

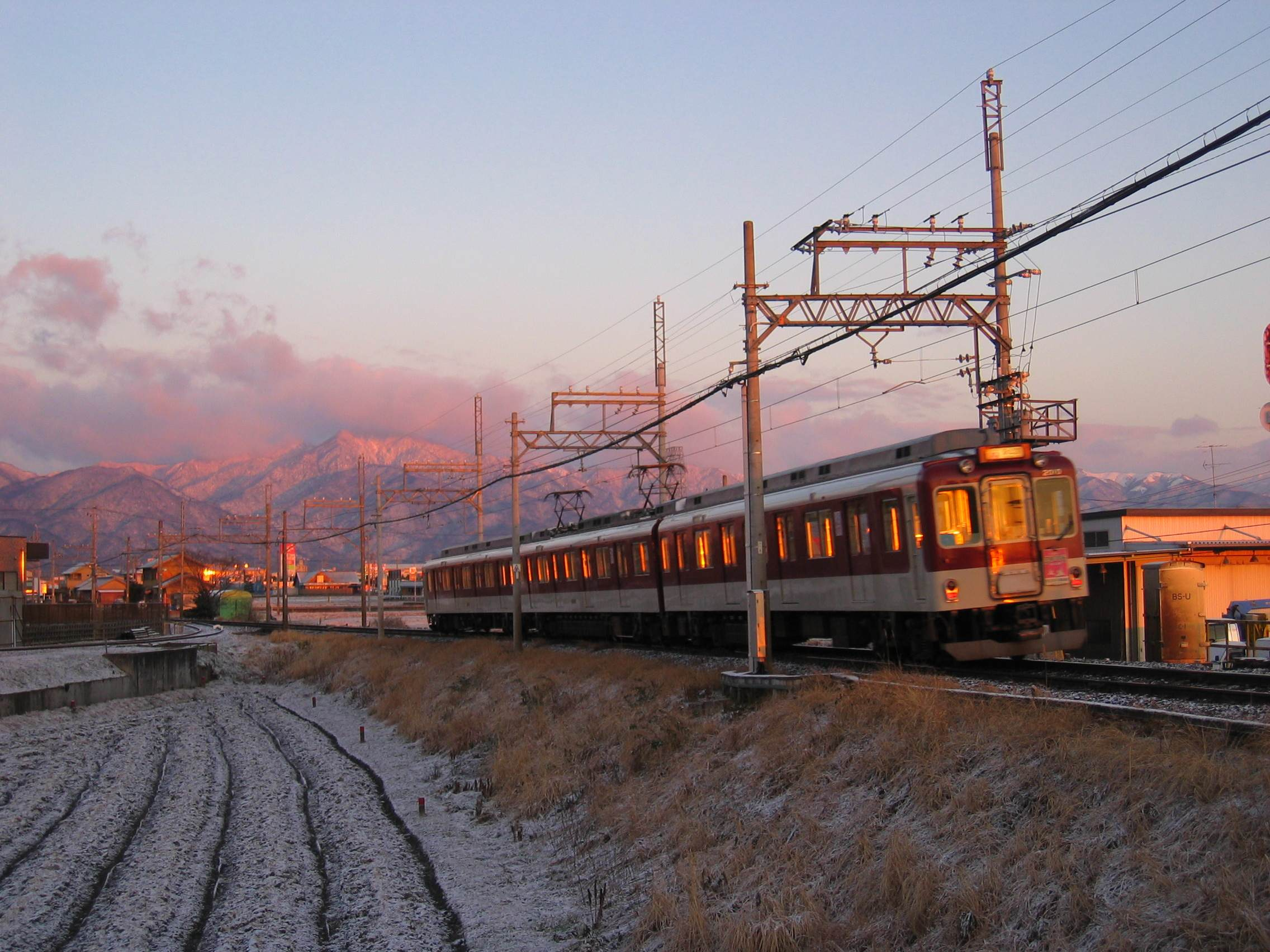
- Local bound for Yunoyama

Overview
- Owner: Kintetsu Railway
- Line number: K
- Locale: Yokkaichi, Komono; Mie Prefecture
- Termini: Kintetsu-Yokkaichi; Yunoyama-Onsen
- Stations: 10
- Color on map: (#1B3DB0)

Service
- Type: Regional rail Commuter rail
- System: Kintetsu Railway
- Operator(s): Kintetsu Railway

History
- Opened: 24 September 1913; 112 years ago
- Last extension: 5 March 1916; 110 years ago

Technical
- Line length: 15.4 km (9.6 mi)
- Number of tracks: Entirely single-tracked
- Track gauge: 1,435 mm (4 ft 8 1/2 in) standard gauge
- Electrification: 1,500 V DC (Overhead line)
- Operating speed: 80 km/h (50 mph)
- Signalling: Automatic closed block
- Train protection system: Kintetsu ATS

The Yunoyama Line (湯の山線, Yunoyama-sen) is a railway line of the Japanese private railway company Kintetsu Railway, connecting Kintetsu-Yokkaichi Station (Yokkaichi, Mie Prefecture) and Yunoyama-Onsen Station (Komono, Mie Prefecture) in Japan.

The line connects with the Nagoya Line and Yokkaichi Asunarou Railway Utsube Line at Kintetsu-Yokkaichi Station.

== History ==
The Yunoyama Line was originally conceived and built by Yokkaichi Railway (四日市鉄道, Yokkaichi Tetsudō) in the 1910s. The line was opened by two stages in 1 June and September 1913, between Yunoyama-onsen (Yunoyama at the time) and Kintetsu Yokkaichi (Suwa at the time), as a 762 mm (2 ft 6 in) narrow-gauge railway. In 1916, an extension from the line's origin, Suwa to Yokkaichi was added. However, this extension was closed on 29 November 1927 due to the extension of the Ise Electric Railway to Kuwana Station.

The line was electrified at 750V in November 1921. The ownership of the line changed when the Yokkaichi Railway was merged into Mie Railway (now Mie Kotsu) on 18 March 1931. On 23 March 1964, the track gauge was widened to standard-gauge, and the voltage of the line was raised to 1,500 V. On 1 April 1965, Mie Railway was merged into Kintetsu Railway.

== Service ==
Local (普通 futsū)

For Yokkaichi
For Yunoyama-Onsen
Locals stop at every station.
All trains offer conductor-less (one man) service.
Trains run twice per hour during the day, three or four times per hour in the mornings and evenings.

Limited express service on the Yunoyama Line ended in 2004.

=== 2008 limited express service ===
Direct limited express service to and from Nagoya was temporarily resumed on weekends and holidays in late July and early August 2008 in commemoration of the 50th anniversary of the Gozaisho Ropeway as well as the 40th anniversary of Suzuka National Park. These trains ran once a day in each direction. Limited express trains on the Yunoyama Line will go from Kintetsu-Yokkaichi to Yunoyama-Onsen without stopping.

== Stations ==
All stations are located in Mie Prefecture.

No.	Picture	Station		Distance (km)	Connections	Location
K21		Kintetsu-Yokkaichi	近鉄四日市	0.0	E Nagoya Line; Yokkaichi Asunarou Railway Utsube Line	Yokkaichi
K22		Nakagawara	中川原	1.7		Yokkaichi
K23		Ise-Matsumoto	伊勢松本	2.8		Yokkaichi
K24		Ise-Kawashima	伊勢川島	5.3		Yokkaichi
K25		Takatsuno	高角	6.7		Yokkaichi
K26		Sakura	桜	8.7		Yokkaichi
K27		Komono	菰野	11.3		Komono
K28		Naka-Komono	中菰野	12.6		Komono
K29		Ōbane-en	大羽根園	13.5		Komono
K30		Yunoyama-Onsen	湯の山温泉	15.4		Komono

=== Ridership ===
No.	Station	Passengers (2023)
K21	Kintetsu-Yokkaichi	39,575
K22	Nakagawara	1,616
K23	Ise-Matsumoto	2,355
K24	Ise-Kawashima	1,916
K25	Takatsuno	912
K26	Sakura	2,739
K27	Komono	1,926
K28	Naka-Komono	941
K29	Ōbane-en	692
K30	Yunoyama-Onsen	319
