= Suzuka River =

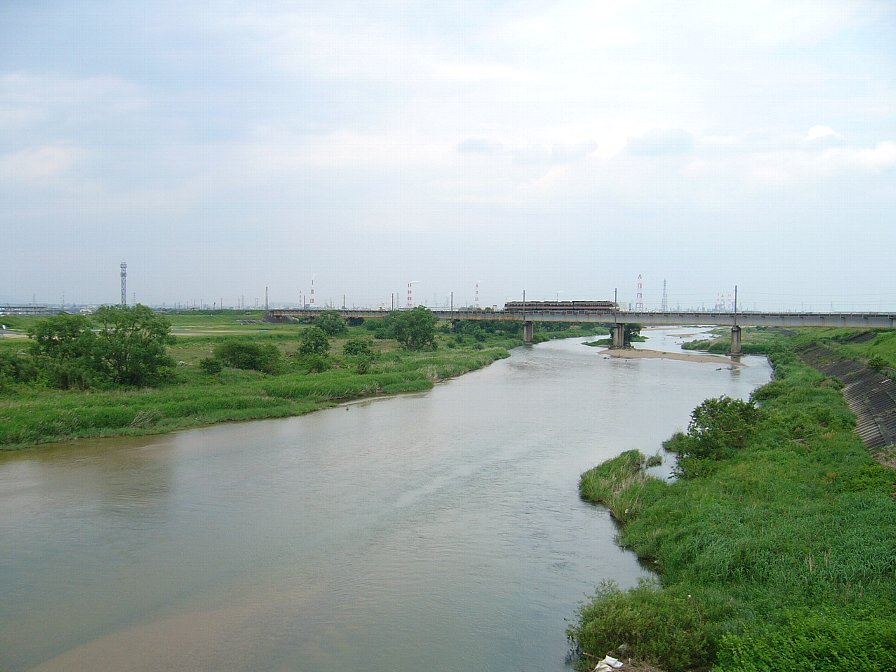

- Location within Japan
- Native name: 鈴鹿川 (Japanese)

Location
- Country: Japan

Physical characteristics
- Source
  - location: Mount Nasugahara
  - elevation: 800 m (2,600 ft)
- Mouth
  - location: Ise Bay
  - coordinates: 34.9331383°N 136.6426535°E
- Length: 38 km (24 mi)
- Basin size: 323 km^{2} (125 sq mi)
- Discharge
  - average: 7.21 m^{3}/s (255 cu ft/s)

Basin features
- Population: 110,000

The Suzuka River (鈴鹿川, Suzuka-gawa) is a major river that flows through northern Mie Prefecture on the island of Honshū, Japan. It is officially classified as a Class 1 river by the Japanese government, one of four Class 1 rivers that flow solely through Mie.

The river's source is on Mount Nasugahara, which stands on the border of Mie and Shiga Prefectures. From the mountain, it then flows eastwards, eventually flowing into Ise Bay.

A section of the Tōkaidō, a major travel route in the Edo era, ran along the north side of the river for most of its course. The modern versions of this portion of the old Tokaido, the Kansai Main Line and Route 1, likewise run parallel with the river.

== Course ==
Mie Prefecture
Kameyama • Suzuka • Yokkaichi
