= Gozaisho Ropeway =

Cable car

Coordinates: 35°1′5.7″N 136°26′6.9″E

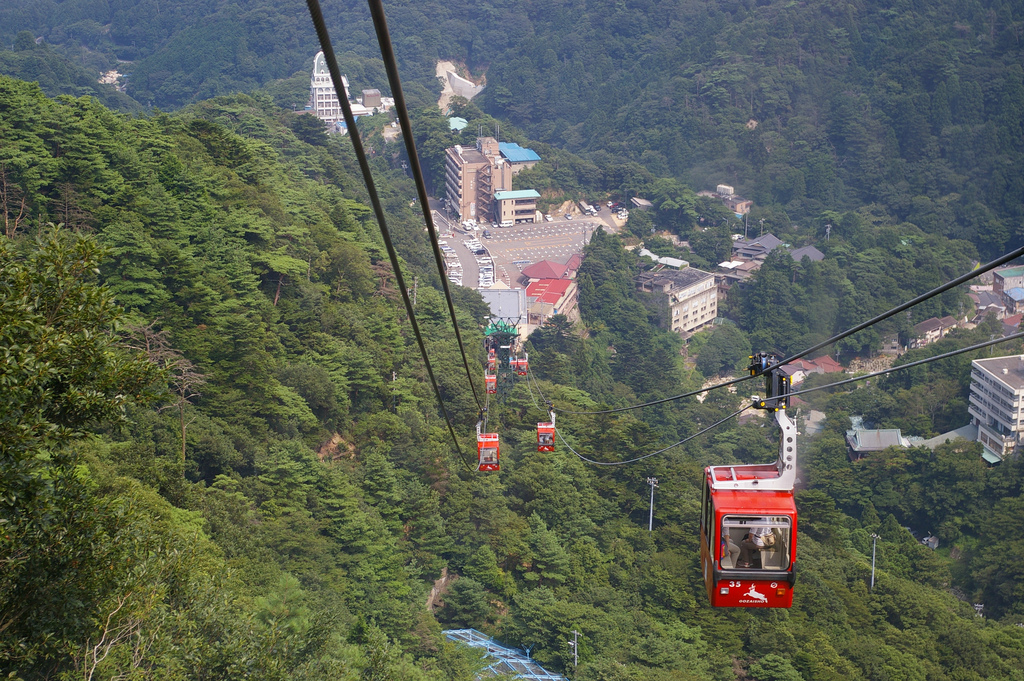
Gozaisho Ropeway.

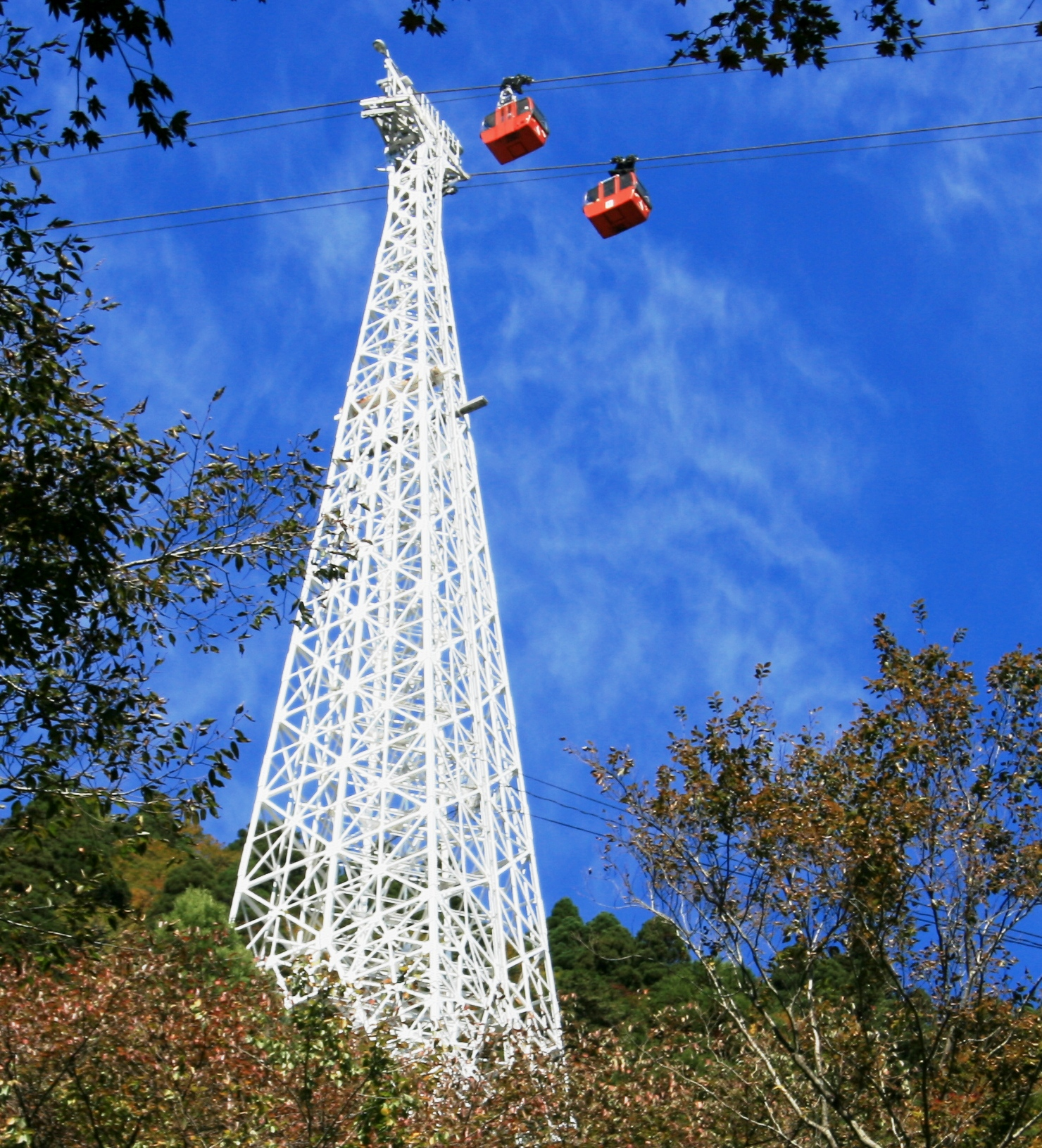
High iron tower of Gozaisho Ropeway.

The Gozaisho Ropeway (御在所ロープウェイ, Gozaisho Rōpuwei) is the name of a Japanese aerial lift line, as well as its operator. Opened in 1959, the lift carries passengers up to Mount Gozaisho (御在所岳) in Komono, Mie, offering views of Yokkaichi and Ise Bay. The mountain is known for its scenery and the nearby Yunoyama Onsen. The line links to a chairlift line that goes to the summit.

== Basic data ==
- System: Bi-cable detachable Gondola lift
- Distance: 2.1 kilometres (1.3 mi)
- Vertical interval: 780 m (2,559 ft)
- Passenger capacity per a cabin: 10
- Cabins: 38
- Stations: 2

== See also ==
- Mount Gozaisho
- List of aerial lifts in Japan
