= Suzuka Quasi-National Park =

Quasi-national park in Mie and Shiga prefecture, Japan

- 鈴鹿国定公園
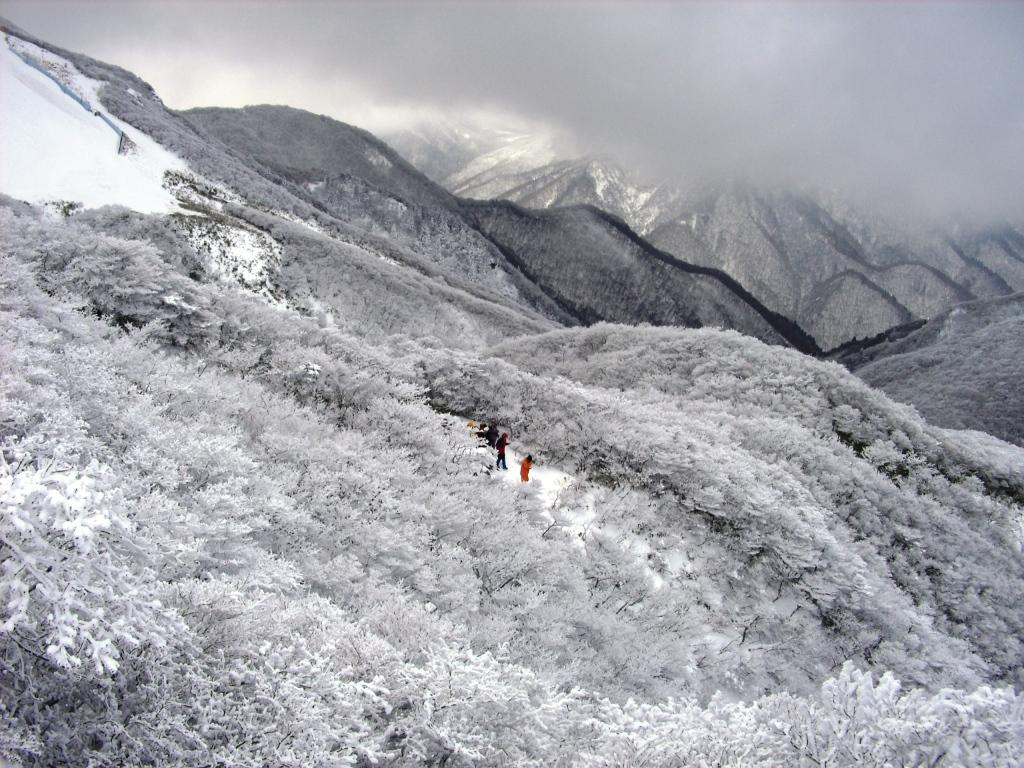
- Mount Gozaisho

- Location within Japan
- Location: Mie/Shiga Prefecture, Japan
- Coordinates: 34°51′47″N 136°19′44″E
- Area: 298.21 km^{2} (115.14 sq mi)
- Established: 22 July 1968

Suzuka Quasi-National Park (鈴鹿国定公園, Suzuka Kokutei Kōen) is a Quasi-National Park in Mie and Shiga Prefectures, Japan. It was established in 1968.

== Sites of interest ==
- Mount Gozaisho, Suzuka Mountains

== Related municipalities ==
- Mie: Iga, Inabe, Kameyama, Komono, Suzuka, Yokkaichi
- Shiga: Higashiōmi, Hino, Kōka, Taga

== See also ==
- List of national parks of Japan
- Ise-no-Umi Prefectural Natural Park
