= Komono =

Komono 菰野町
- Town
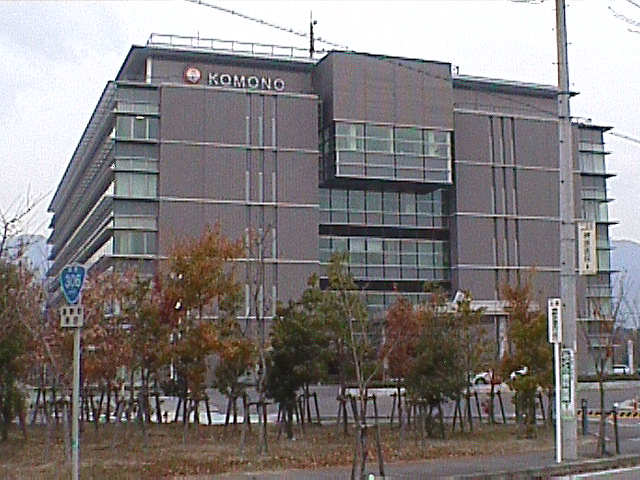
- Komono Town Office

- Flag Seal

- Location of Komono in Mie Prefecture

- Coordinates: 35°1′N 136°30′E
- Country: Japan
- Region: Kansai
- Prefecture: Mie
- District: Mie

Government
  - Mayor: Takayuki Shibata

Area
  - Total: 106.89 km^{2} (41.27 sq mi)

Population (September 2021)
  - Total: 41,542
  - Density: 388.64/km^{2} (1,006.6/sq mi)
- Time zone: UTC+9 (Japan Standard Time)
- Tree: Zelkova serrata
- Bird: Japanese bush warbler
- Beast: Japanese serow
- Phone number: 059-391-1111
- Address: 1480 Komoro, Komoro-chō, Mie-gun, Mie-ken 510-1292
- Website: Official website

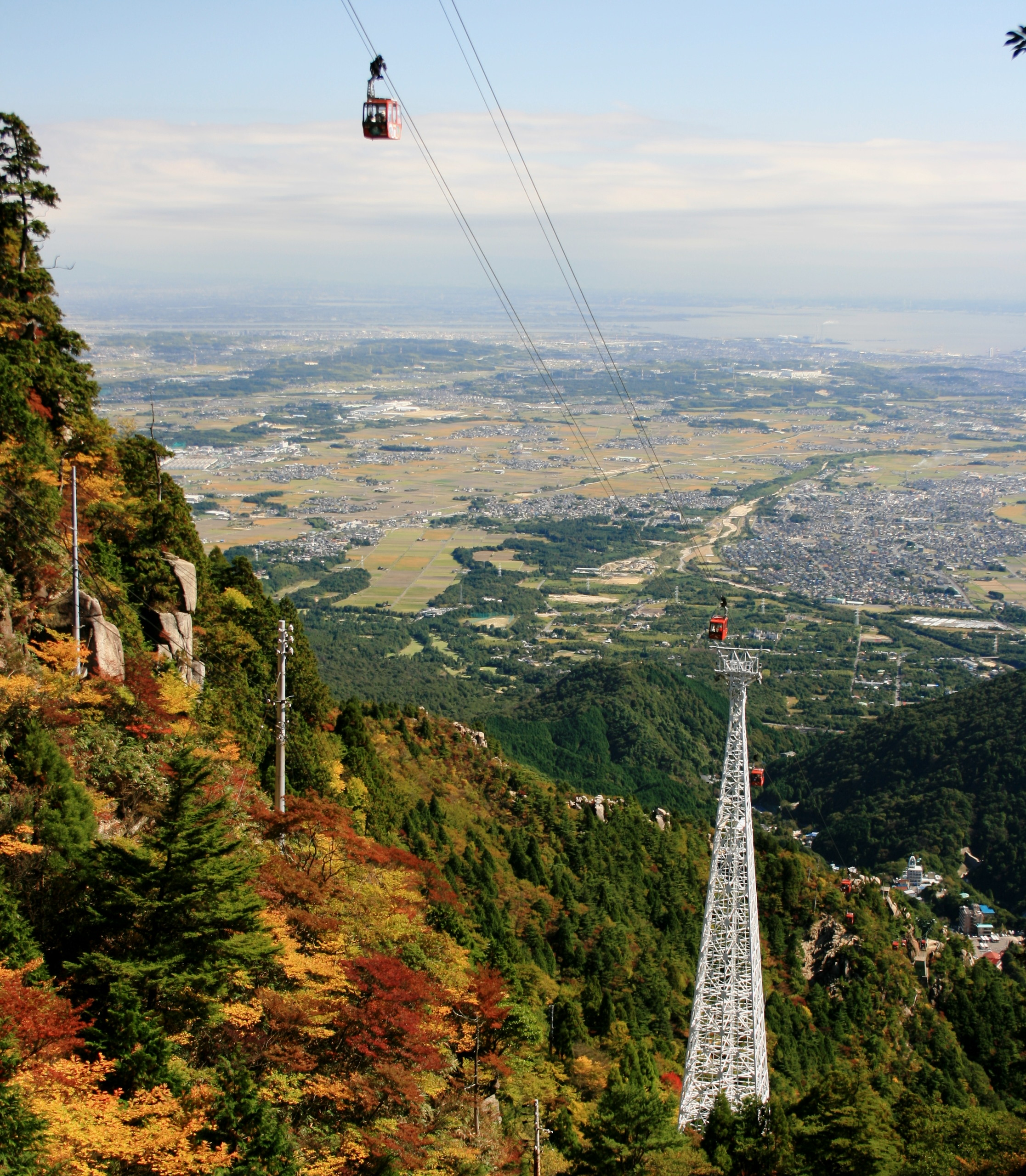
Gozaisho Ropeway and Komono in distance

Komono (菰野町, Komono-chō) is a town located in Mie Prefecture, Japan. As of 1 September 2021, the town had an estimated population of 41,542 in 16883 households and a population density of 390 persons per km^{2}. The total area of the town was 106.89 square kilometres (41.27 sq mi).

== Geography ==
Komono is located in the mountainous region of northern Mie Prefecture, bordering on Shiga Prefecture. Parts of the town are within the limits of the Suzuka Quasi-National Park.

=== Neighboring municipalities ===
Mie Prefecture

- Inabe
- Yokkaichi

Shiga Prefecture

- Higashiōmi
- Kōka

== Climate ==
Komono has a humid subtropical climate (Köppen Cfa) characterized by warm summers and cool winters with light to no snowfall. The average annual temperature in Komono is 14.0 °C. The average annual rainfall is 1737 mm with September as the wettest month. The temperatures are highest on average in August, at around 25.6 °C, and lowest in January, at around 2.6 °C.

== Demographics ==
Per Japanese census data, the population of Komono has increased steadily over the past 60 years.

Historical population
Year	Pop.	±%
1920	16,101	—
1930	16,363	+1.6%
1940	15,849	−3.1%
1950	20,897	+31.9%
1960	20,217	−3.3%
1970	24,187	+19.6%
1980	29,373	+21.4%
1990	32,263	+9.8%
2000	37,972	+17.7%
2010	39,973	+5.3%

== History ==
Komoro is located in ancient Ise Province and was the center of 12,000 koku Komono Domain under the Tokugawa shogunate, ruled by the Hijikata clan from 1600 until the Meiji restoration of 1871. In the establishment of municipalities under the Meiji government’s reforms, it became Komoro village within Mie District of Mie Prefecture on April 1, 1889. Komoro was elevated to town status in 1928.

== Government ==
Komono has a mayor-council form of government with a directly elected mayor and a unicameral city council of 18 members. Komono contributes two members to the Mie Prefectural Assembly. In terms of national politics, the town is part of Mie 3rd district of the lower house of the Diet of Japan.

== Education ==
Komono has five public elementary schools and two public middle schools operated by the town government. The town has one public high school operated by the Mie Prefectural Board of Education..

== Transportation ==
=== Railway ===
Kintetsu Railway Kintetsu Railway – Yunoyama Line

- Komono - Naka-Komono - Ōbane-en - Yunoyama-Onsen

=== Highway ===
- Shin-Meishin Expressway
- National Route 306
- National Route 477

== Local attractions ==
- Gozaisho Ropeway
- Yunoyama Onsen

== Notable people ==
- Takuma Asano, professional football player
- Yuki Nishi, professional baseball player
- Harutomo Tsuji, professional baseball player
- Tomoya Uchida, professional football player
