= Akogi ware =

Type of Japanese pottery

Akogi ware (阿漕焼 Akogi-yaki) is a type of Banko ware pottery traditionally produced in Tsu, Mie Prefecture, Japan. The name of the pottery is derived from the Akogi inlet. With a history of over 200 years, Akogi ware draws on the style of Banko ware. It is a traditional craft designated by the Mie Prefecture.

== History ==
The progenitor of Akogi ware, as well as Banko ware, is considered to be Numinami Zuiga, apprentice of Nunami Rouzan. Under the invitation of the Todo clan, Zuiga opened a kiln in the village of Andou, beginning to produce Banko ware. Because of this, Banko ware was originally called Andou ware (Andou-yaki). Afterwards, the workshop and its kiln moved towards the Baba grounds (馬場屋敷, Baba-yashiki), an area located near the local feudal lord's castle. From around this time, the products produced were associated with the nearby Akogi bay and eventually became known as Akogi ware. The workshop ran under the authority of the han and proved itself to be useful, primarily producing miscellaneous utensils for daily-use.

While the operation was later suspended, Kurata Kyuhachi, a wealthy merchant, was tasked by the han to revive the craft. However, Kyuhachi, a dilettante, only treated the revival effort as a hobby. Following this and the advent of the Meiji Restoration and its subsequent abolition of the han system, support of the craft originally coming from the han government was cut off. As a result, wealthy merchants began to jointly support the continuance of Akogi ware. As a result, conflicts arose and a long-maintained workshop (Sendou Akogi) ceased operations due to a shortage of staff, with the established Dote Akogi workshop also closing down due to sloppy management.

Despite this, many people still valued Akogi ware, and in 1901 the Akogi Ware Pottery Company was established. However, shortly after its establishment, Japan was faced with Russo-Japanese War. The resulting economic recession forced the company to close down its production facilities. Even after its closure, influential businessmen and craftsmen attempted to once again revive the craft, but due in part to the influence of mechanization, small-batch production of Akogi ware only went through cycles of ups and downs of public interest.

In the Showa period (1926-1989), Tsu City mayor Horikawa Yoshiya invited Banko ware artisan Fukumori Enji to once again try to revive the craft. While at first the business faced difficult business conditions, after the Second World War, the business changed focus from producing miscellaneous utensils for daily-use to creating expensive value-added tea ceremony utensils, finally cementing Akogi ware's revival.

== Special Characteristics ==
The defining quality of the products themselves are how they are illustrated in the style of Kutani ware, while still following the original style of Banko ware. The ware is decorated with beguiling colors such as vermilion, green, yellow, purple, and navy blue. Additionally, depending on the period, different forms can be found.

== Primary Works ==
- Color-variated, handle-attached pitchers in the shape of a gourd - Produced by Fukuda Choubee
- Rice bowls/tea cups (茶碗 Chawan)
- Vases
- Tea containers
