= 富田駅 =

富田駅 is the name of multiple train stations in Japan:

- Tomida Station
- Tomita Station
- Tonda Station
