= Kusu, Mie =

Dissolved municipality in Mie prefecture, Japan

Kusu (楠町, Kusu-chō) was a town located in Mie District, Mie Prefecture, Japan.

As of 2003, the town had an estimated population of 11,153 and a density of 1,437.24 persons per km^{2}. The total area was 7.76 km^{2}.

On February 7, 2005, Kusu was merged into the expanded city of Yokkaichi.
