= Yokkaichi Nursing and Medical Care University =

Private university in Yokkaichi, Japan

Coordinates: 35.0226°N 136.6084°E

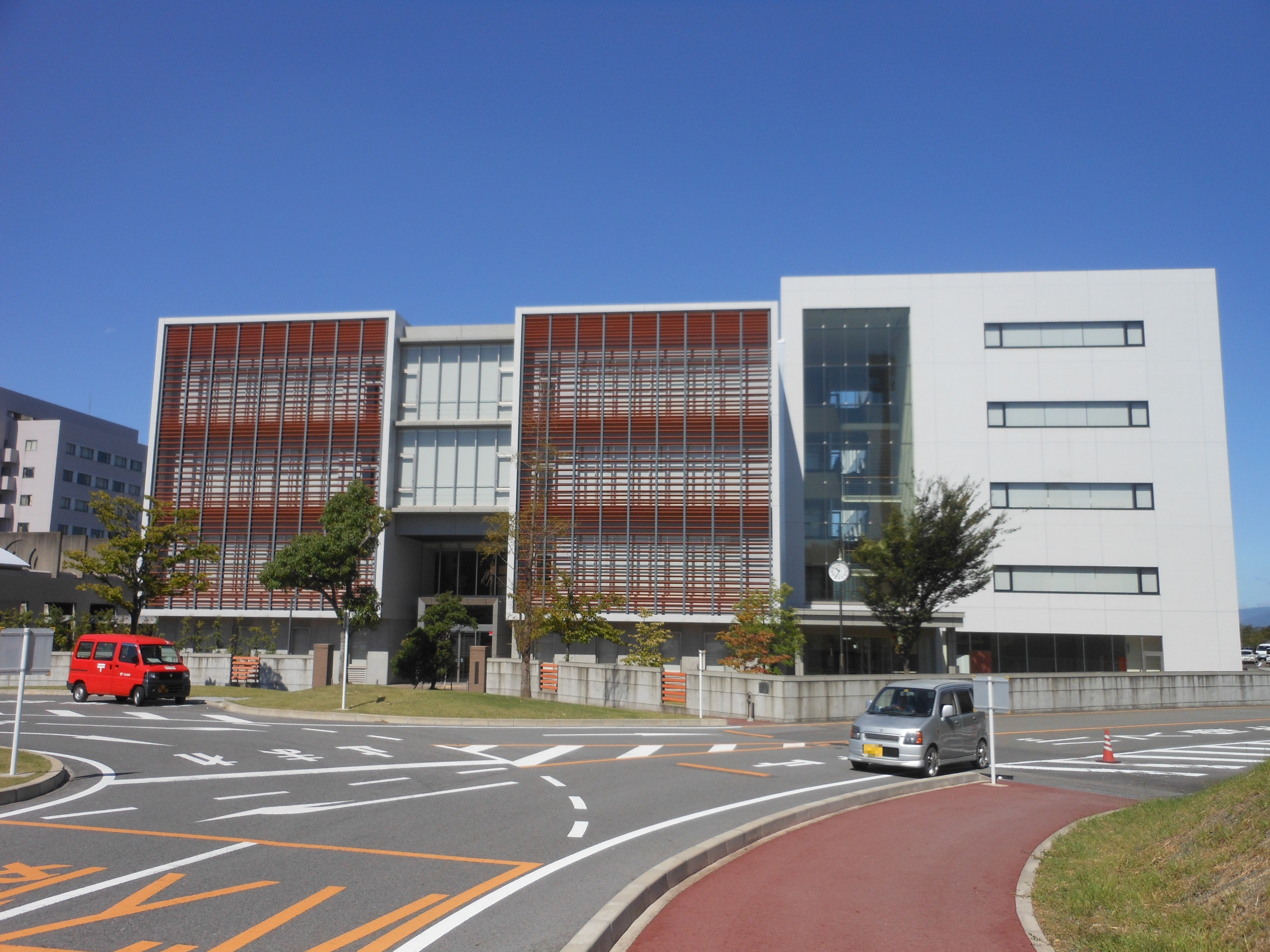
Yokkaichi Nursing and Medical Care University

Yokkaichi Nursing and Medical Care University (四日市看護医療大学, Yokkaichi kango iryō daigaku) is a private university in Yokkaichi, Mie, Japan, established in 2007.
