= Yokkaichi Municipal Museum =

Museum in Yokkaichi, Mie, Japan

- 四日市市立博物館
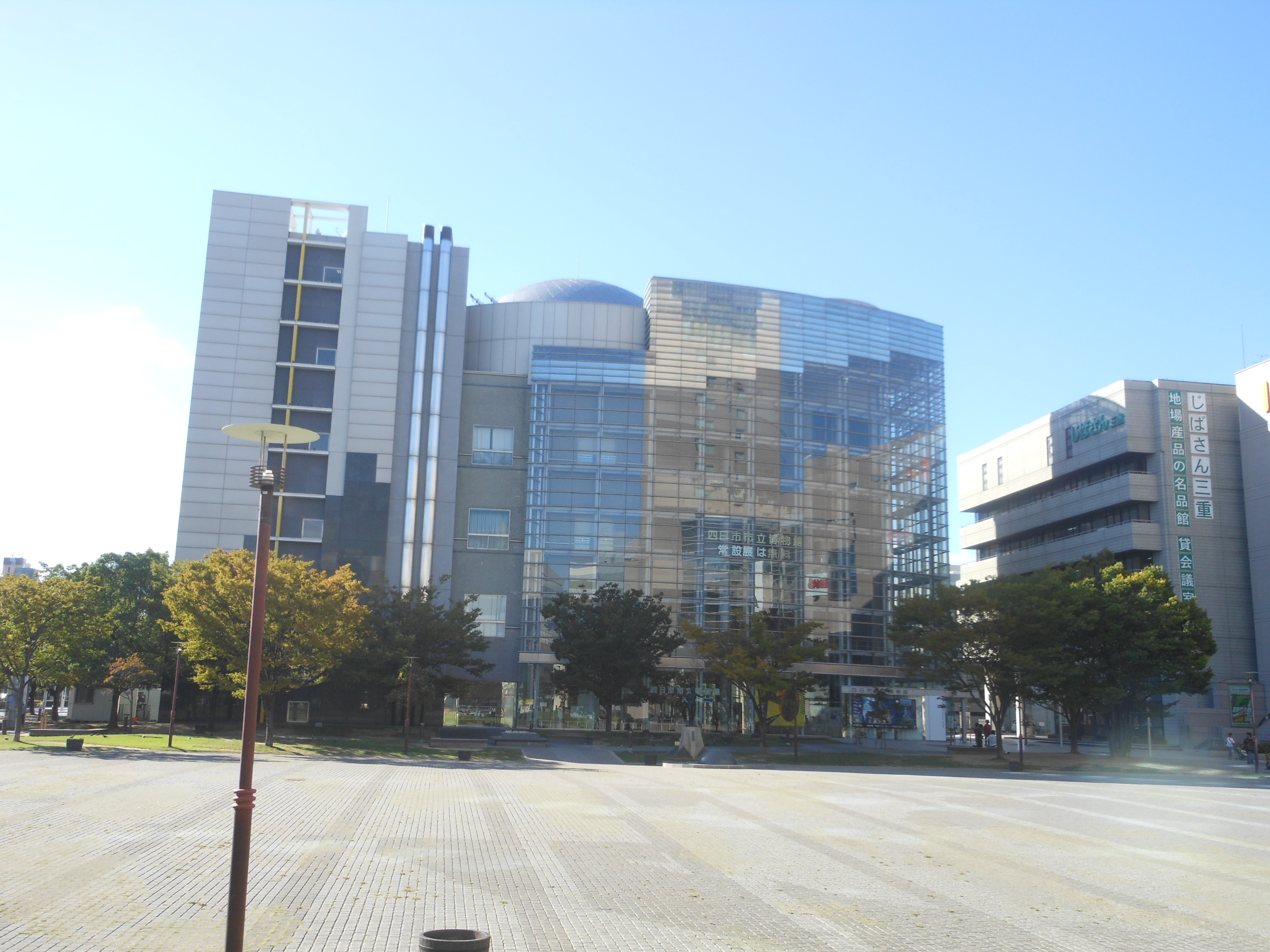
- Interactive map of the Yokkaichi Municipal Museum area

General information
- Location: 1-3-16 Yasujima, Yokkaichi, Mie Prefecture, Japan
- Coordinates: 34°58′04″N 136°36′56″E
- Opened: 1 November 1993

Website
- Official website (ja)

Yokkaichi Municipal Museum (四日市市立博物館, Yokkaichi Shiritsu Hakubutsukan) opened in Yokkaichi, Mie Prefecture, Japan in 1993. The displays relate to the history of the area from geological times to the present and there is also a planetarium.

== See also ==
- Mie Prefectural Museum
- Kurube Kanga ruins
