= Tomidahama Station =

Railway station in Yokkaichi, Mie Prefecture, Japan

CJ10 Tomidahama Station 富田浜駅
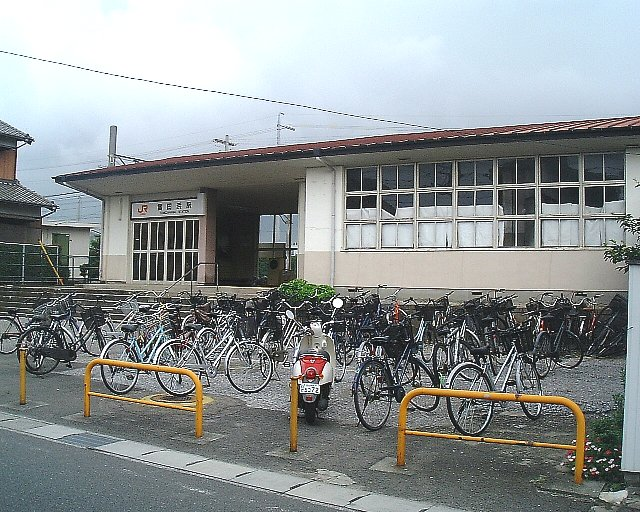
- JR Tomidahama Station

General information
- Location: 20-18 Tomidahama-cho, Yokkaichi-shi, Mie-ken 510-8008; Japan
- Coordinates: 34.9973°N 136.6498°E
- Operator: JR Tōkai
- Line: Kansai Main Line
- Distance: 33.0 km from Nagoya
- Platforms: 2 side platforms
- Connections: Bus terminal

Other information
- Station code: CJ10

History
- Opened: March 1, 1928

Passengers
- FY2019: 216 daily
Location
- Location within Mie Prefecture Location within Japan

Tomidahama Station (富田浜駅, Tomidahama-eki) is a passenger railway station in located in the city of Yokkaichi, Mie Prefecture, Japan, operated by Central Japan Railway Company (JR Tōkai).

== Lines ==
Tomidahama Station is served by the Kansai Main Line, and is 33.0 rail kilometers from the terminus of the line at Nagoya Station.

== Station layout ==
The station consists of two opposed side platforms, connected by a level crossing.The station is unattended.

=== Platform ===
1	■ Kansai Main Line	For Kuwana, Nagoya
2	■ Kansai Main Line	For Yokkaichi, Kameyama

== Adjacent stations ==
«	Service	»
Central Japan Railway Company (JR Central)
Kansai Main Line
Tomida	Local	Yokkaichi
Tomida	Semi Rapid	Yokkaichi
Rapid: Does not stop at this station
Rapid "Mie": Does not stop at this station
Limited Express "Nanki": Does not stop at this station

== Station history ==
Tomidahama Station was opened on July 1, 1907 as the Tomidahama Provisional Signal Stop on the Kansai Railway. Trains stopped here only during the summer season, when the nearby beaches we open for swimmers. The Kansai Railway was nationalized on October 1, 1907 becoming part of the Japanese Government Railways (JGR) and the word “Provisional” was removed from the name on July 1, 1908. It was elevated in status to a full station on March 1, 1928. The JGR became the Japan National Railways (JNR) after World War II. The station has been unattended since October 1, 1970. The station was absorbed into the JR Central network upon the privatization of the JNR on April 1, 1987.

Station numbering was introduced to the section of the Kansai Main Line operated JR Central in March 2018; Tomidahama Station was assigned station number CI10.

== Passenger statistics ==
In fiscal 2019, the station was used by an average of 216 passengers daily (boarding passengers only).

== Surrounding area ==
- Japan National Route 1
- Japan National Route 23
- Yokkaichi Velodrome
- Yokkaichi Dome

== See also ==
- List of railway stations in Japan
