= Asahi Station (Mie) =

Railway station in Asahi, Mie Prefecture, Japan

CJ08 Asahi Station 朝日駅
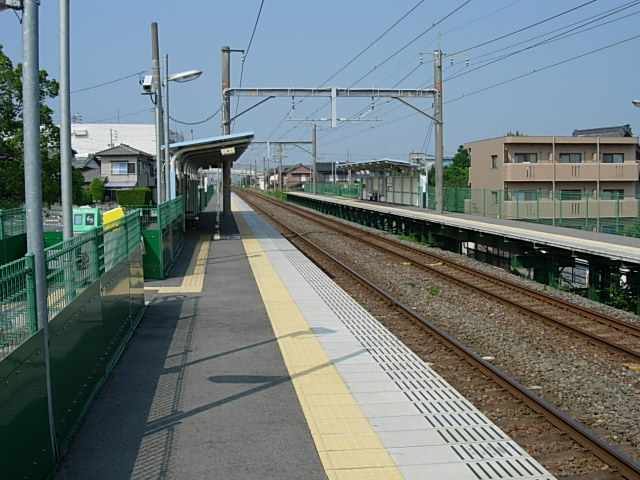
- JR Asahi Station

General information
- Location: 2081 Kaki, Asahi-cho, Mie-gun, Mie-ken 510-8103; Japan
- Coordinates: 35.0338°N 136.6578°E
- Operator: JR Tōkai
- Line: Kansai Main Line
- Distance: 28.5 km from Nagoya
- Platforms: 2 side platforms
- Connections: Bus terminal

Other information
- Station code: CJ08

History
- Opened: March 1, 1928

Passengers
- FY2019: 697 daily
Location
- Location within Mie Prefecture Location within Japan

Asahi Station (朝日駅, Asahi-eki) is a passenger railway station in located in the town of Asahi, Mie Prefecture, Japan, operated by Central Japan Railway Company (JR Tōkai).

== Lines ==
Asahi Station is served by the Kansai Main Line, and is 28.5 rail kilometers from the terminus of the line at Nagoya Station.

== Station layout ==
The station consists of two opposed elevated side platforms. The station is unattended.

=== Platforms ===
1	■ Kansai Main Line	For Yokkaichi, Kameyama
2	■ Kansai Main Line	For Kuwana, Nagoya

== Adjacent stations ==
«	Service	»
JR Central Kansai Main Line
Kuwana	Local	Tomida
Kuwana	Semi Rapid	Tomida
Rapid: Does not stop at this station
Rapid "Mie": Does not stop at this station
Limited Express "Nanki": Does not stop at this station

== Station history ==
Asahi Station was opened on August 8, 1983, as a station on the Japan National Railways (JNR). The station was absorbed into the JR Central network upon the privatization of the JNR on April 1, 1987.

Station numbering was introduced to the section of the Kansai Main Line operated JR Central in March 2018; Asahi Station was assigned station number CI08.

== Passenger statistics ==
In fiscal 2022, the station was used by an average of 673 passengers daily (boarding passengers only).

== Surrounding area ==
- Asahi Town Office
- Toshiba Mie Factory

== See also ==
- List of railway stations in Japan
