= Humanitec Junior College =

Coordinates: 34.9615°N 136.6159°E

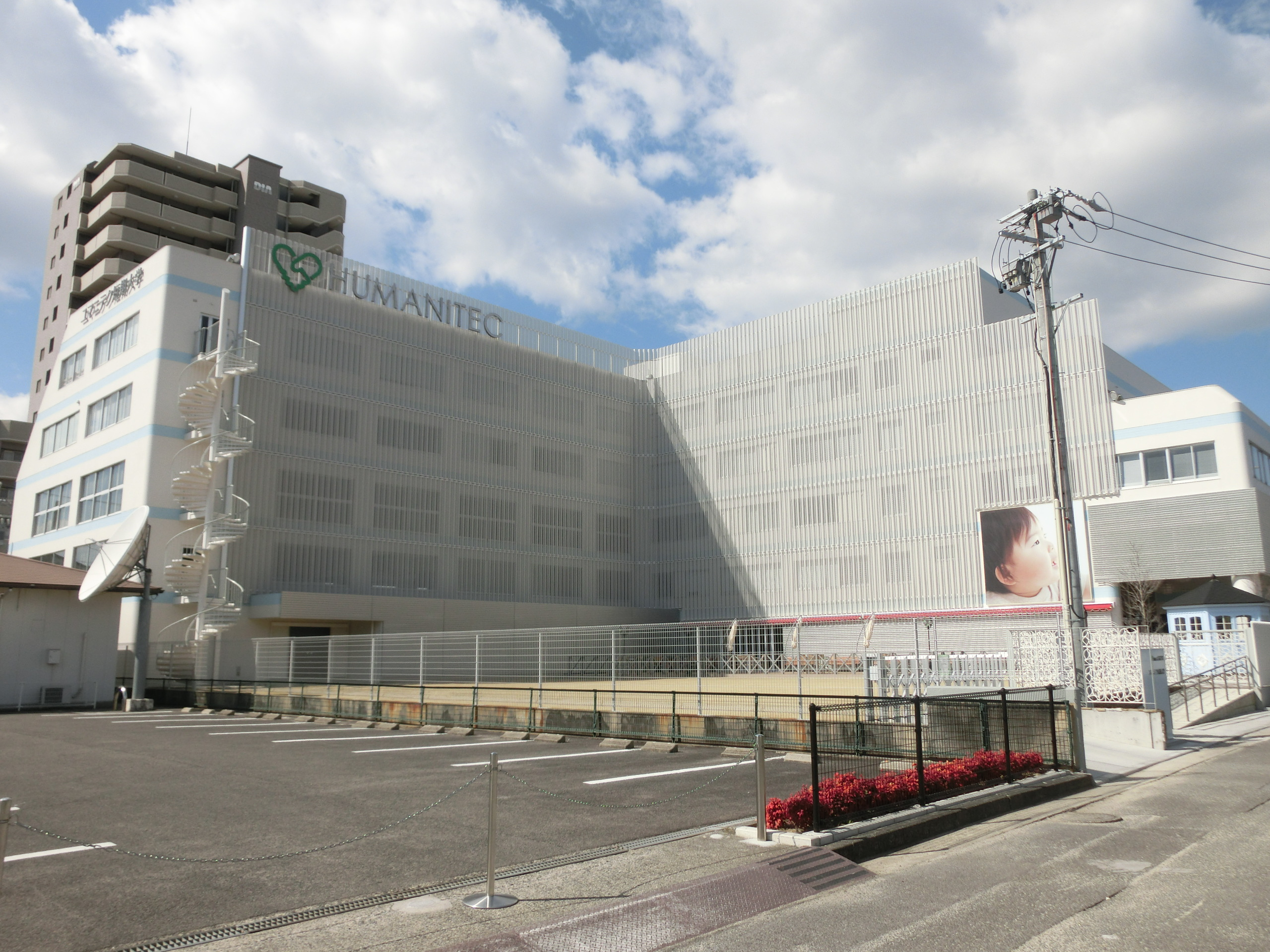
Humanitec Junior College

Humanitec Junior College (ユマニテク短期大学, Yumaniteku Tanki Daigaku) is a private junior college in Yokkaichi, Mie, Japan. Founded as a school for clothing in 1939, it was established as a junior college on October 31, 2016.
