= Tomida Station =

Railway station in Yokkaichi, Mie Prefecture, Japan

CJ09 Tomida Station 富田駅
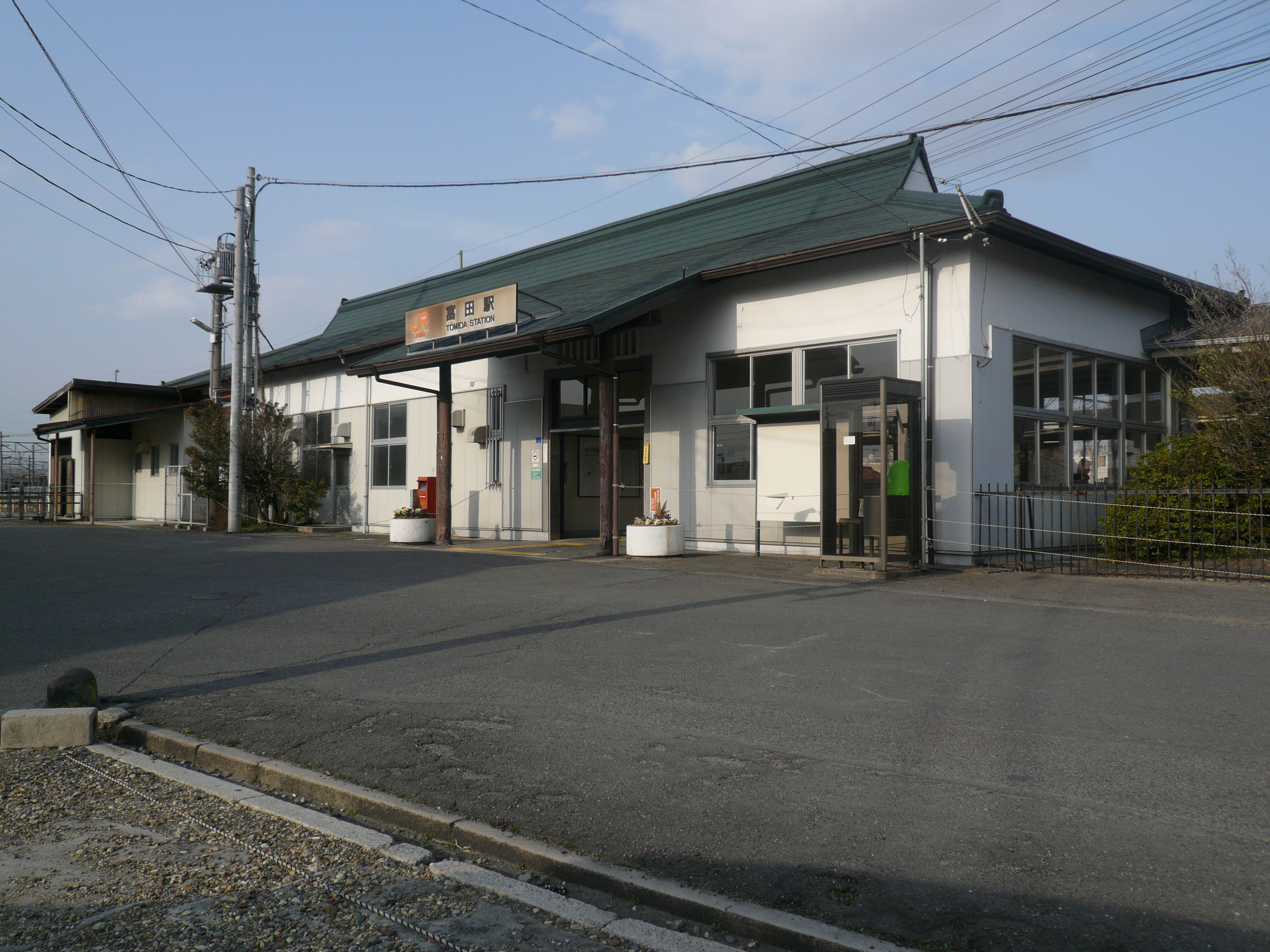
- JR Tomida Station

General information
- Location: 22-12Tomida-cho 3-chome, Yokkaichi-shi, Mie-ken 510-8014; Japan
- Coordinates: 35.007595°N 136.653577°E
- Operator: JR Tōkai
- Line: Kansai Main Line
- Distance: 31.7 km from Nagoya
- Platforms: 1 side + 2 island platform
- Connections: Bus terminal

History
- Opened: July 5, 1894

Passengers
- FY2019: 795 daily
Location
- Location within Mie Prefecture Location within Japan

Track Layout

Tomida Station (富田駅, Tomida-eki) is a passenger railway station in located in the city of Yokkaichi, Mie Prefecture, Japan, operated by Central Japan Railway Company (JR Tōkai). It is also a freight depot for the freight-only Sangi Railway.

== Lines ==
Tomida Station is served by the Kansai Main Line, and is 31.7 rail kilometers from the terminus of the line at Nagoya Station.

== Station layout ==
The station consists of one side platform and one island platform serving three tracks, connected by a footbridge. Another island platform exists for tracks 4 and 5, but is not in use, and is currently serving as a siding for freight cars. The station is unattended.

=== Platforms ===
1	■ Kansai Main Line	For Kuwana, Nagoya
2, 3	■ Kansai Main Line	For Yokkaichi, Kameyama

== Adjacent stations ==
«	Service	»
Central Japan Railway Company (JR Central)
Kansai Main Line
Asahi	Local	Tomidahama
Asahi	Semi Rapid	Tomidahama
Rapid: Does not stop at this station
Rapid "Mie": Does not stop at this station
Limited Express "Nanki": Does not stop at this station
Sangi Railway
Sangi Line (freight line)
Terminus	-	Ōyachi

== Station history ==
Tomida Station was opened on July 5, 1894, as a station on the Kansai Railway. The Kansai Railway was nationalized on October 1, 1907, becoming part of the Japanese Government Railways (JGR) and the Sangi Railway Line connected to this station on July 23, 1931. The JGR became the Japan National Railways (JNR) after World War II. Freight car operations on the JNR were discontinued November 15, 1982. The station was absorbed into the JR Central network upon the privatization of the JNR on April 1, 1987.

Station numbering was introduced to the section of the Kansai Main Line operated JR Central in March 2018; Tomida Station was assigned station number CI09.

== Passenger statistics ==
In fiscal 2019, the station was used by an average of 795 passengers daily (boarding passengers only).

== Surrounding area ==
- Tomida Ichirizuka
- Yokkaichi City Tomida Elementary School
- Sangi Railway Headquarters

== See also ==
- List of railway stations in Japan
