= Banko ware =

Type of Japanese pottery

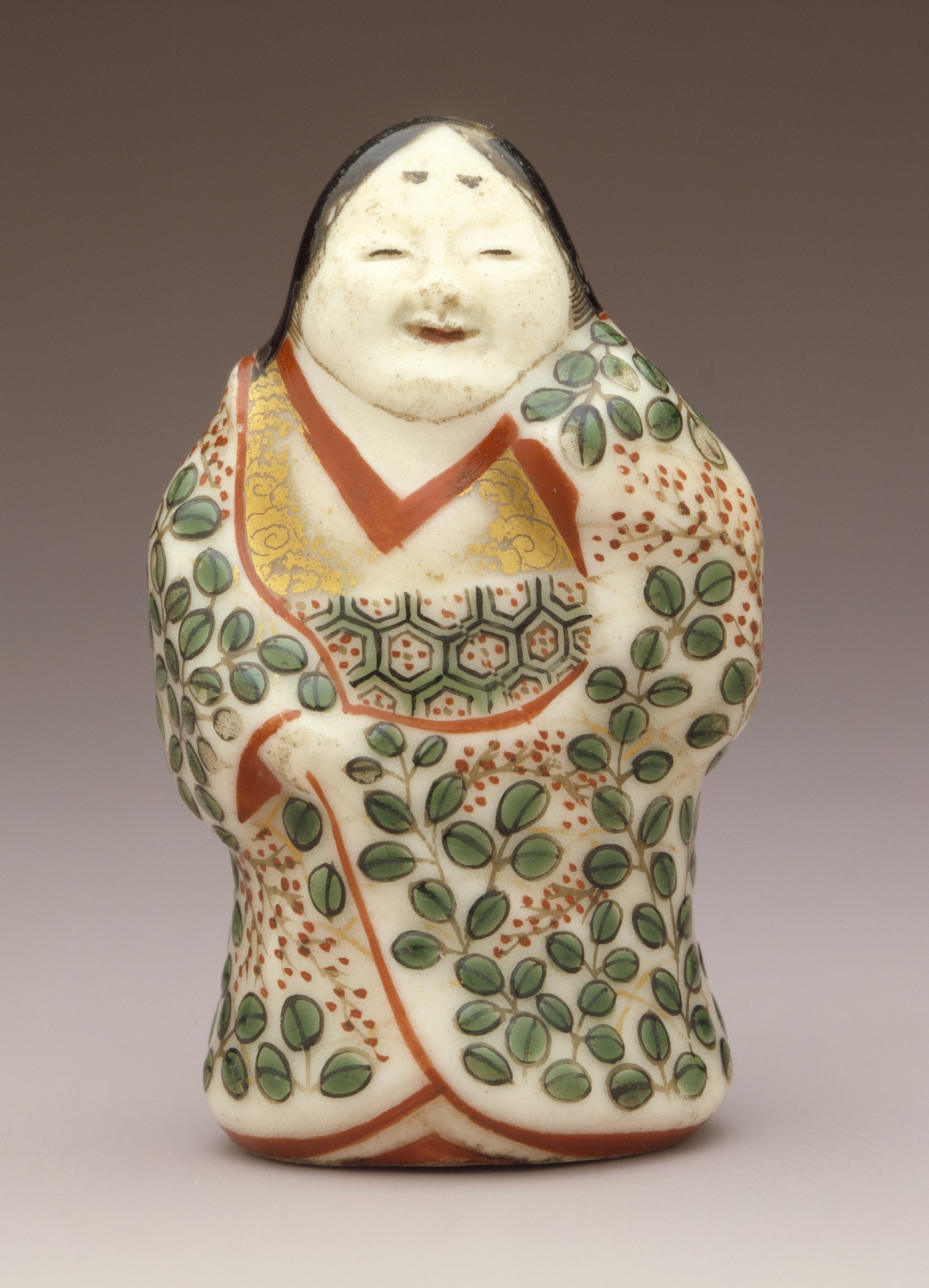
Banko ware Okame female figurine, Edo period, 19th century

Banko ware (萬古焼, Banko-yaki) is a type of Japanese pottery (Stoneware) traditionally from Yokkaichi, Mie. It is therefore also known as Yokkaichi-Banko ware.

It is believed to have originated in the 18th century.

Most products are teacups, teapots, flower vases, and sake vessels.
