= Haijō Edict =

Meiji Era Japanese Edict

The Haijō Edict, also known as Haijōrei, (Japanese: 廃城令, Castle abolishment law or Ordinance to dispose of castles) was an edict enacted on 14 January 1873, mainly concerned with the future usage and possible deconstruction of castles in Japan. This edict was done in conjunction with the Haitō Edict (Sword Abolishment Edict) of 1876, which aimed to abolish the ownership of swords in Japan and the Danpatsurei (Cropped Hair Edict) of 1871, which concerned the relaxing of traditional samurai hairstyles. This decision was based upon survey information provided by castle garrisons and a twelve person survey team to the Grand Council of State (Daijōkan, or 太政官), who then ordered the Zenkoku Jōkaku Sonpai-rei (全国城郭存廃令), literally the "Ordinance for the keeping and disposal of the country's castles" to deal with the future of these castles. The name of the edict was eventually shortened to Haijōrei.

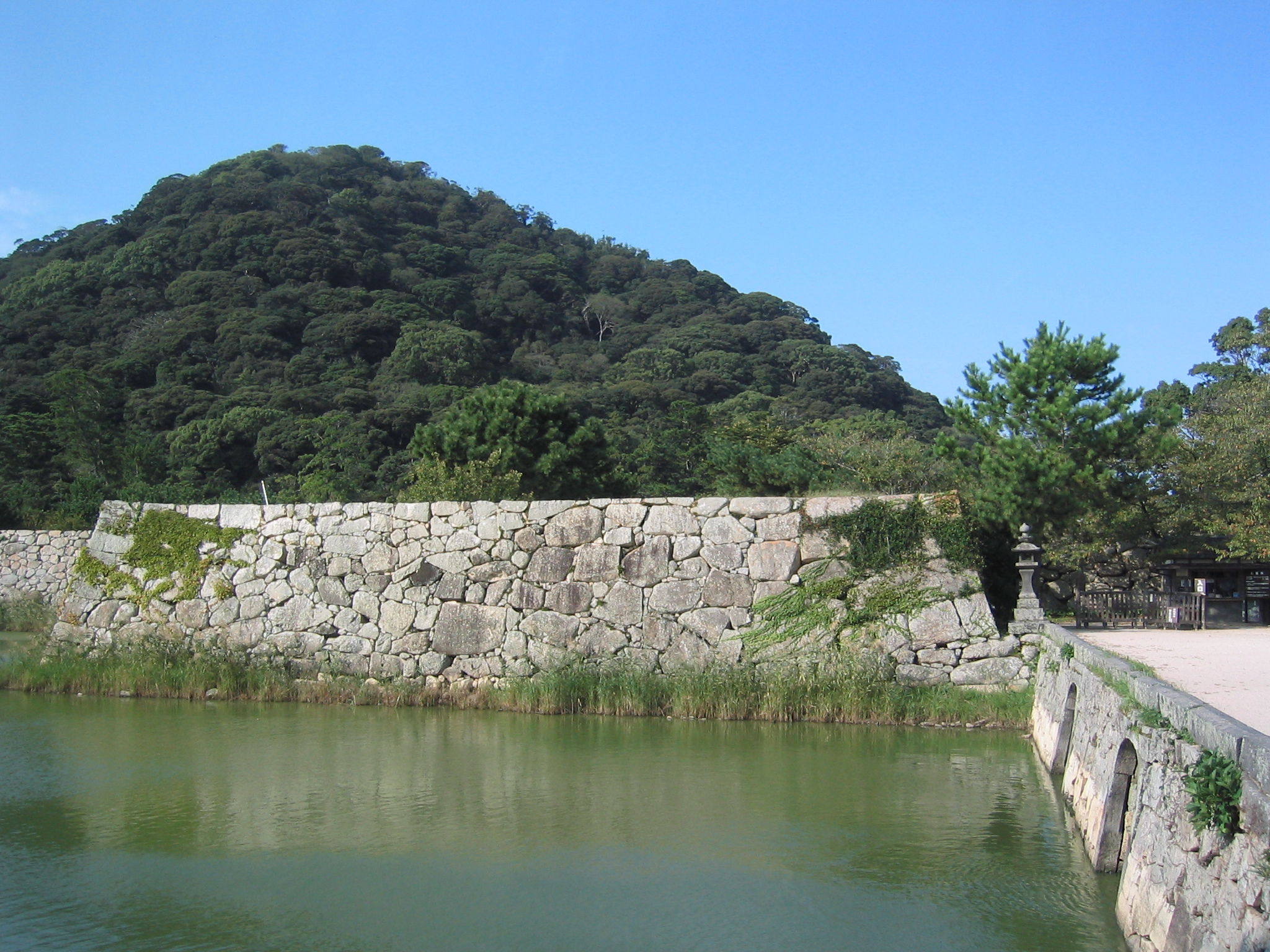
Formerly Hagi Castle and Mount Shizuki. It was initially in possession of the Mōri clan until 1683 and was one of the first castles demolished by the Choshū under Haijōrei in 1873, leaving only the walls and ramparts intact.

== Enactment ==
In 1872, a twelve-member survey team, in cooperation with local military and governmental authorities, visited 200 castles to assess local natural and human data of castle sites, ranging from categories like quality of wells, local provincial wealth, flat land for martial training to forests and water routes in proximity. Based on this information, the government used Haijōrei to categorise these castles into use for military activities or to be left or dismantled.

Haijōrei was the result of the accession of the Emperor Meiji which ushered Japan into an era of rapid modernization and westernization, aiming to remove vestiges of samurai power from the previously reigning Tokugawa Shogunate. By 1875, the Haijōrei justified the dismantling of "at least 100 out of 170 Edo Period castles" present in the country at that time. Further activity was stopped before the 1880s, after the castles were recognized as an iconic part of Japanese heritage and a potential for foreign tourism. The Haijōrei had mainly operational aims regarding castles, namely to better connect the citizens and settlements of Japan under a more unified national body, as opposed to the recent memory of the Tokugawa Han system of individual settlements that were controlled by feudal samurai administrators rather than a centralised government. Many castle sites were demolished or transformed into structures for governmental bodies or purposes, or sites of education – though officially they were under the jurisdiction of the Ministry of Finance for "disposal as its officials saw fit." Whilst Haijōrei did cause some castles to converted into military installations, many of the cases saw demolition or dismantling, Oleg Benesch and Ran Zwigenberg argue that castles existed as a sore reminder of Japan's feudal past, the Meiji government as a result intended to destroy them as a way to signal the new era free of the archaic Tokugawa shogunate and the prior era of feudalism and the Warring States. In government, there was little attachment to these castles due to their feudal history and due to the Meijis government increasing desire to have Japan become a modernised global power, as a result there was not many official voices who spoke up against it.

== Legacy ==
Inuyama and Nagoya castle were early examples of sites being preserved for historical heritage, Machida Hisanari, who was known for his international visits between heritage sites and who was particularly impressed with the Tower of London as a museum had pushed the idea to preserve these two castles to statesman Okuma Shigenobu, who six years afterwards in 1878, authorised legal protection upon the castles of Hikone and Nagoya. However, only a small number of castles were considered at this time, as many castles were still viewed as vestiges of samurai control. The European view of heritage played a large part in staying the destruction of some castles, notably, Max von Brandt intervened on the destruction of Nagoya castle, however, this didn't contribute to a wider policy of preservation until 1878. Despite the damage of the edict, it was plausible that the Meiji governmental bodies didn't neglect the value of cultural heritage, as shown with the Historic Objects Preservation Directive of 1871 and Ancient Shrines and Temple Preservation Law of 1897. Despite this, it took until 1929 under the National Treasures Law to provide legal protection to castles, with 200 of the 299 listed national treasures being found upon castle sites, granting the entire location guaranteed immunity to any similar edicts. The significant parts of around fifty castles were believed to have survived into the Meiji era crackdown on castles, often only superstructures (such as donjons) were targeted by this, therefore moats and ramparts were often left, whereas others became navy and military installations. There were some cases of appreciation by the general public being made clear with castle sites, Vaporis identifies the case of Osaka castle which, was initially under martial jurisdiction, however, was negotiated into a reconstructed keep within the castle that would act as a public park.

Hiroshima is another case study in World War II and the post-war rebuild that saw Hiroshima Castle as a significant landmark to developing and sustaining a military image of the city and subsequently dismantling that image following the end of the war. Before the Japanese surrender, castles were represented as symbols of power and militarism, reflecting the Japanese exploits against Russia in the Russo-Japanese War and China in the First Sino-Japanese War and Second Sino-Japanese War. Afterwards, according to Zwigenberg there was a sharp decrease in this portrayal - instead, showing castles that were devastated by bombs and being left in ruin, marking the end of Japanese militarism.

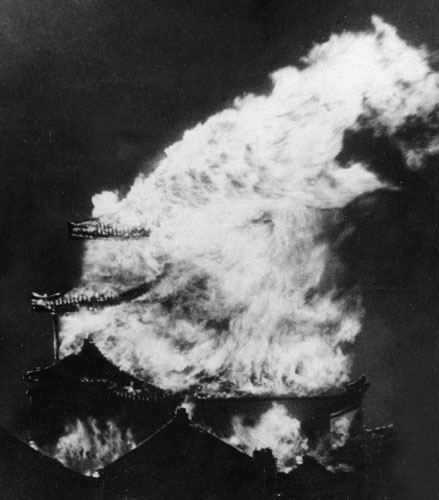
The Allied bombing of Nagoya did significant damage to the castle structures, prompting a rebuild effort utilising modern materials such as concrete.

=== 20th century ===
In the Shōwa era, especially years preceding and following World War II, there was a continued interest in preserving castles. After the war, there was an interest in rebuilding some of the castles damaged or destroyed by the Allied air raids on Japan, such as Okayama Castle and Nagoya castle. Many of these sites are now considered UNESCO World Heritage sites, most notably Shuri Castle, which was destroyed during the Battle of Okinawa in 1945, and Himeji Castle, where the original structures are preserved.

As of 1986, the Japanese government listed a total of 252 castle structures and 88 tower structures to be continually preserved as Important Cultural Properties or National Treasures.

== Affected castles by province ==
Castles specified by the Haijōrei to be abandoned, repurposed or preserved. The fate of these castles may have changed later following the opposition.

(P) means the castle was intended to be preserved, otherwise they were marked for repurposing, dismantling or abandonment.

Aki Province

• Hiroshima (P)

Awa Province

• Tokushima

Awaji Province

• Sumoto

Bingo Province

• Fukuyama

Bungo Province

• Funai, Hiji, Kitsuki, Oka, Saiki, Usuki

Bitchū Province

• Matsuyama, Niwase

Bizen Province

• Okayama(P)

Buzen Province

• Kokura(P), Nakatsu

Chikugo Province

• Kurume, Yanagawa

Chikuzen Province

• Fukuoka(P), Akitsuki

Echigo Province

• Shibata (P), Takada(P) Marumatsu, Yoita

Echizen Province

• Fukui (P), Katsuyama, Maruoka, Ōno

Etchu Province

• Toyama

Izumi Province

• Kishiwada

Harima Province

• Himeji(P), Akashi, Akō, Tatsuno

Hizen Province

• Hasuike, Hirado, Ishida, Kashima, Karatsu, Ōmura, Saga, Shimabara

Higo Province

• Kumamoto(P), Hitoyoshi, Tatsuhiro

Hitachi Province

• Mito(P), Kasama, Matsuoka, Shimodate, Tsuchiura

Hōki Province

• Yonago

Hyūga Province

• Obi(P), Nobeoka, Sadowara, Takanabe

Inaba Province

• Tottori (P)

Iga Province

• Iga Ueno

Ise Province

• Tsu(P), Kameyama, Kanbe, Kuwana, Matsusaka, Nagashima, Tamaru

Iwaki Province

• Shirakawa (P), Hira, Kozutsumi, Miharu, Sakamoto

Iwami Province

• Tsuwano

Iwashiro Province

• Aizu Wakamatsu (P), Fukushima, Funaoka, Kakuda, Nihonmatsu, Shiroishi

Iyo Province

• Matsuyama (P), Uwajima (P), Ōzu

Izumo Province

• Matsue (P)

Kaga Province

• Kanazawa (P), Daishōji

Kai Province

• Koufu (P)

Kazusa Province

• Kururi, Ōtaki, Sanuki (not to be confused with Takamatsu Castle in Sanuki, Shikoku).

Kii Province

• Wakayama(P), Shingū, Tanabe Castle (not to be confused with Tanabe Castle in Tango)

Kouzuke Province

• Takasaka (P), Annaka, Iwabitsu, Numata, Tatebayashi

Mikawa Province

• Yoshida (P), Kariya, Koromo, Nishio, Okazaki, Tahara

Mimasaka Province

• Katsuyama, Tsuyama

Mino Province

• Gujou Hachiman, Iwamura, Kanō, Naegi, Ōgaki

Musashi Province

• Edo(P), Iwatsuki, Oshi

Mutsu Province

• Hachinohe, Shichinohe

Nagato Province

• Kushizaki, Hagi

Ōmi Province

• Hikone (P), Minakuchi, Ōtsu, Zeze

Owari Province

• Nagoya (P), Inuyama

Rikuchuu Province

• Morioka (P), Hanamaki, Ichinoseki, Kanegasaki

Rikuzen Province

• Sendai (P), Iwadeyama, Iwanuma, Takashimizu, Wakuya

Ryūykyū Province

• Shuri

Sanuki Province

• Marugame (P), Takamatsu (P)

Satsuma Province

• Kagoshima (P)

Shimōsa Province

• Sakura (P), Koga, Sekiyado, Yūki

Shimotsuke Province

• Utsunomiya (P), Karasuyama, Kurobane, Ōtawara

Shinano Province

• Iida, Komoro, Matsumoto, Matsuhiro, Takashima, Takatō, Tatsuoka

Suruga Province

• Shizuoka (P), Numazu, Tanaka

Sagami Province

• Odawara (P)

Settsu Province

• Osaka (P), Amagasaki, Takatsuki

Shima Province

• Toba

Suō Province

• Yamaguchi (P), Iwakuni

Tajima Province

• Izushi

Tanba Province

• Sasayama, Fukuchiyama, Sonobe

Tango Province

• Miyazu, Tanabe

Tōtōmi Province

• Hanamatsu, Kakegawa, Yokosuka

Tsushima Province

• Kaneishi

Ugo Province

• Akita (P), Honjō, Kamegasaki, Matsuyama (not to be confused with Matsuyama Iyo, Matsumoto Castle in Ranzan or Bitchū Matsuyama), Ōdate, Yokote

Uzen Province

• Yamagata (P), Kaminoyama, Shinjō, Tsurugaoka, Yonezawa

Wakasa Province

• Obama (not to be confused with Obama castle in Mutsu province)

Yamashiro Province

• Nijō (P), Yodo

Yamato Province

• Kouriyama, Takatori

== See also ==
- Buke Shohatto
- National Treasures of Japan
