= Atsumi =

Atsumi (written: 渥美 or 温海) may refer to:

== People ==
- Atsumi (name)

== Places ==
- Atsumi, Aichi (渥美町, Atsumi-chō), former town in Atsumi District, Aichi Prefecture, Japan
- Atsumi District, Aichi (渥美郡, Atsumi-gun), former district in Aichi Prefecture, Japan
- Atsumi Peninsula (渥美半島, Atsumi Hantō), peninsula in Aichi Prefecture, Japan
- Atsumi, Yamagata (温海町, Atsumi-machi), former town in Nishitagawa District, Yamagata Prefecture, Japan
