= Hirotaka =

- Gender: Male

Origin
- Origin: Japanese
- Meaning: Different meanings depending on the kanji used

Hirotaka (written: 洋孝, 宏孝, 宏考, 宏高, 広高, 広隆, 広孝, 弘貴, 弘隆, 大貴, 大剛, 仁貴, 啓貴, 弘高, 浩貴, 皓敬, 絋孝, 博孝 or 寛孝) is a masculine Japanese given name. Notable people with the name include:

- Hirotaka Akamatsu (赤松 広隆; born 1948), Japanese politician
- Hirotaka Chiba (千葉 皓敬; born 1992), Japanese actor and voice actor
- Hirotaka Egusa (江草 仁貴; born 1980), Japanese baseball player
- Honda Hirotaka (本多 広孝; 1528–1598), Japanese samurai
- Hirotaka Ishihara (石原 宏高; born 1964), Japanese politician
- Hirotaka Kajiura (梶浦 宏孝; born 1995), Japanese shogi player
- Hirotaka Koishi (小石 博孝; born 1993), Japanese baseball player
- Hirotaka Mita (三田 啓貴; born 1990), Japanese footballer
- Hirotaka Nozuki (野月 浩貴; born 1973), Japanese shogi player
- Hirotaka Okada (岡田 弘隆; born 1967), Japanese judoka
- Hirotaka Sugawara (菅原 寛孝; born 1938), Japanese physicist
- Hirotaka Suzuoki (鈴置 洋孝; 1950–2006), Japanese actor and voice actor
- Terazawa Hirotaka (寺沢 広高; 1563–1633), Japanese daimyō
- Hirotaka Takeuchi (竹内 弘高; born 1946), Japanese businessman and academic
- Hirotaka Tameda (為田 大貴; born 1993), Japanese footballer
- Hirotaka Uchibayashi (内林 広高; born 1983), Japanese footballer
- Hirotaka Usui (臼井 弘貴; born 1980), Japanese football manager
- Hirotaka Yokoi (横井 宏考; born 1978), Japanese mixed martial artist
- Hirotaka Yoshii (吉井 裕鷹; born 1998), Japanese basketballer
- Hirotaka Zendana (膳棚 大剛; born 1993), Japanese field hockey player
