= Tahara =

Tahara may refer to:

== Religion ==
- Tumah and taharah, the state of being ritually impure and pure in Judaism
  - Tohorot, the sixth and last order of the Mishnah
  - Tahara, a stage of bereavement in Judaism
- Taharah, the aspect of ritual purity in Islam

== Places ==
- Tahara, Victoria, a locality in Australia
- Tahara, Aichi, a city in Japan
  - Tahara Castle
  - Tahara Domain
- Tahara Station, a train station in Kasai, Japan

== People ==
- Aruno Tahara (born 1949), Japanese voice actor
- Etsuko Tahara, Japanese footballer
- Kanako Tahara (born 1994), Japanese actress and singer
- Katsuya Tahara (born 1972), Japanese snowboarder
- Keiichi Tahara (1951–2017), Japanese photographer
- Kenichi Tahara (born 1969), Japanese musician
- Mutsuo Tahara (1943–2016), Japanese judge
- Noboru Tahara (born 1983), Japanese mixed martial artist
- Seiji Tahara (born 1989), Japanese baseball player
- Soichiro Tahara (born 1934), Japanese journalist
- Toshihiko Tahara (born 1961), Japanese singer
- Yutaka Tahara (born 1982), Japanese footballer

== Other uses ==
- Tahara (film), a 2020 American film
- Tahara (leafhopper), an insect genus in the subfamily Coelidiinae

== See also ==
- Taharah (disambiguation)
