= Tahara Castle =

Japanese historical building

- 田原城
- Tahara, Aichi Prefecture, Japan
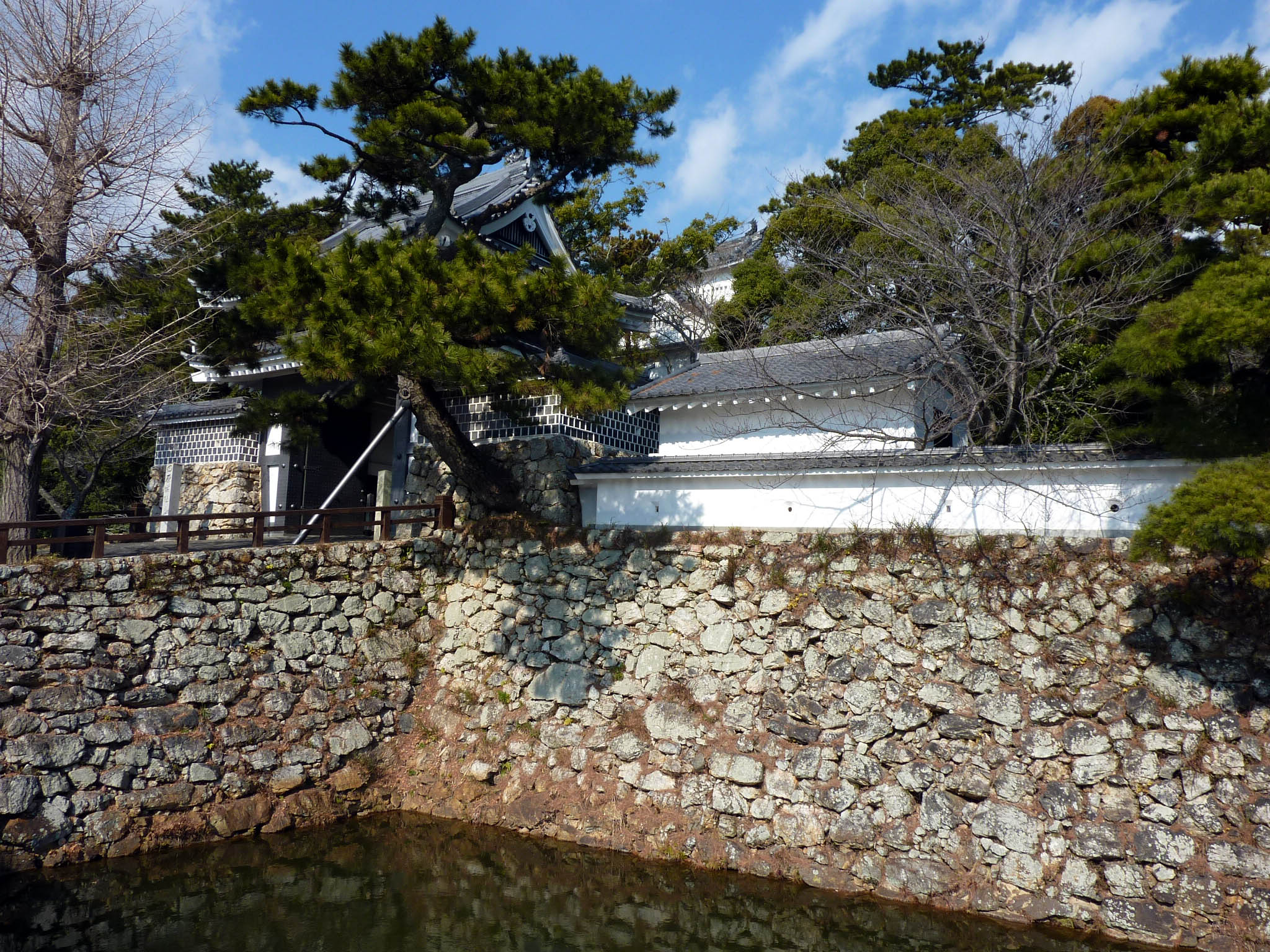
- Reconstructed Sakura-mon and original moats of Tahara Castle

Site information
- Type: flatland-style Japanese castle
- Owner: reconstructed 1990
- Open to the public: yes

Location
- Coordinates: 34°40′24.58″N 137°16′11.02″E

Site history
- Built: 1480
- Built by: Toda Munemitsu
- In use: Edo period
- Demolished: 1872

Tahara Castle (田原城, Tahara-jō) is a Japanese castle located in Tahara, southern Aichi Prefecture, Japan. At the end of the Edo period, Tahara Castle was home to the Miyake clan, daimyō of the 12,000 koku Tahara Domain.

== History ==
Tahara Castle is located on a small hill in the city of Tahara, near the root of the Atsumi Peninsula extending into Mikawa Bay. The location was formerly surrounded by inlets, which enhanced its defensive position, and its ability to extend control over shipping in the area.

In 1480, Toda Munemitsu (1439–1508), virtually independent warlord of the Atsumi Peninsula during the Sengoku Period, erected the predecessor of Tahara Castle. Threatened by the growing power of the Matsudaira clan under Matsudaira Kiyoyasu to the north, the Toda pledged loyalty to the powerful Imagawa clan based in Suruga. When Matsudaira Hirotada was forced to send his son, the future Tokugawa Ieyasu to Sunpu as a hostage to the Imagawa, he turned to the Toda clan for assistance, but the Toda sent Ieyasu as a hostage to Oda Nobunaga instead, in exchange for a monetary payment. The outraged Imagawa attacked and captured Tahara Castle in 1550. After the defeat of the Imagawa at the Battle of Okehazama 10 years later, Tahara Castle came under the control of the Tokugawa, who used it as a subsidiary fortification to Toyohashi Castle. From 1565 to 1595, Honda Hirotaka and Honda Yasushige served as castellans.

Following the Battle of Odawara in 1590, Toyotomi Hideyoshi assigned the Kantō region to Tokugawa Ieyasu and the Toda were dispossessed of their holdings, which were given to Hideyoshi's vassal, Igi Tadatsugu, who rebuilt the moats and stonework.

Following the establishment of the Tokugawa shogunate, Toda Katatsugu was raised back from hatamoto status to a 10,000 koku daimyō, and allowed to return to Tahara Castle, which was now the administrative center of the newly created Tahara feudal domain in 1601. In 1664, his son Toda Tadamasa was transferred to Amakusa Domain in Bungo Province with an increase in revenues to 21,000 koku and Tahara Domain was reassigned to the Miyake clan, who remained in residence until the Meiji Restoration.

Little remains of the original castle aside from portions of the moats and stonework, as all castle buildings were destroyed in 1872 in accordance with the new Meiji government. Within the central keep of the former castle is a Shinto shrine to the ancestors of the Miyake clan, and another dedicated to the famed local scholar Watanabe Kazan, as well as the local Tahara City Museum. When the Tahara City Museum was reconstructed in 1990, a faux yagura and gate were reconstructed.

== Literature ==
- De Lange, William (2021). An Encyclopedia of Japanese Castles. Groningen: Toyo Press. pp. 600 pages. ISBN 978-9492722300.
- Schmorleitz, Morton S. (1974). Castles in Japan. Tokyo: Charles E. Tuttle Co. pp. 144–145. ISBN 0-8048-1102-4.
- Motoo, Hinago (1986). Japanese Castles. Tokyo: Kodansha. p. 200 pages. ISBN 0-87011-766-1.
- Mitchelhill, Jennifer (2004). Castles of the Samurai: Power and Beauty. Tokyo: Kodansha. p. 112 pages. ISBN 4-7700-2954-3.
- Turnbull, Stephen (2003). Japanese Castles 1540-1640. Osprey Publishing. p. 64 pages. ISBN 1-84176-429-9.
