= Okazaki Domain =

Japanese domain

Okazaki Domain 岡崎藩
- Domain of Japan
- 1601–1871
- Mon of the Honda clan

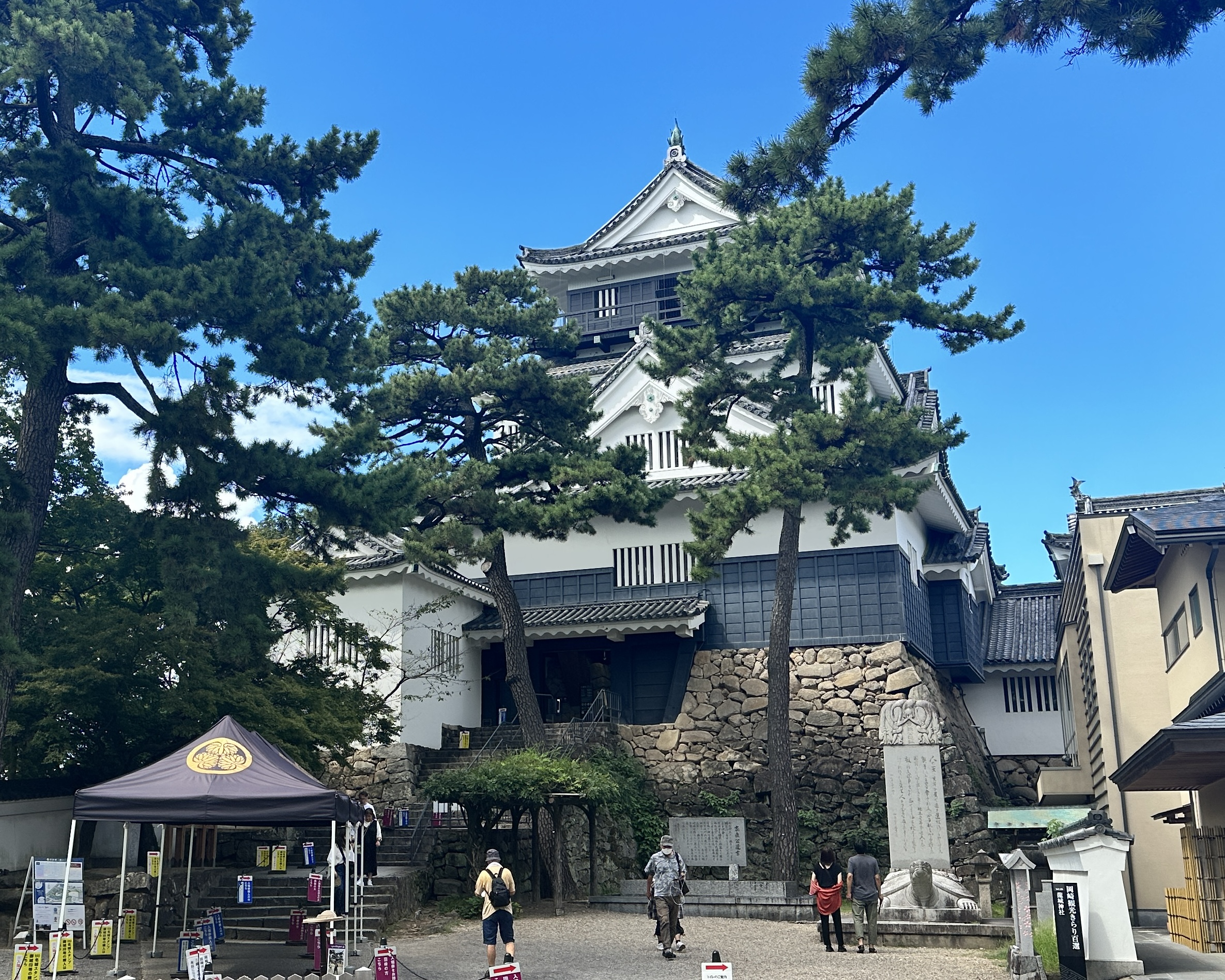
- Reconstructed castle tower of Okazaki Castle in 2023
- Capital: Okazaki Castle
- Government
  - Type: Daimyō
- Daimyō
  - 1601-1611: Honda Yasushige (first)
  - 1869-1871: Honda Tadanao (last)
- Historical era: Edo period
  - Established: 1601
  - Disestablished: 1871
- Today part of: Aichi Prefecture

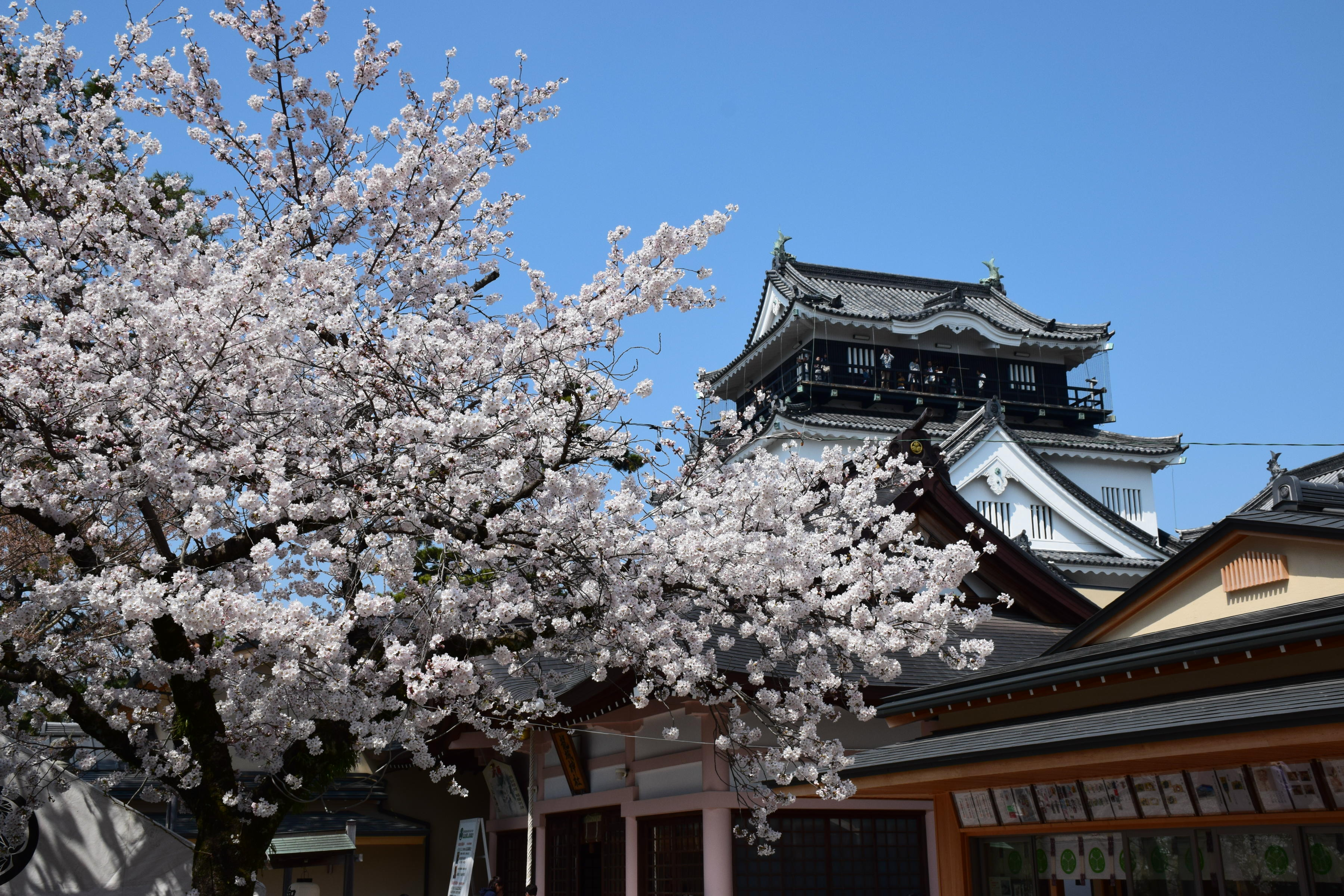
Okazaki Castle, administrative center of Okazaki Domain

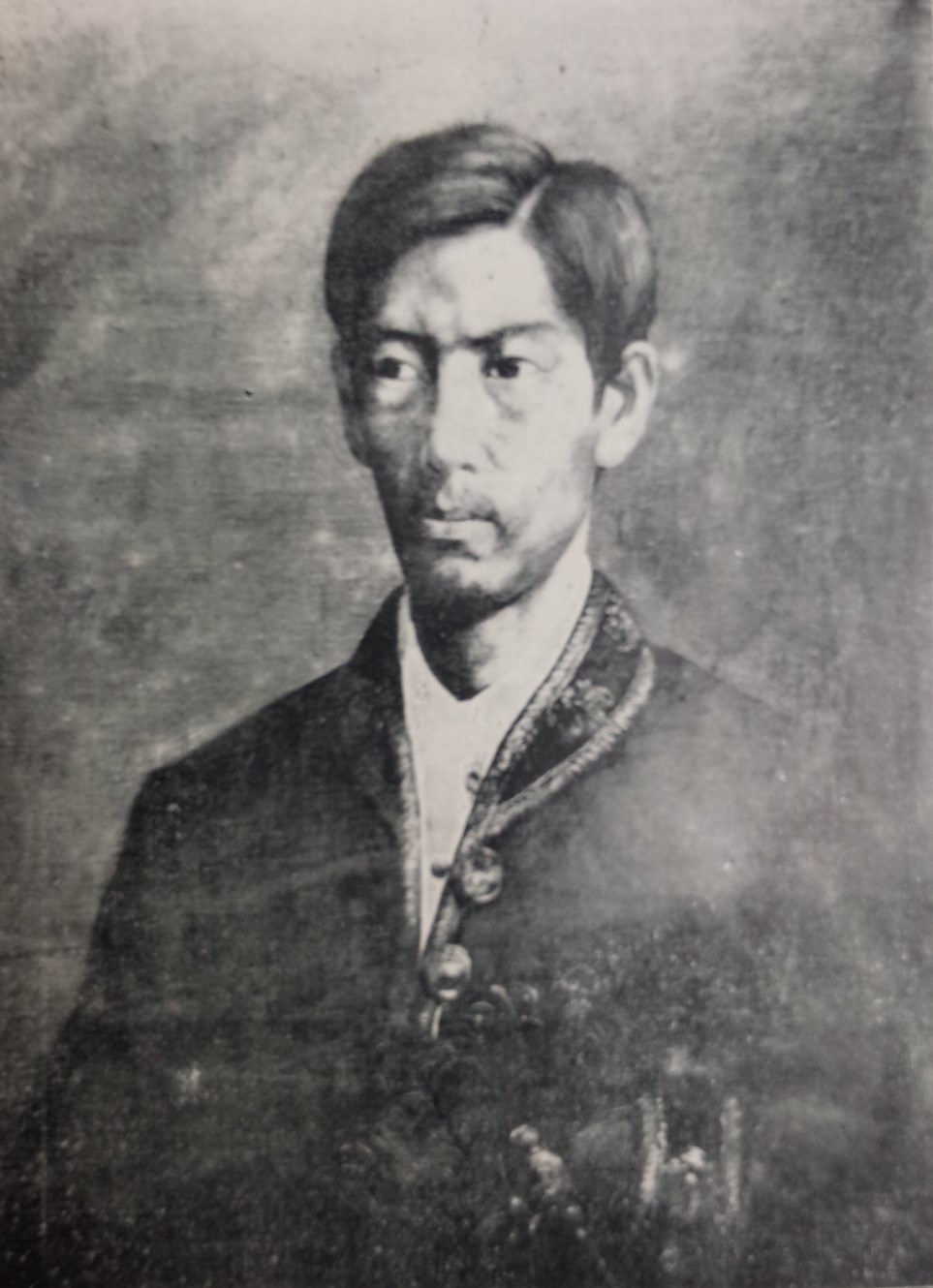
Honda Tadanao, final daimyo of Okazaki Domain

The Okazaki Domain encompassed the Mikawa Province, which is situated in what is now the eastern part of Aichi Prefecture. The administrative center of the domain was established within the walls of the historic Okazaki Castle. Due to its associations with Tokugawa Ieyasu, who was born in Okazaki Castle, the domain had a prestige greater than in its nominal valuation based on rice tax revenues.

== History ==
Matsudaira Kiyoyasu took control of the area around Okazaki in 1524 and built Okazaki Castle, where his grandson Tokugawa Ieyasu was born in 1542. After a defeat by the Imagawa clan in 1549, Ieyasu was taken hostage to Sunpu, but reclaimed Okazaki after the Battle of Okehazama in 1560. Oda Nobunaga's execution of Matsudaira Nobuyasu in 1579 led to the Honda clan taking over Okazaki Castle, with Tanaka Yoshimasa enhancing its defenses. The Tokugawa shogunate established Okazaki Domain, with the Honda clan, Mizuno clan and Matsudaira clan, clans governing the castle until the Meiji Restoration. In 1869, Honda Tadanao surrendered Okazaki Domain to the Meiji government, leading to its incorporation into Nukata Prefecture and later Aichi Prefecture in 1872.

== List of daimyō ==
#	Name	Tenure	Courtesy title	Court Rank	kokudaka
Honda clan (Fudai daimyo) 1601–1645
1	Honda Yasushige (本多康)	1601 – 1611	Bungo-no-kami (豊後守)	Junior 5th Rank Lower Grade (従五位下)	50,000 koku
2	Honda Yasunori (本多康紀)	1611 – 1623	Bungo-no-kami (豊後守)	Junior 5th Rank Lower Grade (従五位下)	50,000 koku
3	Honda Tadatoshi (本多忠利)	1623 – 1645	Ise-no-kami (伊勢守)	Junior 5th Rank Lower Grade (従五位下)	50,000 —-> 56,500 koku
4	Honda Toshinaga (本多利長)	1645	Echizen-no-kami (越前守)	Junior 5th Rank Lower Grade (従五位下)	56,500 -> 50,000 koku
Mizuno clan (fudai) 1645–1762
1	Mizuno Tadayoshi (水野忠善)	1645 - 1676	Daikenmotsu (大監物)	Junior 5th Rank Lower Grade (従五位下)	50,000 koku
2	Mizuno Tadaharu (水野忠春)	1676 – 1692	Emon-no-suke (右衛門佐)	Junior 5th Rank Lower Grade (従五位下)	50,000 koku
3	Mizuno Tadamitsu (水野忠盈)	1692 – 1699	Buzen-no-kami (豊前守)	Junior 5th Rank Lower Grade (従五位下)	50,000 koku
4	Mizuno Tadayuki (水野忠之)	1699 – 1730	Izumi-no-kami (和泉守), Jiju (侍従)	Junior 4th Rank Lower Grade (従四位下)	50,000 -–> 60,000 koku
5	Mizuno Tadateru (水野忠輝)	1730 – 1737	Daikenmotsu (大監物)	Junior 5th Rank Lower Grade (従五位下)	50,000 koku
6	Mizuno Tadatoki (水野忠辰)	1737 – 1752	Daikenmotsu (大監物)	Junior 5th Rank Lower Grade (従五位下)	50,000 koku
7	Mizuno Tadato (水野忠任)	1752 – 1762	Izumi-no-kami (和泉守)	Junior 5th Rank Lower Grade (従五位下)	50,000 koku
Matsudaira (Matsui) clan (fudai) |1762–1769
1	Matsudaira Yasutomi (松平(松井)康福)	1762 – 1769	Suo-no-kami (周防守), Jiju (侍従)	Junior 4th Rank Lower Grade (従四位下)	50,400 koku
Honda clan (fudai) 1769–1871
1	Honda Tadatoshi (本多忠粛)	1769 – 1777	Nakatsukasa-taifu (中務大輔)	Junior 5th Rank Lower Grade (従五位下)	50,000 koku
2	Honda Tasatsune (本多忠典)	1777 – 1790	Nakatsukasa-taifu (中務大輔)	Junior 5th Rank Lower Grade(従五位下)	50,000 koku
3	Honda Tadaaki (本多忠顕)	1790 – 1821	Nakatsukasa-taifu (中務大輔)	Junior 5th Rank Lower Grade (従五位下)	50,000 koku
4	Honda Tadataka (本多忠考)	1821 – 1835	Nakatsukasa-taifu (中務大輔)	Junior 5th Rank Lower Grade (従五位下)	50,000 koku
5	Honda Tadamoto (本多忠民)	1835 – 1869	Mino-no-kami (美濃守), Jiju (侍従)	Junior 5th Rank Lower Grade (従五位下)	50,000 koku
6	Honda Tadanao (本多忠直)	1869 – 1871	Nakatsukasa-taifu (中務大輔)	Junior 5th Rank Lower Grade (従五位下)	50,000 koku
