= Atsumi District =

Former district in Aichi prefecture, Japan

Atsumi (渥美郡, Atsumi-gun) was a district located in southern Aichi Prefecture, Japan, located on the Atsumi Peninsula in Mikawa Bay.

As a result of various consolidations and mergers of municipalities, the district was incorporated into the cities of Toyohashi and Tahara in 2005.

As of 2004 (the last data available before its dissolution), the district had an estimated population of 21,657 with a density of 263.5 persons per km^{2}. Its total area was 82.18 km^{2}.

== Municipalities ==
Prior to its dissolution, the district consisted of only one town:

- Atsumi (Note: Classified as a town.)

== History ==
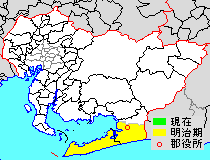
Map showing original extent of Atsumi District in Aichi Prefecture: * yellow - areas formerly within the district borders during the early Meiji period

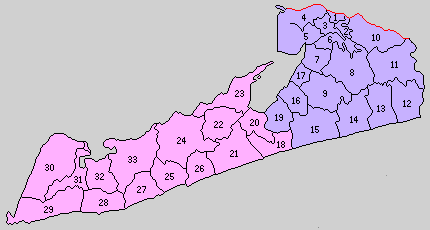
Colored areas are in this district.

Atsumi-gun is one of the ancient counties of southern Mikawa Province and is mentioned in Nara period records. Due to its geographic proximity to Ise Province, during the Nara and Heian period, large portions of its lands were managed as shōen controlled by Ise Shrine or under the direct control of the Imperial family. During the Muromachi period, the Isshiki clan rose to prominence, but after the Ōnin War were displaced by the Toda clan, who built Tahara Castle. However, in the Sengoku period, the Doi were challenged by the rising power of the Makino clan and Matsudaira clan to the north, and the Imagawa clan to the east. In the Edo period, under the Tokugawa shogunate, most of the district was administered by the feudal domains of Tahara Domain, Yoshida Domain and Hatagamura Domain. After the Meiji Restoration, the area was merged into Aichi Prefecture.

=== District Timeline ===
In the cadastral reforms of the early Meiji period, on October 1, 1889, Atsumi District was divided into the town of Toyohashi and 32 villages (35 villages by 1891 due to reorganization). The village of Tahara was raised to town status on October 3, 1892, followed by the village of Okawa on June 23, 1893, and the village of Fukue on February 22, 1897. In a round of consolidation in May 1906, the town of Fukagawa was created, and the remaining number of villages was reduced from 33 to 10. Toyohashi was also raised to city status on August 1, 1906. Toyohashi annexed two neighboring villages in 1932, leaving the district with three towns and eight villages.

After World War II, in another round of consolidation in 1955, the town of Futagawa was merged into the city of Toyohashi; and the town of Atsumi was created. With the elevation of the village of Akabane to town status on November 1, 1958, the district was left with only three towns.

=== Recent mergers ===
- On August 20, 2003 - The town of Tahara absorbed the town of Akabane to form the city of Tahara.
- On October 1, 2005 - The town of Atsumi was merged into the expanded city of Tahara. Therefore, Atsumi District was dissolved as a result of this merger.

== See also ==
- List of dissolved districts of Japan
