= Okazaki Castle =

Feudal-era castle in Okazaki, Aichi Prefecture, Japan

Coordinates: 34°57′23″N 137°09′32″E

Okazaki Castle 岡崎城
- Okazaki, Aichi Prefecture, Japan
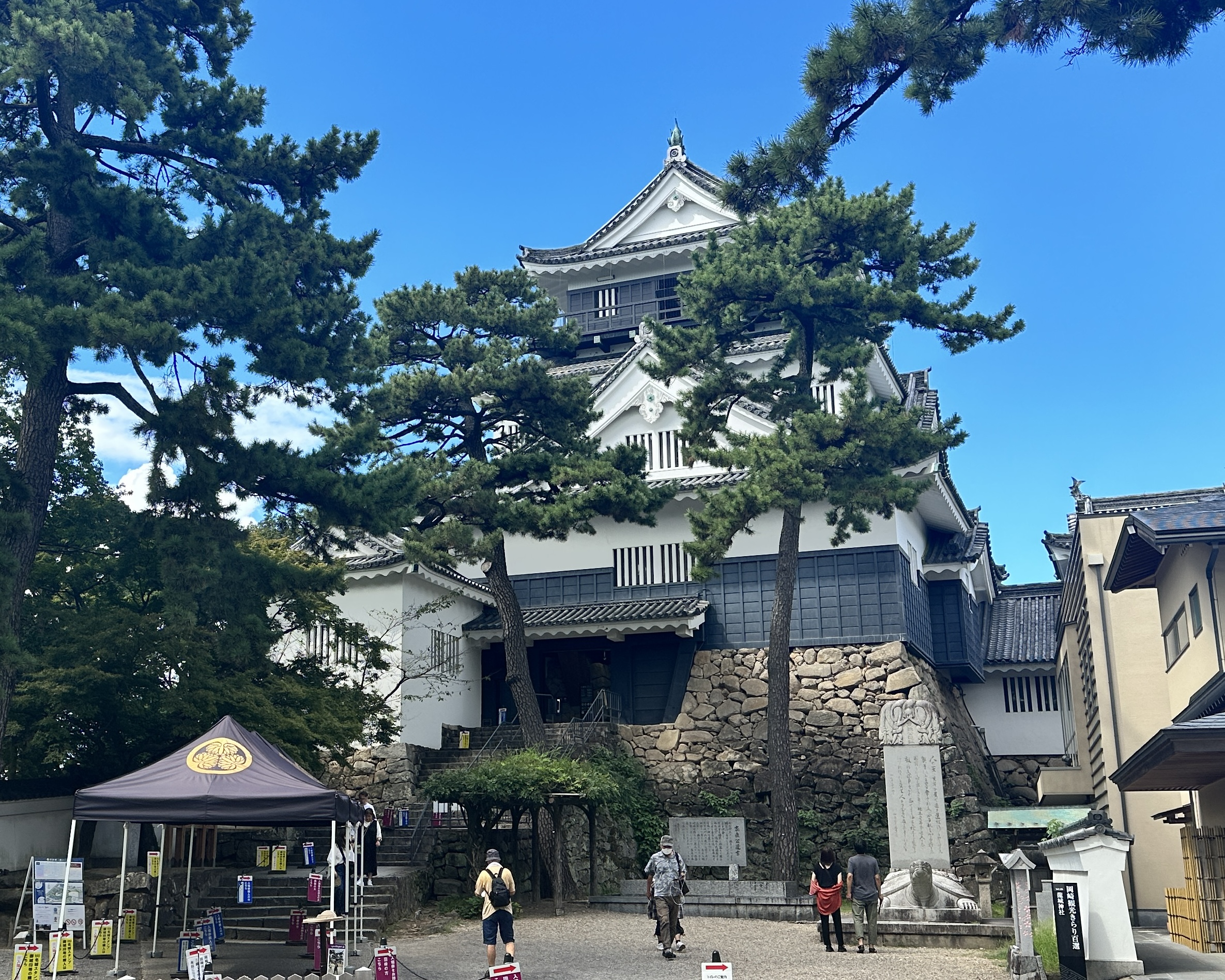
- The reconstructed castle tower restored in 1959

Site information
- Type: hilltop-style Japanese castle
- Owner: reconstructed 1982
- Open to the public: yes

Location

Site history
- Built: 1455, 1542
- Built by: Saigo Tsugiyori; Matsudaira Kiyoyasu
- In use: Edo period
- Demolished: 1871

Okazaki Castle (岡崎城, Okazaki-jō) is a Japanese castle located in Okazaki, Aichi Prefecture, Japan. At the end of the Edo period, Okazaki Castle was home to the Honda clan, daimyō of Okazaki Domain, but the castle is better known for its association with Tokugawa Ieyasu and the Tokugawa clan. The castle was also known as "Tatsu-jō" (龍城).

== History ==
Saigo Tsugiyori built an earthen-walled fortification in the Myodaiji area of Okazaki, near the present castle in 1455. Matsudaira Kiyoyasu, after gaining control of the area in 1524, demolished the old fortification and built Okazaki Castle on its present location. His famous grandson Matsudaira Motoyasu (later named Tokugawa Ieyasu) was born here on January 31, 1543. The Matsudaira were defeated by the Imagawa clan in 1549, and Ieyasu was taken to Sunpu Castle as a hostage. Following the defeat of the Imagawa at the Battle of Okehazama, Ieyasu regained possession of the castle in 1560 and left his eldest son Matsudaira Nobuyasu in charge when he moved to Hamamatsu Castle in 1570. After Oda Nobunaga ordered Nobuyasu’s death in 1579, the Honda clan served as castellans. Following the relocation of the Tokugawa to Edo after the Battle of Odawara by Toyotomi Hideyoshi, the castle was given to Tanaka Yoshimasa, who substantially improved on its fortifications, expanded the castle town and developed Okazaki-juku on the Tōkaidō.

Following the creation of the Tokugawa shogunate, Okazaki Domain was created, and Ieyasu’s close retainer Honda Yasushige was assigned possession of the castle. A three-story donjon was completed in 1617. The Honda were replaced by the Mizuno clan from 1645-1762, and the Matsudaira (Matsui) clan from 1762-1769. In 1769, a branch of the Honda clan returned to Okazaki, and governed until the Meiji Restoration.

In 1869, the final daimyō of Okazaki Domain, Honda Tadanao, surrendered Okazaki Castle to the new Meiji government. With the abolition of the han system in 1871, Okazaki Domain became part of Nukata Prefecture, with Okazaki Castle used as the prefectural headquarters. However, Nukata Prefecture was merged into Aichi Prefecture in 1872, and the capital of the prefecture was moved to Nagoya. In accordance with government directives in 1873, the castle was demolished, and most of its land sold off to private individuals.

The current donjon was reconstructed in 1959 to boost local tourism. In 2006, it was proclaimed one of the 100 Fine Castles of Japan. The ferroconcrete structure has three roofs and five interior floors, and contains exhibits of artifacts from the original castle, Japanese swords, armor and dioramas illustrating local history. The main gate of the castle was reconstructed in 1993, and the east corner yagura in 2010.

In 2007, construction work near the castle revealed stonework from the castle’s outer baileys, lending evidence to the claim that Okazaki Castle was once the fourth largest in Japan.

The remaining castle grounds are now a park, with a museum dedicated to the life of Tokugawa Ieyasu and the Mikawa samurai, teahouses, a Noh theater, a small clock tower with traditional karakuri puppets, as well as the reconstructed castle buildings and the remaining stonework and moats of the castle. The park is also renowned as a famous site for viewing cherry blossoms, wisteria and azalea.

== Pictures ==
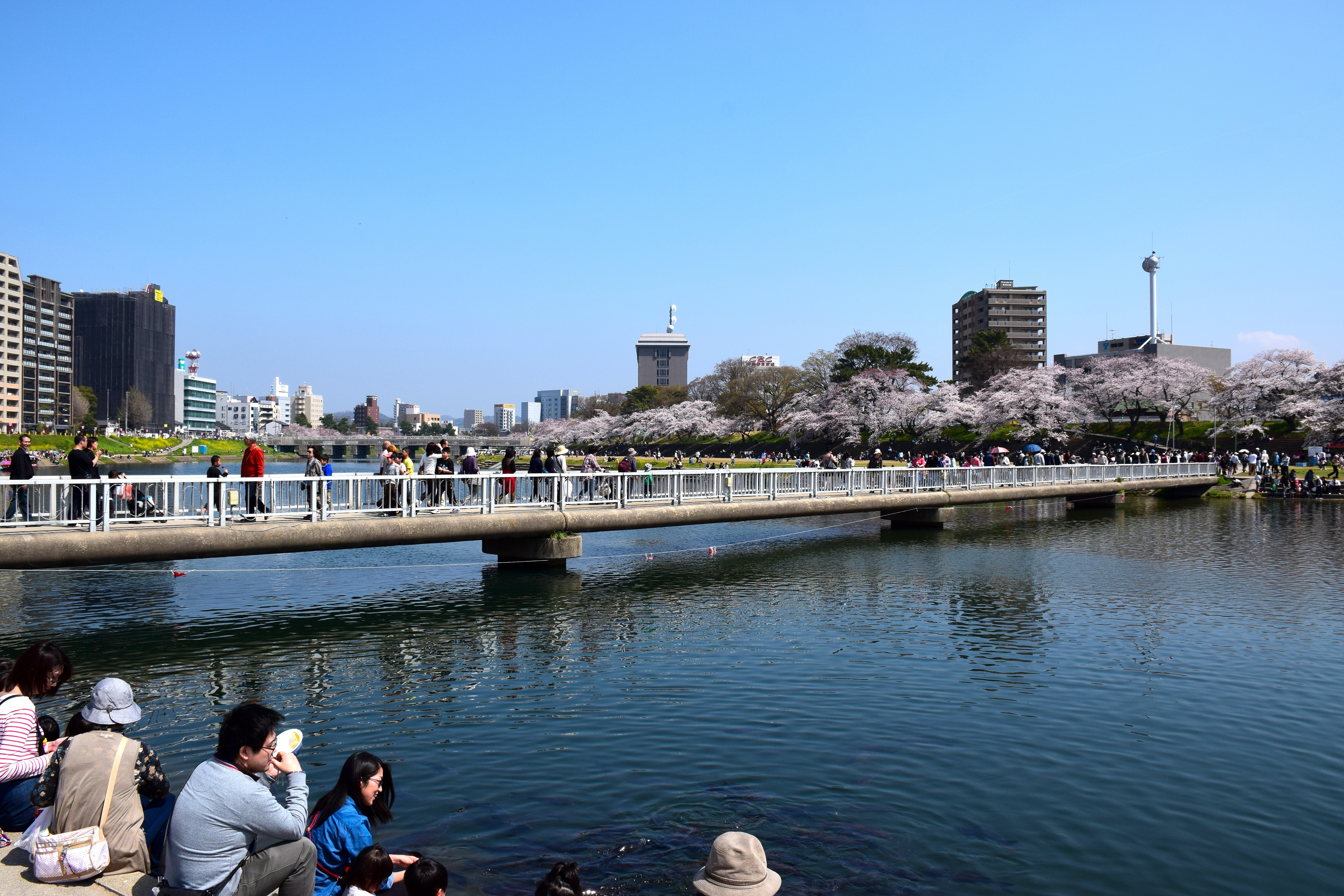
Okazaki Flower Festival

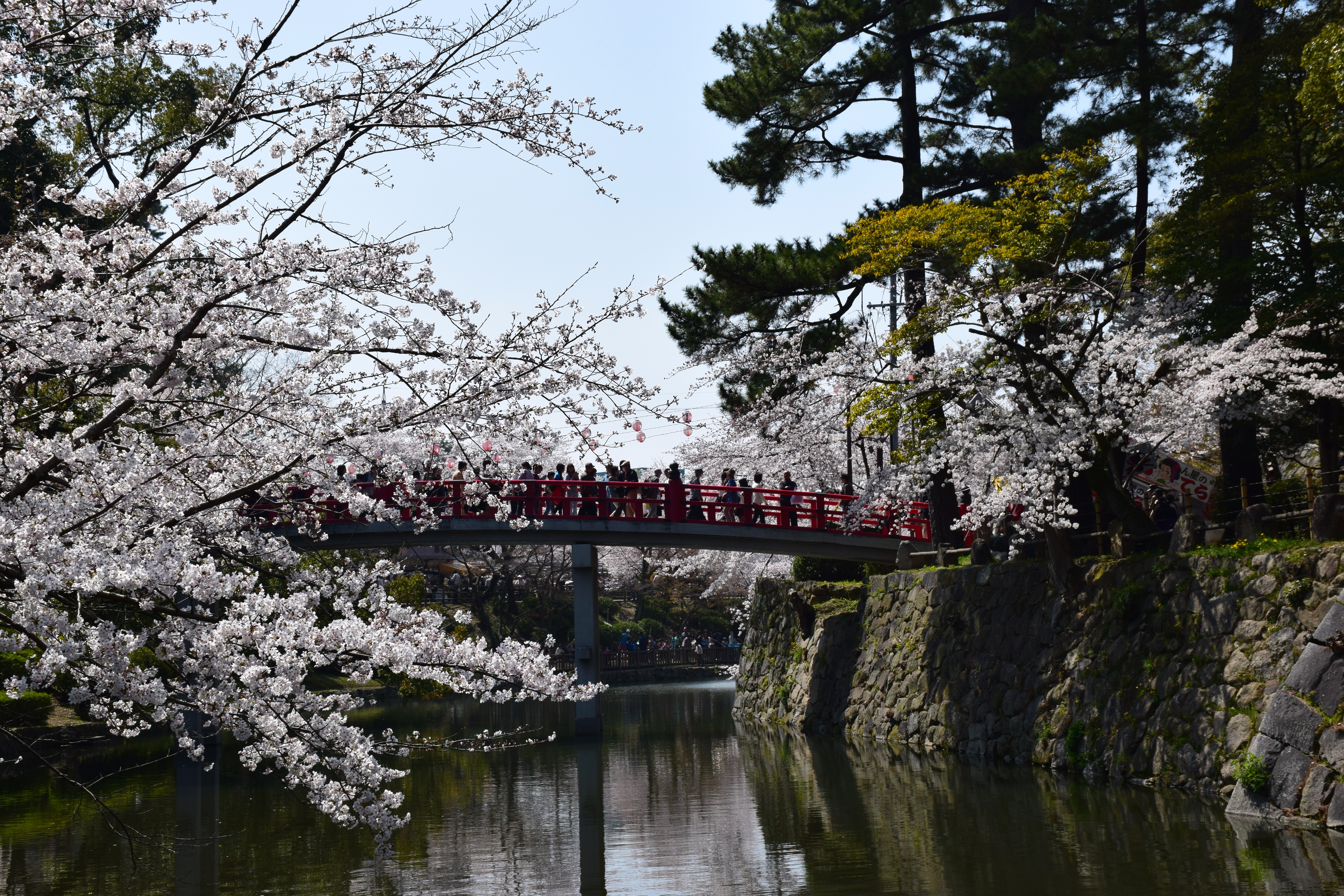
Okazaki Flower Festival

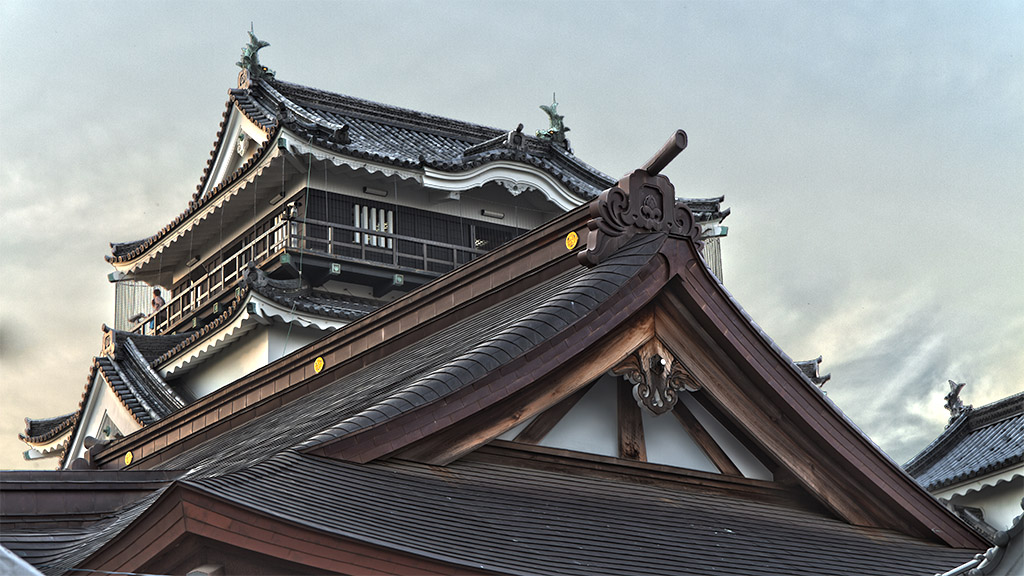
Detail view of Okazaki castle

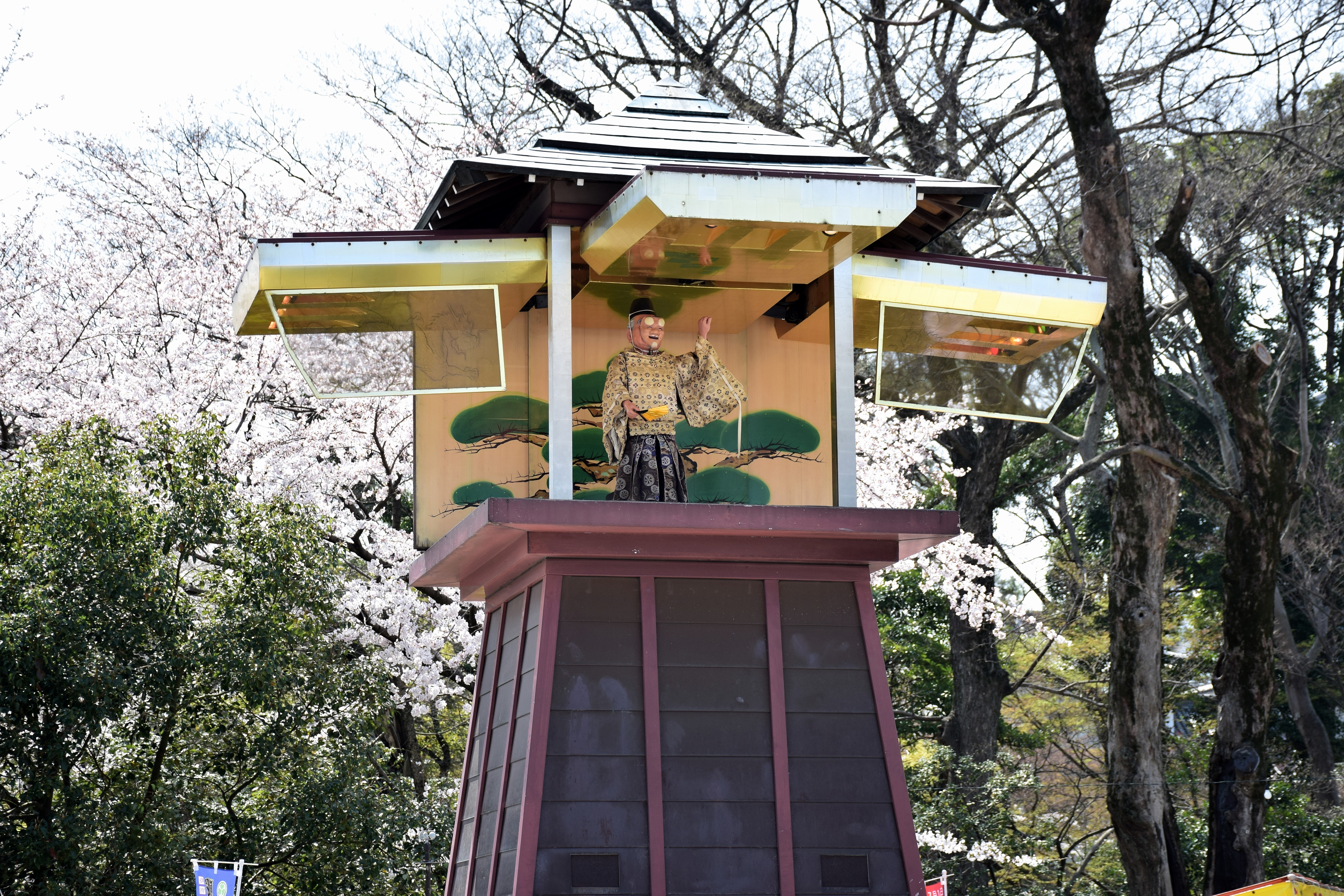
Tokugawa Ieyasu Karakuri Clock Tower

== Literature ==
- Benesch, Oleg and Ran Zwigenberg (2019). Japan's Castles: Citadels of Modernity in War and Peace. Cambridge: Cambridge University Press. p. 374. ISBN 9781108481946.
- De Lange, William (2021). An Encyclopedia of Japanese Castles. Groningen: Toyo Press. pp. 600 pages. ISBN 978-9492722300.
- Schmorleitz, Morton S. (1974). Castles in Japan. Tokyo: Charles E. Tuttle Co. pp. 144–145. ISBN 0-8048-1102-4.
- Motoo, Hinago (1986). Japanese Castles. Tokyo: Kodansha. p. 200 pages. ISBN 0-87011-766-1.
- Mitchelhill, Jennifer (2004). Castles of the Samurai: Power and Beauty. Tokyo: Kodansha. p. 112 pages. ISBN 4-7700-2954-3.
- Turnbull, Stephen (2003). Japanese Castles 1540-1640. Osprey Publishing. p. 64 pages. ISBN 1-84176-429-9.
