= Koromo Domain =

Feudal domain under the Edo period, Japan

Coordinates: 35°04′49.33″N 137°09′02.48″E

Koromo Domain 挙母藩
- Domain of Japan
- 1604–1620; 1636–1664; 1681–1871
- Capital: Koromo Castle
  - Type: Daimyō
- Historical era: Edo period
  - Established: 1604
  - Disestablished: 1871
- Today part of: Aichi Prefecture

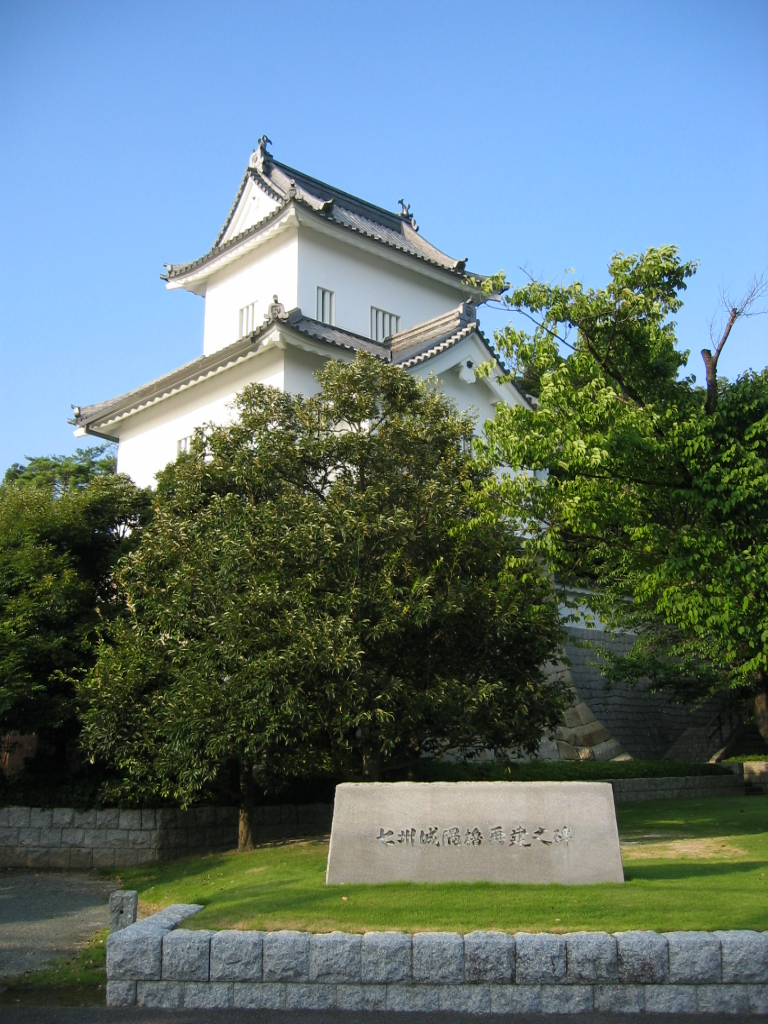
Reconstructed yagura of Koromo Castle, administrative center of Komoro Domain

Koromo Domain (挙母藩, Koromo han) was a feudal domain under the Tokugawa shogunate of Edo period Japan, located in Mikawa Province (modern-day eastern Aichi Prefecture), Japan. It was centered on Koromo Castle in what is now the city of Toyota, Aichi.

== History ==
A fortification was built near the present site of Koromo Castle during the Kamakura period, and the area was contested in the Sengoku period between the Imagawa clan and the Oda clan. After the establishment of the Tokugawa shogunate, the Miyake clan (formerly of Tahara) were allowed to return to Mikawa and were assigned a 10,000 koku domain on the banks of the Yasaku River. In 1600, Miyake Yasusada built a jin'ya fortified residence approximately a kilometer away from the site of the original fortification, and planted sakura trees all around it. The residence was nicknamed "Sakura-jō " (桜城).

The Miyake moved the seat of their domain to Kameyama Domain in Ise Province in 1619, but returned to Koromo from 1636 to 1674. After 1674, they were finally allowed to return to their ancestral Tahara Domain. Koromo then became tenryō territory ruled directly by the Tokugawa shogunate through appointed daikan administrators to 1688.

In 1688, a branch of the Honda clan was transferred to Koromo from Ishikawa Domain in Mutsu Province, remaining to 1749 when it was transferred to Sagara Domain. The Honda were replaced by a branch of the Naitō clan from Annaka Domain in Kōzuke Province. The Naitō ruled for the next 120 years until the Meiji restoration, and were allowed to construct the modest castle, Koromo Castle as their headquarters. Two of the Naitō clan daimyō, Masanari and Masahiro, were adopted into the family; they were the elder brothers of Ii Naosuke.

From 1836 to 1838, the domain suffered from crop failures and famine, which led to a number of large-scale peasant's uprisings. In 1854, the town was largely destroyed by the 1854 Ansei earthquake, and entered into the Bakumatsu period impoverished and with a minor as daimyō. The Ee ja nai ka movement found strong support in the domain. Although the domain dispatched some troops to guard the Tōkaidō and Sunpu Castle during the Boshin War, these troops surrendered to the new Meiji government without resistance.

The domain had a population of 19,253 people in 5078 households per an 1869 census. The domain maintained its primary residence (kamiyashiki) in Edo at Hanzonmon until the An'ei period (1772–1780), when it was relocated to Mita.

After the abolition of the han system in July 1871, the domain became “Koromo Prefecture”, which later became part of Nukata Prefecture, and finally Aichi Prefecture.

As with most domains, Koromo Domain consisted of several discontinuous territories calculated to provide the assigned kokudaka, based on periodic cadastral surveys and projected agricultural yields. At the end of the Edo period, Koromo Domain consisted of 25 villages in Kamo District and 6 villages neighboring Shitara District in Mikawa, and 12 villages in Kumehokujo District, Mimasaka Province, 8 villages in Shūchi District, and Haibara District, both in Tōtōmi Province.

== List of daimyō ==
#	Name	Tenure	Courtesy title	Court Rank	kokudaka
Miyake clan (fudai) 1604–1619;
1	Miyake Yasusada (三宅康貞)	1604–1615	-none-	Lower 5th (従五位下)	10,000 koku
2	Miyake Yasunobu (三宅康信)	1615–1620	Echigo-no-kami (越後守)	Lower 5th (従五位下)	10,000 koku
tenryō, 1620–1636
Miyake clan (fudai) 1636–1664
3	Miyake Yasumori (三宅康盛)	1636–1657	Daizen-no-suke (大膳亮)	Lower 5th (従五位下)	10,000 koku
4	Miyake Yasukatsu (三宅康勝)	1658–1664	Noto-no-kami (能登守)	Lower 5th (従五位下)	10,000 koku
tenryō, 1664–1681
Honda clan (fudai) 1681–1749
1	Honda Tadatoshi (本多忠利)	1681–1700	Yamashiro-no-kami (山城守)	Lower 5th (従五位下)	20,000 koku
2	Honda Tadatsugu (Koromo) (本多忠次)	1700–1711	Yamashiro-no-kami (山城守)	Lower 5th (従五位下)	20,000 koku
3	Honda Tadanaga (本多忠央)	1711–1749	Nagato-no-kami (長門守)	Lower 5th (従五位下)	20,000 koku
Naitō clan (fudai) 1749–1871
1	Naitō Masamitsu (内藤政苗)	1749–1766	Tamba-no-kami (丹波守)	Lower 5th (従五位下)	20,000 koku
2	Naitō Satobumi (内藤学文)	1766–1794	Yamashiro-no-kami (山城守)	Lower 5th (従五位下)	20,000 koku
3	Naitō Masamichi (内藤政峻)	1794–1813	Yamashiro-no-kami (山城守)	Lower 5th (従五位下)	20,000 koku
4	Naitō Masanari (内藤政成)	1813–1830	Yamashiro-no-kami (山城守)	Lower 5th (従五位下)	20,000 koku
5	Naitō Masahiro (内藤政優)	1830–1851	Tamba-no-kami (丹波守)	Lower 5th (従五位下)	20,000 koku
6	Naitō Masabumi (内藤政文)	1851–1858	Yamashiro-no-kami (山城守)	Lower 5th (従五位下)	20,000 koku
7	Naitō Masanari (内藤政成)	1858–1871	Tamba-no-kami (丹波守)	Lower 5th (従五位下)	20,000 koku
