= Mizuno Tadayuki =

Japanese daimyō

Mizuno Tadayuki (水野 忠之; July 4, 1669 – April 23, 1731) was a Japanese daimyō of the Edo period. He served in a variety of positions in the Tokugawa shogunate, including wakadoshiyori, rōjū, and Kyoto Shoshidai. Around 1722 he was appointed by Shogun Yoshimune as the first kanjōkata (勘定方) in charge of putting the Bakufu's financial affairs in order. By 1735, this had become the largest government office.

After the 47 rōnin incident, Tadayuki was given custody of nine of the Akō men: Hazama Jūjirō, Okada Suke'emon, Yatō Emonshichi, Muramatsu Sandayū, Mase Magokurō, Kayano Wasuke, Yokogawa Sanpei, Muramatsu Jirōzaemon, and Kanzaki Yogorō.

Preceded by Mizuno Tadamitsu	4th (Mizuno) Lord of Okazaki; 1699–1730	Succeeded by Mizuno Tadateru
Preceded by Matsudaira Nobutsune	14th Kyoto Shoshidai; 1714–1717	Succeeded by Matsudaira Tadachika
