= Koromo Castle =

Castle in Toyota, Aichi, Japan

Coordinates: 35°4′47.58″N 137°9′1.66″E

Koromo Castle 挙母城
- Toyota, Aichi Prefecture, Japan
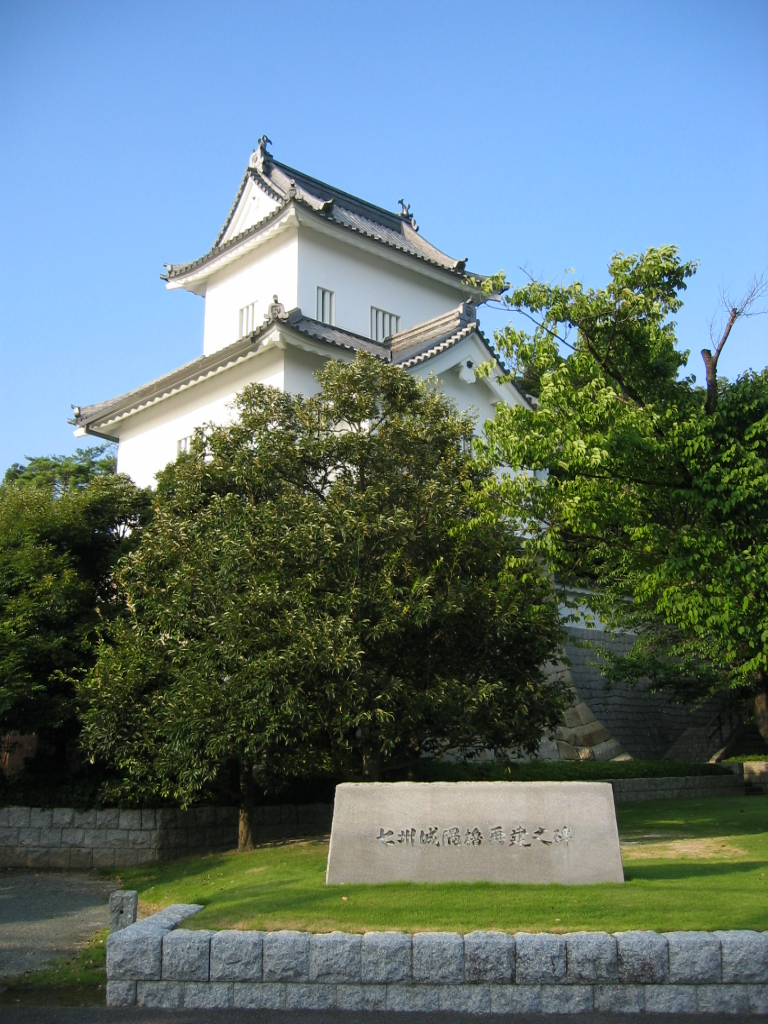
- Reconstructed yagura of Koromo Castle

Site information
- Type: hilltop-style Japanese castle
- Owner: reconstructed 1959
- Open to the public: yes

Location

Site history
- Built: 1782
- Built by: Naito Masamitsu
- In use: Edo period
- Demolished: 1871

Koromo Castle (挙母城, Koromo-jō) is a Japanese castle located in Toyota, Aichi Prefecture, Japan. At the end of the Edo period, Koromo Castle was home to the Naitō clan, daimyō of Koromo Domain. The castle was also known as Shichishū-jō (七州城).

== History ==
A fortification was built near the present site of Koromo Castle during the Kamakura period, and the area was contested in the Sengoku period between the Imagawa clan and the Oda clan. After the establishment of the Tokugawa shogunate, the Miyake clan (formerly of Tahara were allowed to return to Mikawa and were assigned a 10,000 koku domain. In 1600, Miyake Yasusada built a jin'ya fortified residence approximately a kilometer away from the site of the original fortification, and planted sakura trees all around it. The residence was nicknamed "Sakura-jō " (桜城).

The Naitō clan were assigned to Koromo in 1749 when Naitō Masamitsu was transferred from Kōzuke Province. As his status allowed him to construct a castle, he erected a small-scaled donjon with two yagura and several watchtower gates on the 65-meter Mt. Doji next to the site of the Miyake residence in 1782. The new castle was protected on one side by the Yasaku River. From the top of the donjon, it was possible to see seven provinces (Mikawa, Owari, Mino, Shinano, Tōtōmi, Ise, Omi) and thus the castle was named "Shichishū-jō " (七州城).

The Naitō clan remained in residence until the Meiji Restoration. Afterwards, the castle site was used for a high school, Toyota City Art Museum, and a park. A remnant of the original castle moat still exists, but the corner yagura is a reconstruction from 1978.

== Literature ==
- Schmorleitz, Morton S. (1974). Castles in Japan. Tokyo: Charles E. Tuttle Co. pp. 144–145. ISBN 0-8048-1102-4.
- Motoo, Hinago (1986). Japanese Castles. Tokyo: Kodansha. p. 200 pages. ISBN 0-87011-766-1.
- Mitchelhill, Jennifer (2004). Castles of the Samurai: Power and Beauty. Tokyo: Kodansha. p. 112 pages. ISBN 4-7700-2954-3.
- Turnbull, Stephen (2003). Japanese Castles 1540-1640. Osprey Publishing. p. 64 pages. ISBN 1-84176-429-9.
