= Miyake clan =

Miyake clan 三宅氏
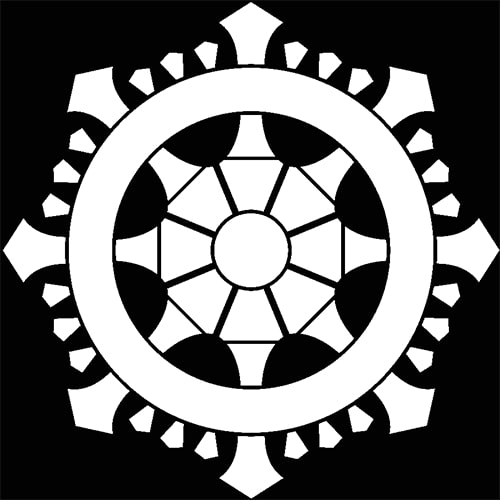
- Miyake clan crest
- Home province: Mikawa
- Parent house: Minamoto clan (Uda Genji) (self-proclaimed); Kudara no Konikishi clan (self-proclaimed); Silla royalty (self-proclaimed)
- Titles: daimyō, viscount
- Founder: Kojima Takanori (self-proclaimed); Amenohiboko (self-proclaimed)
- Final ruler: Miyake Yasuyoshi
- Founding year: 14th century
- Dissolution: still extant
- Ruled until: 1873 (Abolition of the han system)

Miyake clan (三宅氏, Miyake-shi) were a samurai kin group which rose to prominence in the Sengoku period and the Edo period. Under the Tokugawa shogunate, the Miyake were hereditary vassals of the Tokugawa clan. The Miyake were classified as one of the fudai daimyō clans.

== History ==
The clan claimed descent from different origins including the Uda Genji, and the Kudara no Konikishi clan from Paekche. As their founder, the clan specifically claimed descent from the famed 14th century Kamakura period warrior Kojima Takanori. In another instance, the clan claimed that the legendary Silla prince, Amenohiboko was in fact their founder.

At the start of the Sengoku period, the Miyake were based in northern Mikawa Province, and were hereditary enemies to the neighboring Matsudaira clan. However, under the leadership of Miyake Masasada, the clan submitted to the Matsudaira in 1558.

Masasada's son Yasusada (1544–1615) served as a general in the armies of Tokugawa Ieyasu. After the creation of the Tokugawa shogunate, he was appointed daimyō of Koromo Domain, a 10,000 koku fief in Mikawa Province in 1604.

Miyake Yasunobu (1563–1632) was transferred to the 20,000 koku Ise-Kameyama Domain in 1615.

The Miyake moved to Tahara Domain (12,000 koku) in southern Mikawa Province in 1664, where they remained until the Meiji Restoration.

The final daimyō of Tahara Domain, Miyake Yasuyoshi (1831–1895), served as guji to the Kunōzan Tōshō-gū under the Meiji government. He was made a viscount (shishaku) in the kazoku peerage system.
