= Taharah =

Taharah may refer to:

- Tumah and taharah, ritual impurity and purity in Judaism
- Taharah, ritual purity in Islam

== See also ==
- Tahara (disambiguation)
