= Tatsuoka Castle =

- 龍岡城
- Saku, Nagano, Japan
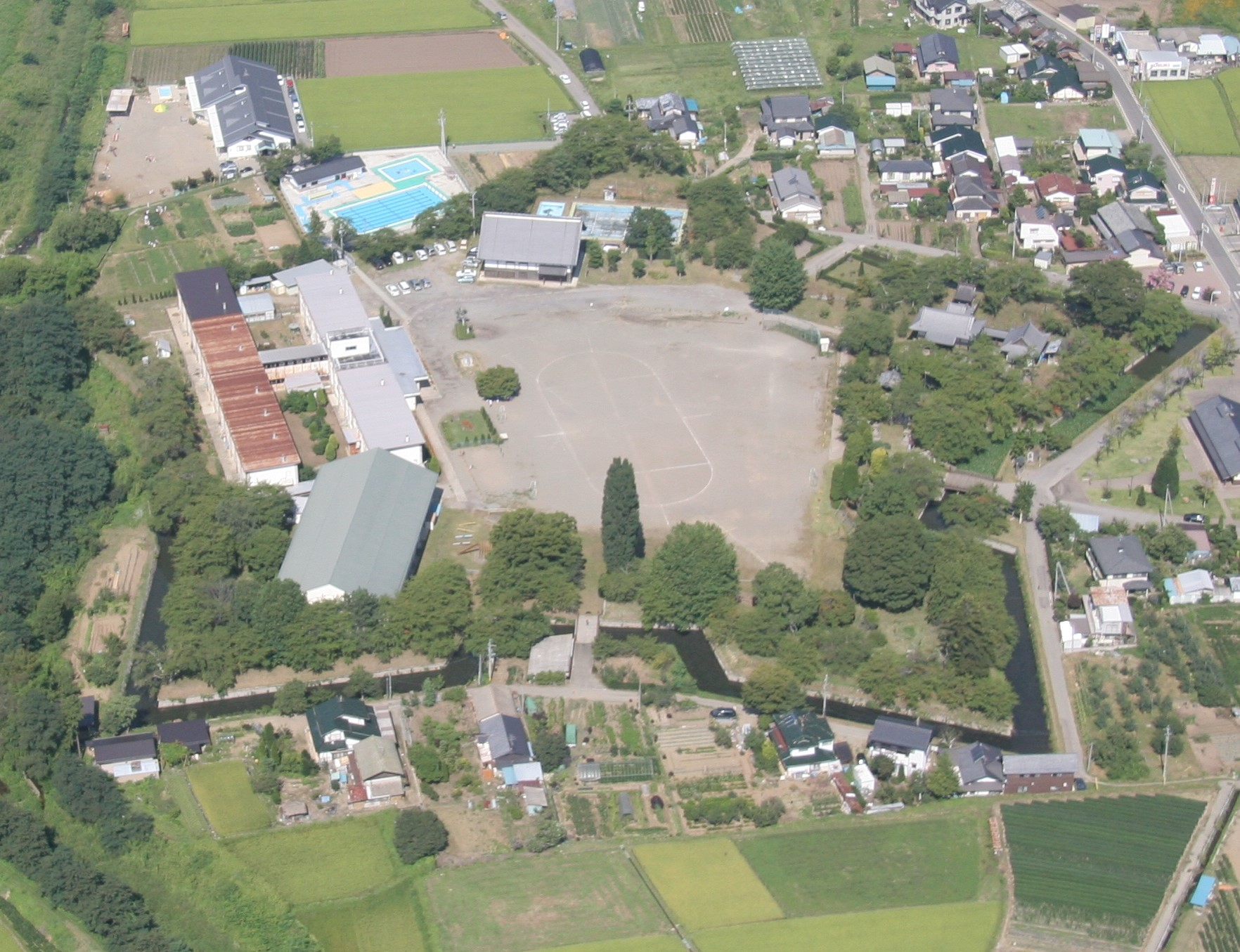
- Aerial photograph of Tatsuoka Castle site

Site information
- Type: Star fort
- Open to the public: No
- Condition: Ruins

Location
- Coordinates: 36°11′46″N 138°30′06″E

Site history
- Built: 1867
- Built by: Matsudaira Norikata
- In use: until 1868

Garrison information
- Past commanders: Matsudaira Norikata

Tatsuoka Castle (龍岡城, Tatsuoka-jō) was a Bakumatsu period pentagonal "star fort" located in what is now part of the city of Saku, Nagano prefecture. It was the primary fortress of Tatsuoka Domain, ruled by the Ogyū-Matsudaira clan. Along with the Goryōkaku in Hakodate, Hokkaidō, it is one of only two star fortresses in Japan, and the castle ruins have been designated as a National Historic Site since 1934.

== Background ==
Tatsuoka Castle is located in a rural area of what is now the southern portion of Saku city, at the eastern edge of Nagano Prefecture, on a side route of the Nakasendō highway connecting Shinano Province with Kai Province and Kōzuke province.

== History ==
Tatsuoka Castle was built by Matsudaira Norikata (1829-1910) of the Ogyū-Matsudaira clan at the end of the Edo period. The Ogyū-Matsudaira were a cadet branch of the Matsudaira clan and formerly resided at Okutono Domain in Mikawa Province. Following the Perry Expedition and the arrival of the kurofune threatening Japan's national isolation policy, Matsudaira Norikata was appointed a Obangashira, or commander of Shogunate troops in 1863, only at 24 years old. A student of rangaku and western military science, he decided that the Okazaki area was vulnerable due to its proximity to the coast, and decided to relocate his seat to his holdings in the inland area of Saku.

As his holdings were small, he was unable to afford a very large fortification. His status was also low, and he was not entitled to build a formal castle with a tenshu, but only a jin'ya, or fortified residence. The total size of the castle is approximately 200 meters per side, with a narrow moat having a width of only five meters. At the five points of the star were gun emplacements, and gates were constructed on the northern and eastern sides. Due to its compact size and the location of the large daimyō residence in the center, the castle had little military value as it was impossible to defend in depth; furthermore, a nearby hill outside the castle meant that the interior could easily have been subjected to artillery fire. Due to lack of funds, only the battery in the southwest corner was equipped with cannon. Nevertheless, this castle was regarded as revolutionary for Japan, and predates the more famous Goryōkaku by several years. Construction began in 1863 and was completed in 1867.

Following the Meiji restoration, Tatsuoka Castle was demolished in 1872 and the site reverted to farmland. Later, the Taguchi Elementary School was built within the remnants of the moats. The castle was listed as one of the Continued Top 100 Japanese Castles in 2017. Of the original structures within the castle, only the kitchen building survived. It was used for storing farm implements, and was later relocated within the castle grounds to be used as a structure of the elementary school in 1929. The former daimyō residence was relocated to a temple in the city of Saku, where it serves as the Hondō, the East Gate was relocated to Yakashi-ji temple and the Yakui Gate was relocated to a private house in the same city. In front of the former main gate of the castle is a museum (the Goryōkaku Deai no Yakata (五稜郭 であいの館, Goryōkaku de ai no yakata)) where materials related to Tatsuoka Castle are exhibited. The castle site is about 20 to 30 minutes on foot from Usuda Station on the JR East Koumi Line; however, it is not open to the public.

== See also ==
- List of Historic Sites of Japan (Nagano)
- List of foreign-style castles in Japan

== Literature ==
- De Lange, William (2021). An Encyclopedia of Japanese Castles. Groningen: Toyo Press. pp. 600 pages. ISBN 978-9492722300.
