= Okutono Domain =

Feudal domain of the Edo period

Tatsuoka Domain (1868–1871) 龍岡藩 Tanokuchi Domain (1863–1868) 田野口藩 Okutono Domain (1711–1863) 奥殿藩 Ogyū Domain (1684–1711) 大給藩
- Domain of Japan
- 1684–1871
- Capital: Ogyū jin'ya (1684–1711); Okutono jin'ya (1711–1863); Tanokuchi jin'ya (1863–1871)
  - Type: Daimyō
- Historical era: Edo period
  - Established: 1684
  - Disestablished: 1871
Preceded by	Succeeded by
Shinano Province; Mikawa Province	Nagano Prefecture; Ina Prefecture
- Today part of: Aichi Prefecture, Nagano Prefecture

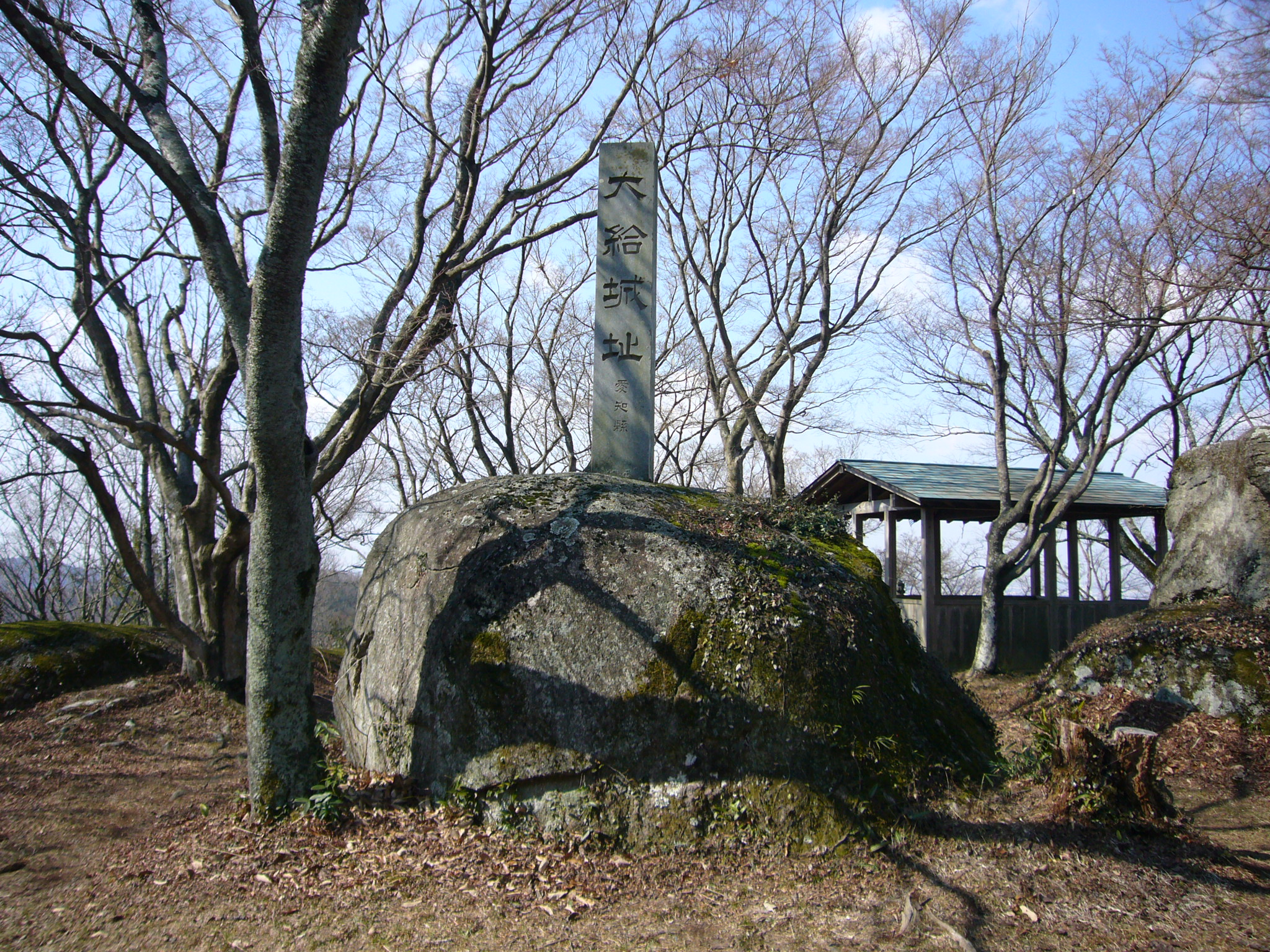
Monument commemorating the site of Ogyū Castle

Okutono Domain (奥殿藩, Okutono-han), also known as Okudono, was a feudal domain under the Tokugawa shogunate of Edo period Japan, located in Kamo District and Nukata Districts of Mikawa Province (part of modern Aichi Prefecture), and in Saku District, Shinano Province, (part of modern Nagano Prefecture) Japan. The domain was also known as Ogyū Domain (大給藩, Ogyū-han) and later known as Tanoguchi Domain (田野口藩, Tanoguchi-han) and Tatsuoka Domain (龍岡藩, Tatsuoka-han). The ruling family was the Ogyū-Matsudaira clan.

== History ==
The Ogyū clan was a cadet branch of the Matsudaira clan based in northern Mikawa Province, and were hereditary vassals of the Tokugawa clan. Matsudaira Masatsugu was awarded a 6000 koku hatamoto post within the Tokugawa shogunate for his services in the Battle of Osaka. His son, Matsudaira Noritsugu, increased to 16,000 koku, and was thus promoted to the ranks of the fudai daimyō in 1684.

In 1713, Matsudaira Norizane moved the seat of the domain from mountainous Ogyū (in what is now the northern portion of the city of Toyota to the more conveniently located Okutono location (in what is now part of the city of Okazaki. However, the domain suffered greatly due to inclement weather and flooding of the Yasaku River during the Kyōhō period, which led to crop failure and famine. The problems were repeated during the Great Tenpō Famine of 1832–36, although the domain was able to escape the more severe effects of the famine due to reforms implemented by its lord, Matsudaira Noritoshi.

In the Bakumatsu period, the domain achieved prominence thanks to its last daimyō, Matsudaira Norikata, who served as a senior councilor in the final years of the Tokugawa shogunate. Another contemporary figure born in Okutono was Nagai Naoyuki. During Norikata's tenure, the domain seat was moved from Mikawa Province to the Tanokuchi district of Shinano Province (though the holdings remained unchanged), and with the construction of Tatsuoka Castle, the domain also became known as Tatsuoka Domain. The domain was dissolved by the Meiji restoration in 1871 with the abolition of the han system.

== Holdings at the end of the Edo period ==
As with most domains in the han system, Okutono Domain consisted of several discontinuous territories calculated to provide the assigned kokudaka, based on periodic cadastral surveys and projected agricultural yields.

- Mikawa Province
  - 28 villages in Kamo District
  - 7 villages in Nukata District
- Shinano Province
  - 24 villages in Saku District

== List of daimyō ==
Ogyū-Matsudaira clan, 1703–1871 (fudai)

- As Ogyū Domain (大給藩, Ogyū-han)

#	Name	Tenure	Courtesy title	Court Rank	kokudaka	Lineage
1	Matsudaira Noritsugu (松平乗次)	1684–1687	Nuidono-no-kami (縫殿頭)	Lower 5th (従五位下)	16,000 koku	son of hatamoto Matsudaira Naotsugu
2	Matsudaira Norinari (松平乗成)	1687–1703	Nuidono-no-kami (縫殿頭)	Lower 5th (従五位下)	16,000 koku	son of Noritsugu
3	Matsudaira Norizane (松平乗真)	1703–1711	Nuidono-no-kami (縫殿頭)	Lower 5th (従五位下)	16,000 koku	son of hatamoto Honda Masatane

- As Okutono Domain (奥殿藩, Okutono-han)

#	Name	Tenure	Courtesy title	Court Rank	kokudaka	Lineage
3	Matsudaira Norizane ( 松平乗真)	1711–1716	Nuidono-no-kami (縫殿頭)	Lower 5th (従五位下)	16,000 koku	transfer from Ogyū
4	Matsudaira Mitsunori (松平盈乗)	1716–1742	Nuidono-no-kami (縫殿頭)	Lower 5th (従五位下)	16,000 koku	son of Norizane
5	Matsudaira Noriyasu (松平乗穏)	1742–1782	Iwami-no-kami (石見守)	Lower 5th (従五位下)	16,000 koku	son of Mitsunori
6	Matsudaira Noritomo (松平乗友)	1782–1790	Hyōbu-no-shō (兵部少輔)	Lower 5th (従五位下)	16,000 koku	2nd son of Noriyasu
7	Matsudaira Noritada (松平乗尹)	1790–1802	Mondo-no-kami (主水正)	Lower 5th (従五位下)	16,000 koku	4th son of Noriyasu
8	Matsudaira Noriyoshi (松平乗羨)	1802–1827	Nuidono-no-kami(縫殿頭)	Lower 5th (従五位下)	16,000 koku	2nd son of Noritomo
9	Matsudaira Noritoshi (松平乗利)	1827–1852	Iwami-no-kami(石見守)	Lower 5th (従五位下)	16,000 koku	son of Noriyoshi
10	Matsudaira Norikata (松平乗謨)	1852–1863	Nuidono-no-kami (縫殿頭)	Lower 5th (従五位下)	16,000 koku	2nd son of Noritoshi

- As Tanokuchi Domain (田野口藩, Tanokuchi-han)

#	Name	Tenure	Courtesy title	Court Rank	kokudaka	Lineage
10	Matsudaira Norikata (松平乗謨)	1863–1871	Nuidono-no-kami (縫殿頭)	Lower 5th (従五位下)	16,000 koku	transfer from Okutono

== See also ==
- List of Han
