= Atsumi, Aichi =

Atsumi 渥美町
- Former municipality
- Flag Emblem

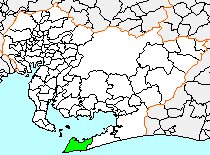
- Location of Atsumi in Aichi Prefecture

- Location in Japan
- Coordinates: 34°42′34.77″N 137°10′54.3″E
- Country: Japan
- Region: Chūbu (Tōkai)
- Prefecture: Aichi Prefecture
- District: Atsumi
- Merged: October 1, 2005 (now part of Tahara)

Area
  - Total: 82.18 km^{2} (31.73 sq mi)

Population (July 31, 2005)
  - Total: 22,472
  - Density: 436.77/km^{2} (1,131.2/sq mi)
- Time zone: UTC+09:00 (JST)
- Symbols
- Bird: Hawk
- Flower: Chrysanthemum
- Tree: Pine

Atsumi (渥美町, Atsumi-chō) was a town located in Atsumi District, Aichi Prefecture, Japan.

As of July 31, 2005, the town had an estimated population of 22,472 and a population density of 436.77 persons per km^{2}. Its total area was 82.18 km^{2}.

== Geography ==
Atsumi was located in southwest Aichi Prefecture, at the extreme tip of the Atsumi Peninsula. The town was surrounded by the ocean on three sides, with Mikawa Bay to the north and west, and the Pacific Ocean to the south. Parts of the town was within the borders of the Mikawa Wan Quasi-National Park.

== History ==
The area around Atsumi has been settled since prehistoric times, and numerous Jōmon period remains have been found in the area, including shell middens. Pottery from the Heian period and Kamakura periods have also been found. In the Edo period, the part of the area was under the control of Tahara Domain, and part was administered as tenryō directly by the Tokugawa shogunate. The modern town of Atsumi was created on April 15, 1955, by the merger of the former town of Fukue with the villages of Izumi and Iragomisaki. The area was unable to support commercial agriculture until the completion of large-scale irrigation projects in the 1960s.

On October 1, 2005, Atsumi was merged into the expanded city of Tahara, and has ceased to exist as an independent municipality.
