= Atsumi (name) =

- Pronunciation: atsɯmi (IPA)
- Gender: Unisex

Origin
- Origin: Japanese
- Meaning: Different meanings depending on the kanji used

Other names
- Alternative spelling: Atumi (Kunrei-shiki) Atumi (Nihon-shiki) Atsumi (Hepburn)

Atsumi is both a unisex Japanese given name and a Japanese surname.

== Written forms ==
Atsumi can be written using many different combinations of kanji characters. Here are some examples:

- 渥美, "kindness/moisten, beauty"
- 渥実, "kindness/moisten, fruit/reality"
- 渥巳, "kindness/moisten, sign of the snake (Chinese zodiac)"
- 淳美, "honest, beauty"
- 淳実, "honest, fruit/reality"
- 淳巳, "honest, sign of the snake (Chinese zodiac)"
- 淳三, "honest, three"
- 厚美, "thick, beauty"
- 厚実, "thick, fruit/reality"
- 厚巳, "thick, sign of the snake (Chinese zodiac)"
- 敦美, "kindliness, beauty"
- 敦実, "kindliness, fruit/reality"
- 敦巳, "kindliness, sign of the snake (Chinese zodiac)"
- 惇美, "kind, beauty"
- 惇実, "kind, fruit/reality"
- 篤美, "sincere, beauty"
- 篤巳, "sincere, sign of the snake (Chinese zodiac)"
- 篤三, "sincere, three"

The name can also be written in hiragana あつみ or katakana アツミ.

== Notable people with the given name Atsumi ==
- Atsumi Fukumoto (福本 温子; born 1988), Japanese rower
- Atsumi Tanezaki (種﨑 敦美), Japanese voice actress

== Notable people with the surname Atsumi ==
- Jiro Atsumi (渥美 二郎), real name Toshio Atsumi (渥美 敏夫, born 1952), Japanese male singer
- Kiyoshi Atsumi (渥美 清; 1928–1996), Japanese actor
- Saiki Atsumi, Japanese singer and member of Band-Maid
- Saori Atsumi (渥美 佐織), Japanese singer
