= Tahara Domain =

Japanese former subdivision

Tahara Domain 田原藩
- Domain of Japan
- 1601–1871
- Capital: Tahara Castle
  - Type: Daimyō
- Historical era: Edo period
  - Established: 1601
  - Disestablished: 1871
- Today part of: Aichi Prefecture

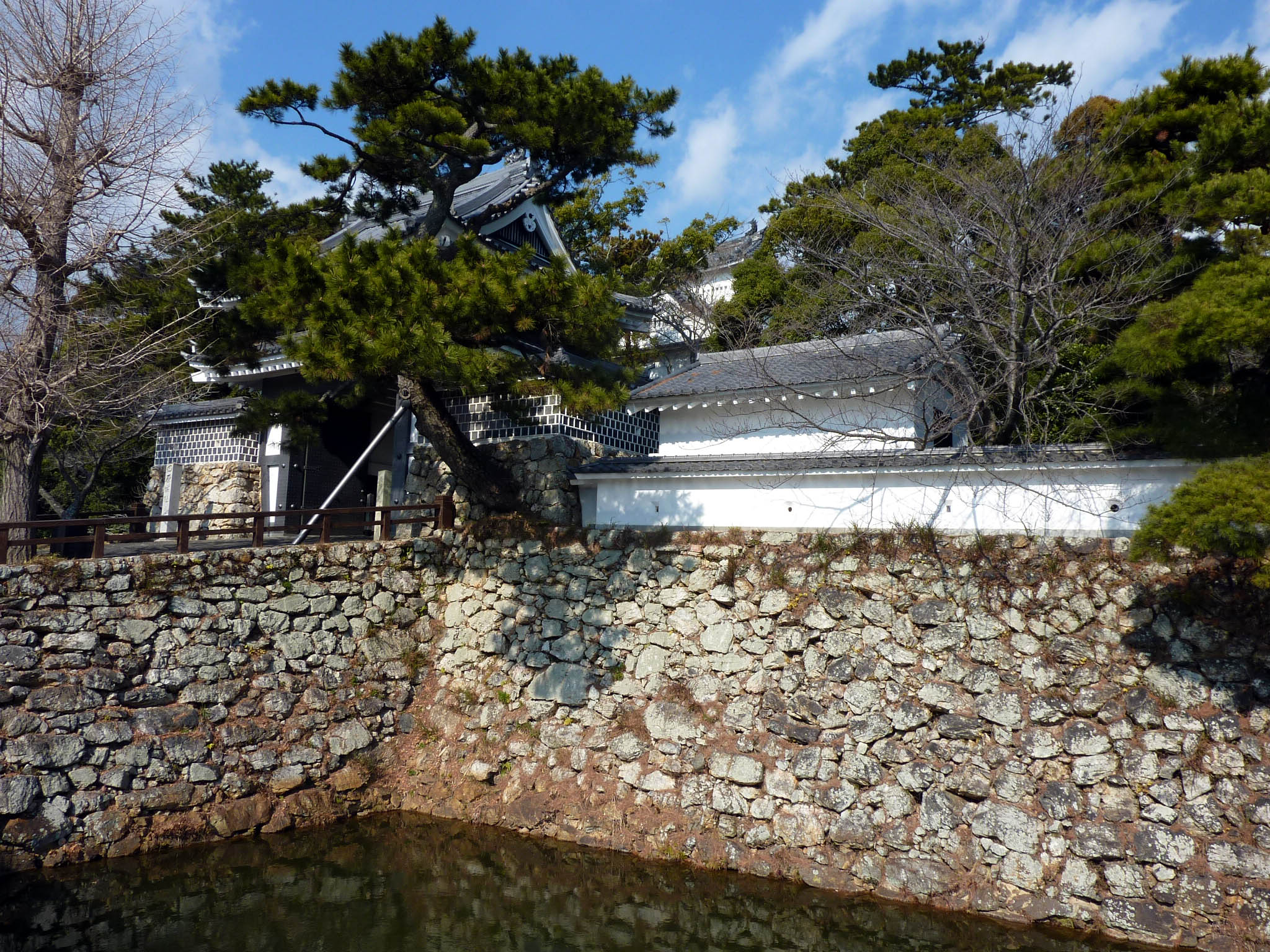
Gate of Tahara Castle, administrative center of Tahara Domain

Tahara Domain (田原藩, Tahara-han) was a minor fudai Japanese domain under the Tokugawa shogunate of Edo period Japan, located in southern Mikawa Province (modern-day southeastern Aichi Prefecture), Japan. It was centered on Tahara Castle in what is now the city of Tahara.

== History ==
Most of the Atsumi Peninsula was controlled by the Toda clan during the Muromachi and Sengoku periods. The Toda pledged loyalty to the Imagawa clan, but later came under the rule of the Tokugawa clan. Following the Battle of Odawara in 1590, Toyotomi Hideyoshi assigned the Kantō region to Tokugawa Ieyasu and the Toda were dispossessed of their holdings, which were given to Hideyoshi's vassal, Ikeda Terumasa. The Toda accompanied Ieyasu to Edo and were reduced in status to hatamoto with a minor 5000 koku holding in Shimoda in Izu Province.

Following the establishment of the Tokugawa shogunate, Toda Katatsugu was raised in status to 10,000 koku daimyō, and allowed to return to Tahara Castle, which was now the center of the newly created Tahara feudal domain in 1601. In 1664, his son Toda Tadamasa, was transferred to Amakusa Domain in Bungo Province with an increase in revenues to 21,000 koku and Tahara Domain was reassigned to the Miyake clan, who remained in residence until the Meiji Restoration.

The domain had a population of 20,343 people in 4314 households per a 1696 census. The domain maintained its primary residence (kamiyashiki) in Edo at Hanzonmon. At the end of the Edo period, its holdings consisted of 34 villages in Atsumi District, Mikawa Province.

Although only a minor domain in terms of revenue, Tahara Domain had the distinction of being allowed a full castle, unlike most domains of similar size, which were allowed only a jin'ya, or fortified residence. Tahara Domain was noted for its domain academy and scholarship, and produced noted scholars such as Watanabe Kazan.

After the abolition of the han system in July 1871, Tahara Domain became “Tahara Prefecture”, which merged with the short lived Nukata Prefecture in November 1871, which later became part of Aichi Prefecture.

== List of daimyō ==
#	Name	Tenure	Courtesy title	Court Rank	kokudaka	Lineage
Toda clan (fudai 1601-1664
1	Toda Takatsugu (戸田尊次)	1601–1615	Tosa-no-kami (土佐頭)	Lower 5th (従五位下)	10,000 koku	son of hatamoto Toda Tadatsugu
2	Toda Tadayoshi (戸田忠能)	1615–1647	Inaba-no-kami (因幡守)	Lower 5th (従五位下)	10,000 koku	son of Yasutsugu
3	Toda Tadamasa (戸田忠昌)	1647–1664	Yamashiro-no-kami (山城守)	Lower 4th (従四位下), Jiju (侍従)	10,000 koku	grandson of Yasutsugu transfer to Amakusa Domain, 21,000 koku
Miyake clan (fudai) 1664-1871
1	Miyake Yasukatsu (三宅康勝)	1664–1687	Noto-no-kami (能登守)	Lower 5th (従五位下)	12,000 koku	transfer from Koromo 10,000 koku
2	Miyake Yasuo(三宅康雄)	1687–1726	Bizen-no-kami (備前守)	Lower 5th (従五位下)	12,000 koku	son of Yasukatsu
3	Miyake Yasunori(三宅康徳)	1726–1745	Bingo-no-kami (備後守)	Lower 5th (従五位下)	12,000 koku	son of Yasuo
4	Miyake Yasutaka (三宅康高)	1745–1755	Bizen-no-kami (備前守)	Lower 5th (従五位下)	12,000 koku	son of Yasunori
5	Miyake Yasuyuki (三宅康之)	1755–1780	Bingo-no-kami (備後守)	Lower 5th (従五位下)	12,000 koku	grandson of Yasuo
6	Miyake Yasutake (三宅康武)	1780–1785	Bizen-no-kami (備前守)	Lower 5th (従五位下)	12,000 koku	4th son of Yasuyuki
7	Miyake Yasukuni (三宅康邦)	1785–1792	Noto-no-kami (能登守)	Lower 5th (従五位下)	12,000 koku	5th son of Yasuyuki
8	Miyake Yasutomo (三宅康友)	1792–1809	Bizen-no-kami (備前守)	Lower 5th (従五位下)	12,000 koku	4th son of Yasutaka
9	Miyake Yasukazu (三宅康和)	1809–1823	Tsushima-no-kami (対馬守)	Lower 5th (従五位下)	12,000 koku	grandson of Yasutaka
10	Miyake Yasuteru (三宅康明)	1823–1827	Bizen-no-kami (備前守)	Lower 5th (従五位下)	12,000 koku	3rd son of Yasutomo
11	Miyake Yasunao (三宅康直)	1828–1850	Tosa-no-kami (土佐守)	Lower 4th (従四位下)	12,000 koku	9th son of Sakai Tadazane
12	Miyake Yasuyoshi (三宅康保)	1850–1871	Bizen-no-kami (備前守)	Lower 5th (従五位下), Viscount	12,000 koku	grandson of Yasuteru
