= Hirotaka Chiba =

Japanese former actor and voice actor

- 千葉 皓敬
- Born: October 5, 1992 (age 33)
- Occupations: Actor, voice actor
- Years active: 1994-2007

Hirotaka Chiba (千葉 皓敬, Chiba Hirotaka; born October 5, 1992) is a Japanese former actor and voice actor.

== Notable roles ==
=== TV ===
- Private Detective Mike (Episode 5) (2002, Nippon Television)
- Aikurushii (Episode 2) (2005, Tokyo Broadcasting System)

=== TV commercials ===
- Sanyo (The Bra to Kodoru) (1994)
- Otsuka Pharmaceutical Co. Pocari Sweat Beanstalk (1997)
- Sugakiya Foods Co., Ltd. (1996) (Pan fried prawn noodle heaven)
- Wacom (1997)

== Dubbing roles ==
=== Live-action films ===
- The Adventures of Sharkboy and Lavagirl in 3-D (additional Japanese voice-dubbing role)
- Charlie and the Chocolate Factory (Augustus Gloop) (Philip Wiegratz) (DVD/Blu-ray Editions)
- Zathura (Walter) (Josh Hutcherson) (DVD/UMD Editions)
