= Kojima Takanori =

- 兒島 高徳
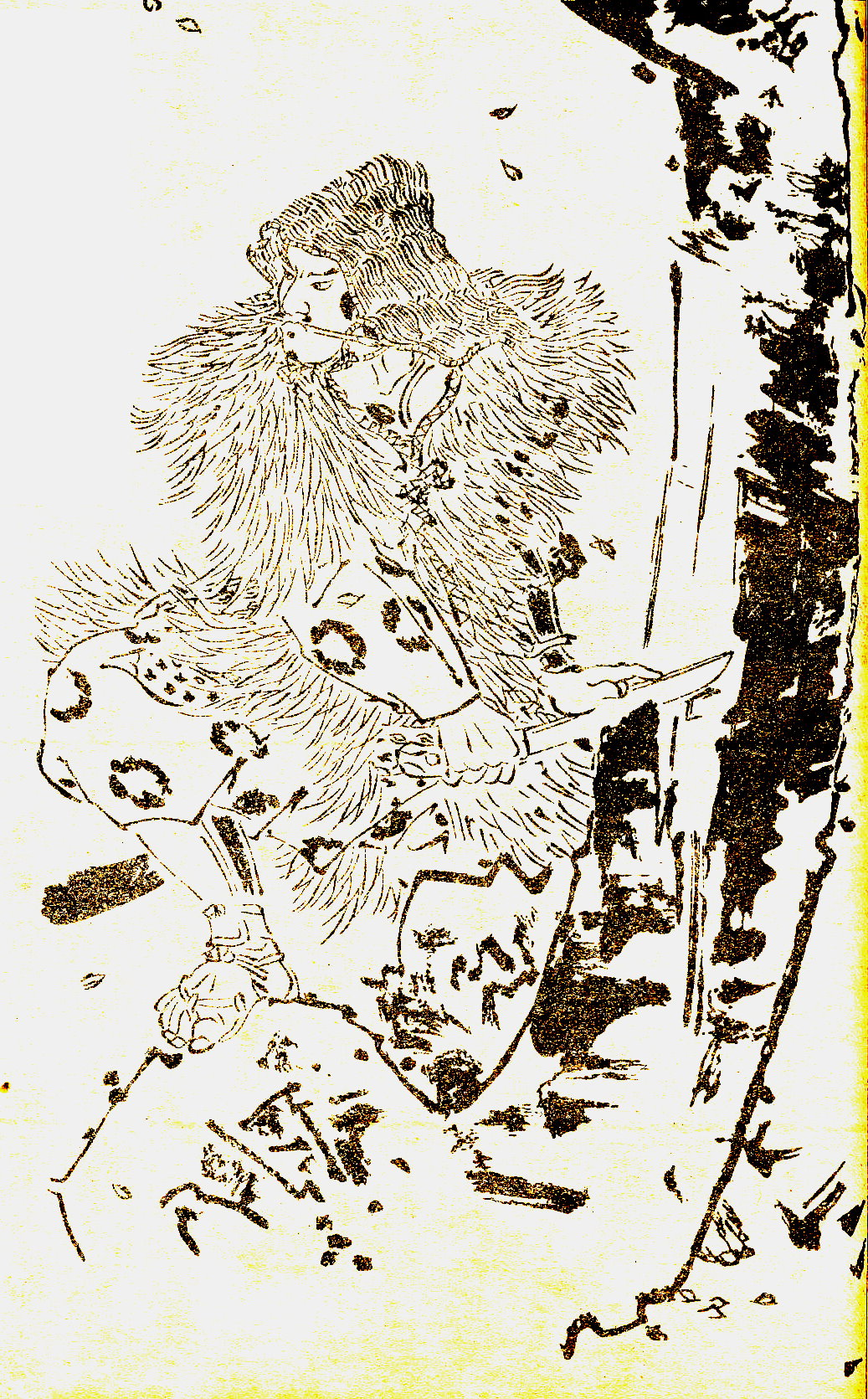
- Kojima Takanori, wearing a mino, peels bark off the cherry tree. Depicted by Kikuchi Yōsai.
- Born: c. 1312; Bizen Province, Japan
- Died: c. 1382 (aged 69–70); Japan

Kojima Saburō Takanori (Japanese: 兒島 三郎 高徳; fl. 1312–1382) was a Japanese samurai general who served Emperor Go-Daigo. A major character in the Taiheiki , he was revered in later times as a model of loyalty.

== Biography ==
Kojima was born into an influential local clan in Bizen Province. According to one version, Kojima's family were descendants of Amenohiboko who immigrated to Japan from the Korean kingdom of Silla long ago.

In 1332, Emperor Go-Daigo was banished to the Oki Islands after leading an unsuccessful rebellion against the Hōjō clan.

The Emperor was to be escorted by an entourage of 500 men led by the Hōjō retainer Sasaki Takauji. Hearing of this, Kojima rallied a band of 200 men to rescue the Emperor and planned to ambush the entourage as it passed through Bizen Province. However, Kojima miscalculated Sasaki's route, and after pursuing the Emperor as far as a place called Sugisaka (杉坂) on the border of Mimasaka Province, the initial plan's failure became apparent and Kojima's men dispersed and vanished.

Kojima refused to give up the mission and continued alone to Innoshō (院ノ庄) in Tsuyama, residence of the shugo of Mimasaka Province, where the Emperor's entourage had stopped to rest for the night. Under cover of darkness, Kojima snuck into the garden of the compound surrounding the Emperor's quarters. Due to the high level of security, he knew that he would not be able to extricate the Emperor by himself and reluctantly decided to withdraw. Before escaping the garden, Kojima used his shortsword to peel a section of bark off the trunk of a Japanese cherry tree. On the smooth wood he wrote a Classical Chinese poem in 10 characters:

天莫空勾践，時非無范蠡
Heaven will not forsake Goujian — a Fan Li is not lacking today.

When the Emperor saw the poem on the tree the next morning, he immediately recognized its meaning: according to legend, King Goujian of the ancient Kingdom of Yue, who had been defeated and imprisoned by King Fuchai of Wu, was able to avenge himself and destroy his rival with the help of the loyal vassal Fan Li. The following year, loyalists led by Nawa Nagatoshi were able to rescue the Emperor from Oki.

Like many other ancient heroes, Kojima was demonized after the Surrender of Japan in 1945 and has today fallen into obscurity. An enigmatic figure, Kojima appears frequently in the Taiheiki but is not mentioned in any other surviving historical documents. This has given rise to a theory, especially popular after 1945, that he never actually existed and was merely a fabrication of the author of the Taiheiki. However, there is another theory that the Taiheiki's anonymous author "Kojima Hōshi" (小島法師) was none other than Kojima Takanori himself.
