= Honda Hirotaka =

Japanese samurai

- Lord: Matsudaira Hirotada → Tokugawa Ieyasu
- Born: 1528
- Died: February 13, 1597 (aged 68–69)
- Burial: Genku-ji Temple (Shibukawa, Gunma)
- Issue: 3, including Honda Yasushige
Era dates
- Sengoku – Azuchi–Momoyama
- Clan: Honda

Honda Hirotaka (本多 広孝; 1528 - February 3, 1598) was a Japanese samurai of the Sengoku period through Azuchi-Momoyama period, who served the Tokugawa clan.
