= Toda Tadamasa =

Japanese daimyō

Toda Tadamasa (戸田 忠昌; 1632 – October 2, 1699) was a Japanese daimyō of the early Edo period. He served in a variety of positions in the Tokugawa shogunate, including rōjū and Kyoto Shoshidai.

Preceded by Toda Tadayoshi	3rd (Toda) Daimyō of Tawara; 1647–1664	Succeeded by Miyake Yasukatsu
Preceded by Yamazaki Ieharu	1st (Toda) Daimyō of Amakusa; 1664–1671	Succeeded by none
Preceded by Itakura Shigetane	1st (Toda) Daimyō of Iwatsuki; 1682–1686	Succeeded by Matsudaira Tadachika
Preceded by Ōkubo Tadatomo	1st (Toda) Daimyō of Sakura; 1686–1699	Succeeded by Toda Tadazane
Preceded by Nagai Naotsune	7th Kyoto Shoshidai; 1678–1681	Succeeded by Inaba Masamichi
