= Honda Yasushige (daimyo, born 1554) =

Japanese samurai

Honda Yasushige (本多 康重) (1554 – May 4, 1611) was a Japanese samurai of the late Sengoku through early Edo period. The first lord of Okazaki han in Mikawa Province, he held the title of Bungo no Kami (豊後守). Yasushige served Tokugawa Ieyasu from a young age, taking part in various battles, such as the Battle of Anegawa and the fight against Takeda Shingen. After the Odawara Campaign, Yasushige moved into the Kantō region with Ieyasu, and received the 20,000 koku fief of Shiroi han. Following the Sekigahara Campaign, he was transferred to the 50,000 koku fief of Okazaki han in 1601. After his death on May 4, 1611, he was succeeded by his son Yasunori.

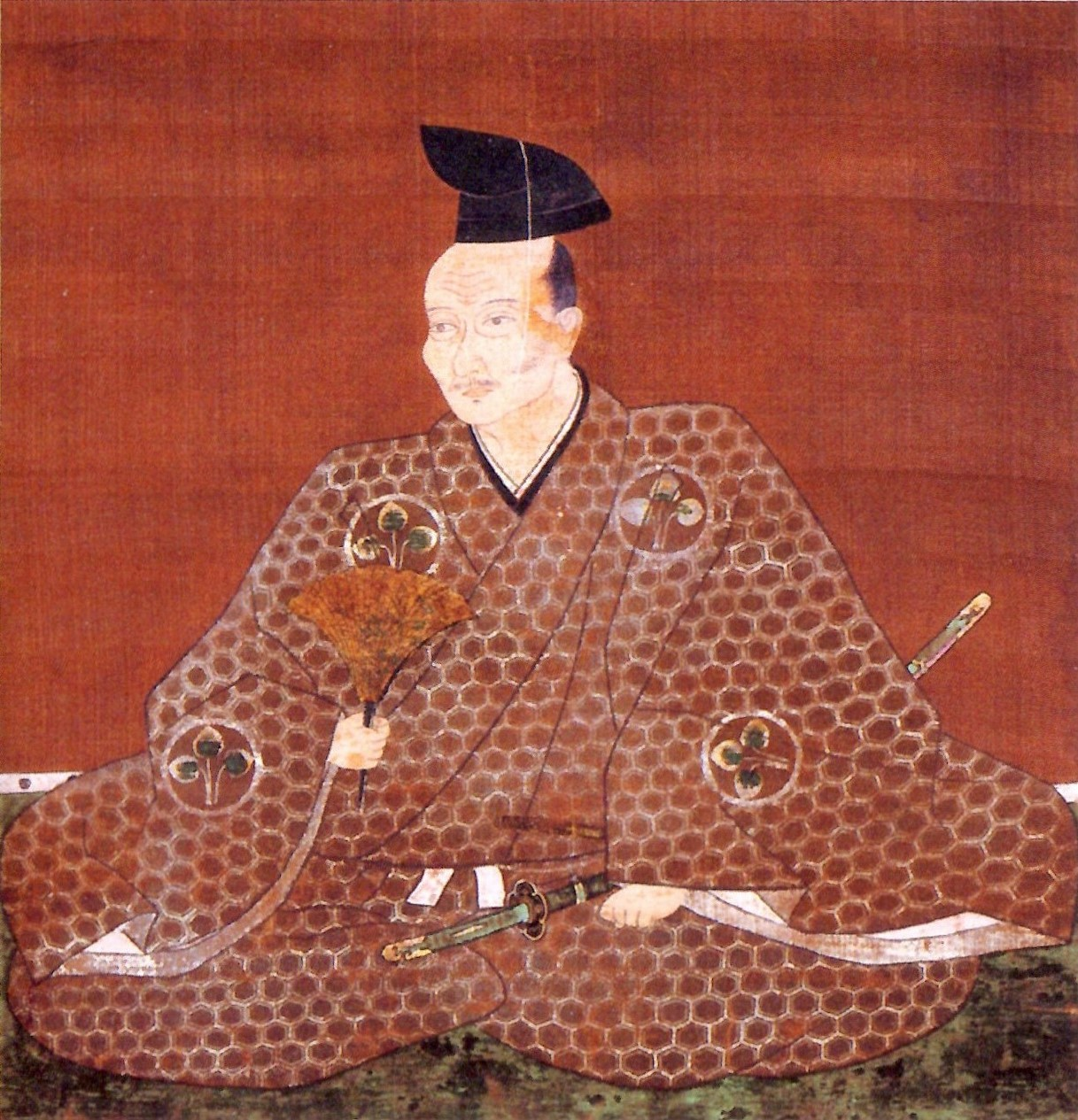
Honda Yasushige

Preceded by none	Lord of Shiroi; 1590–1601	Succeeded by Matsudaira Yasunaga
Preceded by none	Lord of Okazaki; 1601–1611	Succeeded by Honda Yasunori

== Resources ==
- Biographical data on Yasushige and his branch of the Honda (in Japanese)
- Okazaki Castle information (in Japanese)
