= Nukata Prefecture =

Former prefecture in Japan

Nukata Prefecture (額田県, Nukata-ken) was a prefecture in the Chūbu region of Japan, comprising the former Mikawa Province and the Chita Peninsula. It was merged into Aichi Prefecture on November 27, 1872.
