= Mikawa Province =

Former province of Japan

Map of Japanese provinces (1868) with Mikawa Province highlighted

Mikawa Province (三河国, Mikawa no Kuni; Japanese pronunciation: [mʲí.kä̀.β̞ä̀ (nò̞ kɯ̈̀.ɲ̟ì), mʲì.kä́.β̞ä́ (nò̞ kɯ̈̀.ɲ̟ì)]) was an old province in the area that today forms the eastern half of Aichi Prefecture. Its abbreviated form name was Sanshū (三州 or 参州). Mikawa bordered on Owari, Mino, Shinano, and Tōtōmi Provinces.

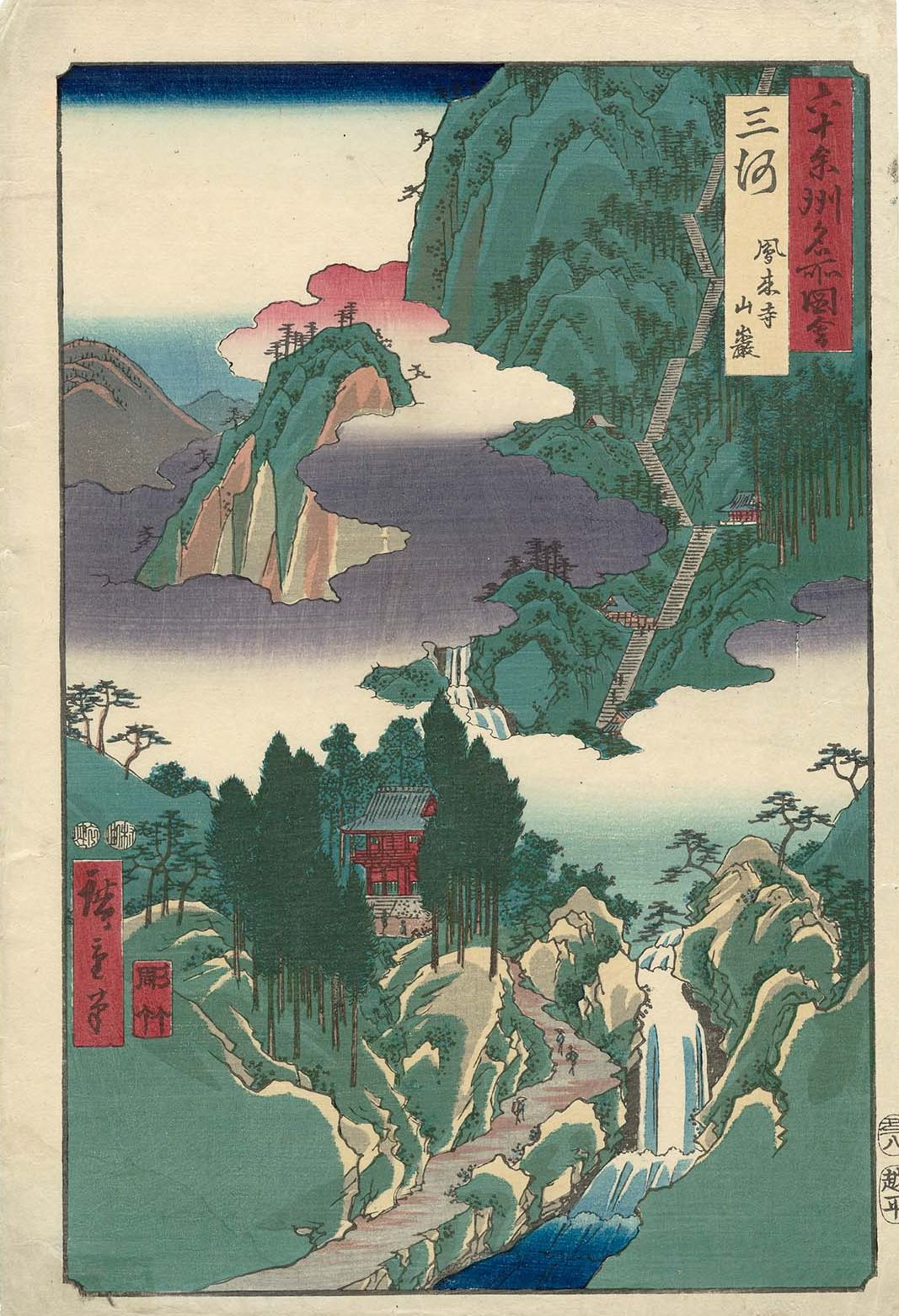
Hiroshige ukiyo-e "Mikawa" in "The Famous Scenes of the Sixty States" (六十余州名所図会), depicting the mountainous scenery around the temple of Hokai-ji, a popular pilgrimage destination in Mikawa

Mikawa is classified as one of the provinces of the Tōkaidō. Under the Engishiki classification system, Mikawa was ranked as a "superior country" (上国) and a "near country" (近国) in terms of its distance from the capital.

== History ==
Mikawa is mentioned in records of the Taika Reform dated 645, as well as various Nara period chronicles, including the Kujiki, although the area has been settled since at least the Japanese Paleolithic period, as evidenced by numerous remains found by archaeologists. Early records mention a "Nishi-Mikawa no kuni" and a "Higashi-Mikawa no kuni", also known as Ho Province (穂国, Ho no kuni). Although considered one administrative unit under the Engishiki classification system, this division (roughly based at the Yasaku River) persisted informally into the Edo period.

The exact location of the provincial capital is not known. Traditionally considered to have been located in the Ko-machi (国府町) area of the modern city of Toyokawa because of the place name, archaeological investigations at the Hakuho-machi area of Toyota from 1991 to 1997 have revealed extensive ruins and ceramic shards indicating the possibility that the provincial capital was located there. Furthermore, the ruins of the Kokubun-ji of Mikawa Province was located in 1999 a short distance away from the Toyota site. On the other hand, the Ichinomiya of the province, Toga jinja is located in what is now part of Toyokawa, as well as a temple which claims to be a successor to the original provincial temple.

During the Heian period, the province was divided into numerous shōen controlled by local samurai clans. During the Kamakura period but it came under the control of Adachi Morinaga, followed by the Ashikaga clan. For much of the Muromachi period it was controlled by the Isshiki clan. However, by the Sengoku period, the province had fragmented into many small territories largely dominated by the Matsudaira clan, and contested by the Imagawa clan to the east and the Oda clan to the west. It was united under Tokugawa Ieyasu after the power of the Imagawa had been destroyed at the Battle of Okehazama. After the creation of the Tokugawa shogunate, parts of the province were assigned as feudal domains to trusted hereditary retainers as fudai daimyōs, with large portions retained as shihaisho territory administered by various hatamoto directly under the shogunate. During the Edo period, Mikawa was the only area permitted by the shogunate to produce gunpowder, which led to its modern fireworks industry.

The various domains and tenryō territories were transformed into short-lived prefectures in July 1871 by the abolition of the han system, and was organized into ten districts by the early Meiji period cadastral reform of 1869. The entire territory of former Mikawa Province became part of the new Aichi Prefecture in January 1872.

After World War II, the territory of former Mikawa Province prospers as the capital of the Japanese automobile industry.

== Historical districts ==
Mikawa Province consisted of nine districts:

- Aichi Prefecture
  - Atsumi District (渥美郡) – dissolved
  - Hazu District (幡豆郡) – dissolved
  - Hekikai District (碧海郡) – dissolved
  - Hoi District (宝飯郡) – dissolved
  - Kamo District (加茂郡)
    - Higashikamo District (東加茂郡) – dissolved
    - Nishikamo District (西加茂郡) – dissolved
  - Nukata District (額田郡)
  - Shitara District (設楽郡)
    - Kitashitara District (北設楽郡)
    - Minamishitara District (南設楽郡) – dissolved

== Domains in Mikawa Province ==
Domains in Mikawa Province
Domain	Daimyō	Dates	Revenue (koku)	Type
Koromo Domain (挙母藩)	Naitō	1604–1871	20,000	fudai
Yoshida Domain (吉田藩)	Matsudaira (Nagasawa-Ōkōchi)	1600–1693	70,000	fudai
Tahara Domain (田原藩)	Miyake	1601–1871	12,000	fudai
Okazaki Domain (岡崎藩)	Honda	1601–1871	50,000	fudai
Nishio Domain (西尾藩)	Ogyū-Matsudaira clan	1638–1827	60,000	fudai
Kariya Domain (刈屋藩)	Doi	1600–1868	23,000	fudai
Nishi-Ōhira Domain (西大平藩)	Ōoka	1748–1871	10,000	fudai
Okutono Domain (奥殿藩)	Ogyū-Matsudaira clan	1664–1871	16,000	fudai
Hatagamura Domain (畑ヶ村藩)	Toda clan (subsidiary of Ōgaki Domain)	1688–1871	10,000	fudai

== Sports ==
SeaHorses Mikawa and SAN-EN NeoPhoenix play in the B.League, Japan's first division of professional basketball.
