= Irago Tōdai-ji Tile Kiln ruins =

Archaeological site in Japan

- 伊良湖東大寺瓦窯跡 (Japanese)
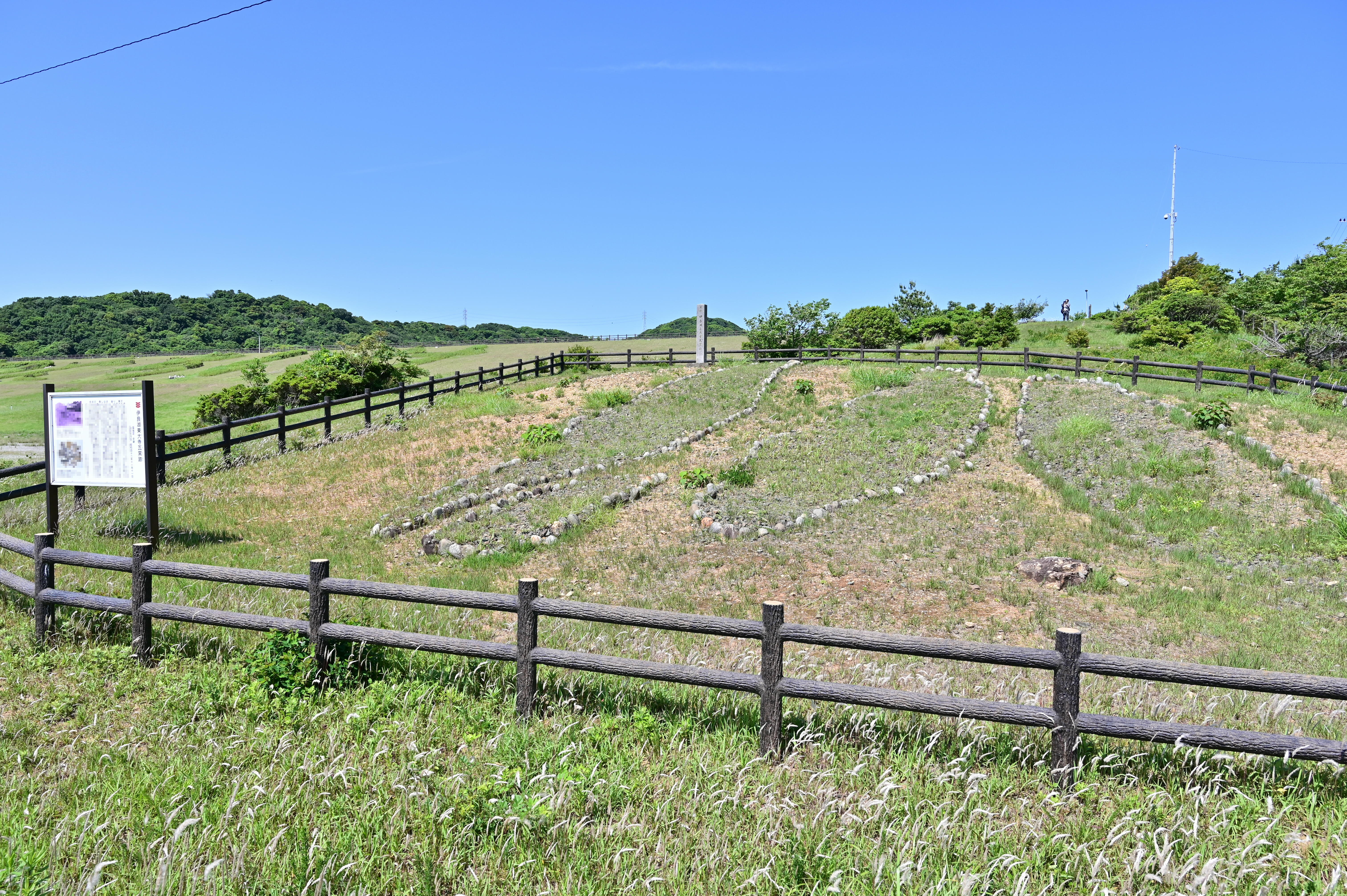
- Irago Tōdai-ji Tile Kiln ruins

- Irago Tōdai-ji Tile Kiln ruins Irago Tōdai-ji Tile Kiln ruins (Japan)
- 34°35′42″N 137°03′23″E
- Type: kiln ruins
- Periods: Kamakura period
- Location: Tahara, Aichi, Japan
- Region: Tōkai region

Site notes
- Public access: Yes (no public facilities)

The Irago Tōdai-ji Tile Kiln ruins (伊良湖東大寺瓦窯跡, Irago Tōdaiji gayō iseki) is an archaeological site containing the remnants of a number of Anagama kilns, from which the roof tiles for the Kamakura period reconstruction of the temple of Tōdai-ji in Nara were made. The site is located in the Irago neighborhood of the city of Tahara, Aichi Prefecture in the Tōkai region of Japan. It was designated a National Historic Site of Japan in 1967.

== Overview ==
In 1180 AD, during the Genpei War of the late Heian period, the great temple of Tōdai-ji was burned down by Heike forces. The temple was rebuilt by the Kamakura shogunate in 1195 AD. During the construction of the Hatsutachiike irrigation dam at the tip of Atsumi Peninsula in 1966, the remnants of a kiln were discovered. This lent evidence to local legend that the tiles for the temple of Tōdai-ji had been produced from clay in this area. Further investigation of shards found at the site, as well as earlier finds from the Edo period in this neighborhood, revealed a number of ink markings and inscriptions which were identical to markings on existing tiles preserved at Tōdai-ji. A more detailed archaeological excavation revealed that the site consisted of three noborigama-style kilns and one flat kiln.

The kilns were from 11.5 to 12.3 meters in length, and had a maximum width of 2.5 meters. Excavated items are now displayed at the Folklore Museum of Tahara City. The site is located a 20-minute walk from the "Kameyama Nishi" bus stop on the Toyotetsu Bus from the Mikawa Tahara Station on the Toyohashi Railroad Atsumi Line.

== See also ==
- List of Historic Sites of Japan (Aichi)
