= Ōarako Old Kiln ruins =

Archeological site in Japan

- 大アラコ古窯跡 (Japanese)
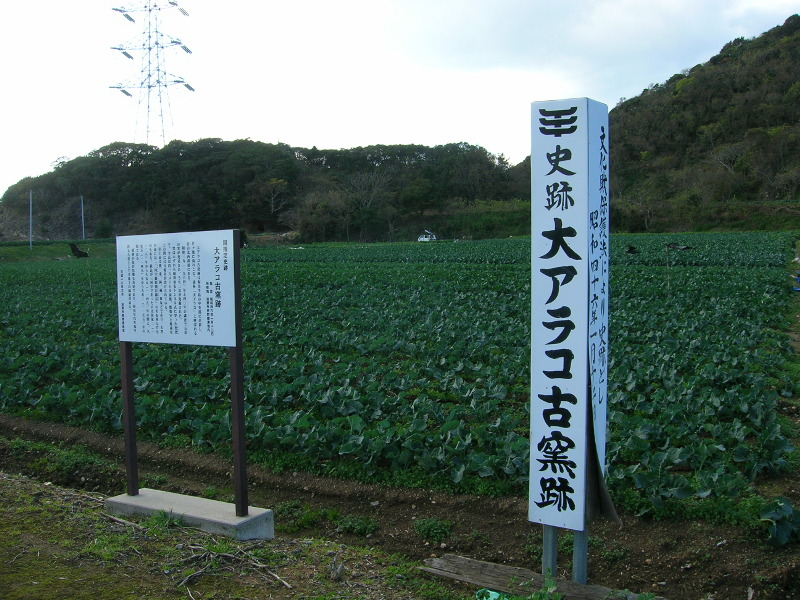
- Ōarako Old Kiln ruins

- Ōarako Old Kiln ruins Ōarako Old Kiln ruins (Japan)
- 34°38′05″N 137°11′43″E
- Type: kiln
- Periods: Heian - Kamakura
- Location: Tahara, Aichi, Japan
- Region: Tōkai region

Site notes
- Public access: Yes (no public facilities)

The Ōarako Old Kiln Site (大アラコ古窯跡, Ōarako ko-yōseki) is an archaeological site containing the ruins of five noborigama-style kilns located in the Ashimura neighborhood of the city of Tahara, Aichi in the Tōkai region of Japan. The kilns were built in the late Heian period and were in use into the Kamakura period The site was designated a National Historic Site of Japan in 1971.

== Overview ==
The kiln ruins are located in a valley southwest of Ashigaike in the central part of the Atsumi Peninsula. Until the discovery of this site 1950s, it was not known that pottery had been made on the Atsumi Peninsula. With the archaeological excavation of this large kiln site by the Tahara Town Board of Education in 1964, it became clear that a type of black pottery of unknown origin which had been discovered in many locations in the Tōkai region originated from this location. A total of eight kiln traces were discovered. Pottery produced at the Ōarako site was used for everyday items, such as large storage containers, tea bowls and funerary urns.

Some of the pottery shards discovered at this site bore the name of "Fujiwara Okinaga", who was the kokushi of Mikawa Province from 1136 to 1155. The excavated items are stored in the Aichi Prefectural Ceramic Museum located in Seto.

The site is located a 50-minute walk from the "Noda" bus stop on the Toyotetsu Bus from Mikawa-Tahara Station on the Toyohashi Railroad Atsumi Line; however, as the ruins were backfilled after excavation, there is nothing to see at this location.

== See also ==
- List of Historic Sites of Japan (Aichi)
