= Tahara, Aichi =

Tahara 田原市
- City
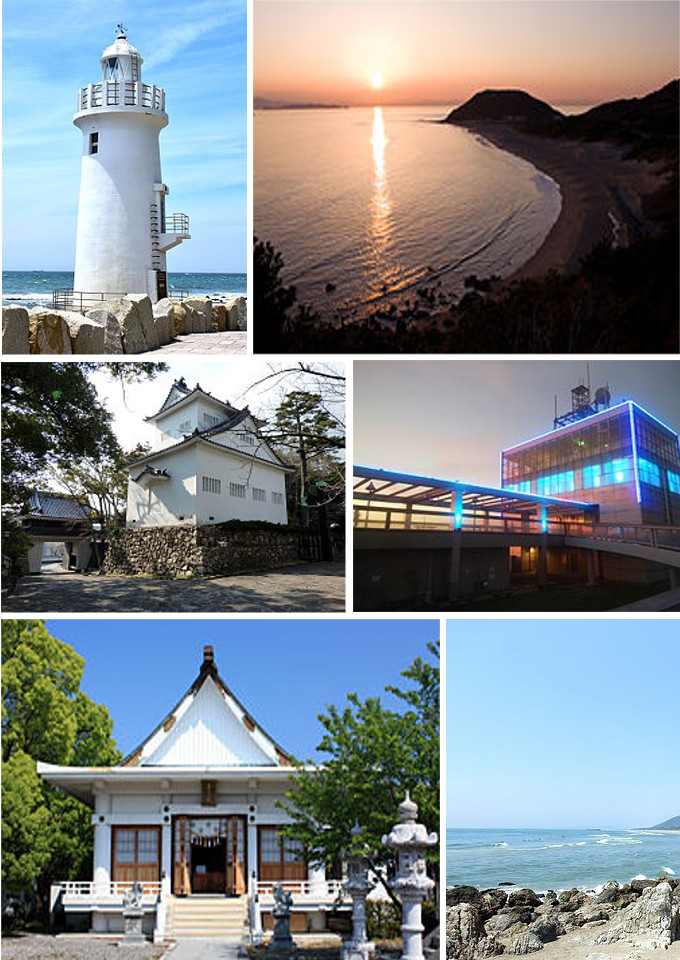
- Upper: Iragomisaki Lighthouse, Cape Iragomi; Middle: Tahara Castle, Mt Zao Lookout; Lower:Kazan Jinja, Akahane Beach

- Flag Coat of arms
- Location of Tahara in Aichi Prefecture

- Coordinates: 34°40′7.5″N 137°16′51.2″E
- Country: Japan
- Region: Chūbu (Tōkai)
- Prefecture: Aichi

Area
  - Total: 191.12 km^{2} (73.79 sq mi)

Population (October 1, 2019)
  - Total: 60,206
  - Density: 315.02/km^{2} (815.89/sq mi)
- Time zone: UTC+9 (Japan Standard Time)
- Phone number: 0531-22-1111
- Address: 30-1 Minami Banba, Tahara-cho, Tahara-shi, Aichi-ken 441-3492
- Climate: Cfa
- Website: Official website
- Symbols
- Flower: Broccolini
- Tree: Cinnamomum camphora

Tahara (田原市, Tahara-shi) is a city in Aichi Prefecture, Japan. As of 1 October 2019, the city had an estimated population of 60,206 in 22,576 households, and a population density of 315 persons per km^{2}. The total area of the city is 191.12 square kilometres (73.79 sq mi).

== Geography ==
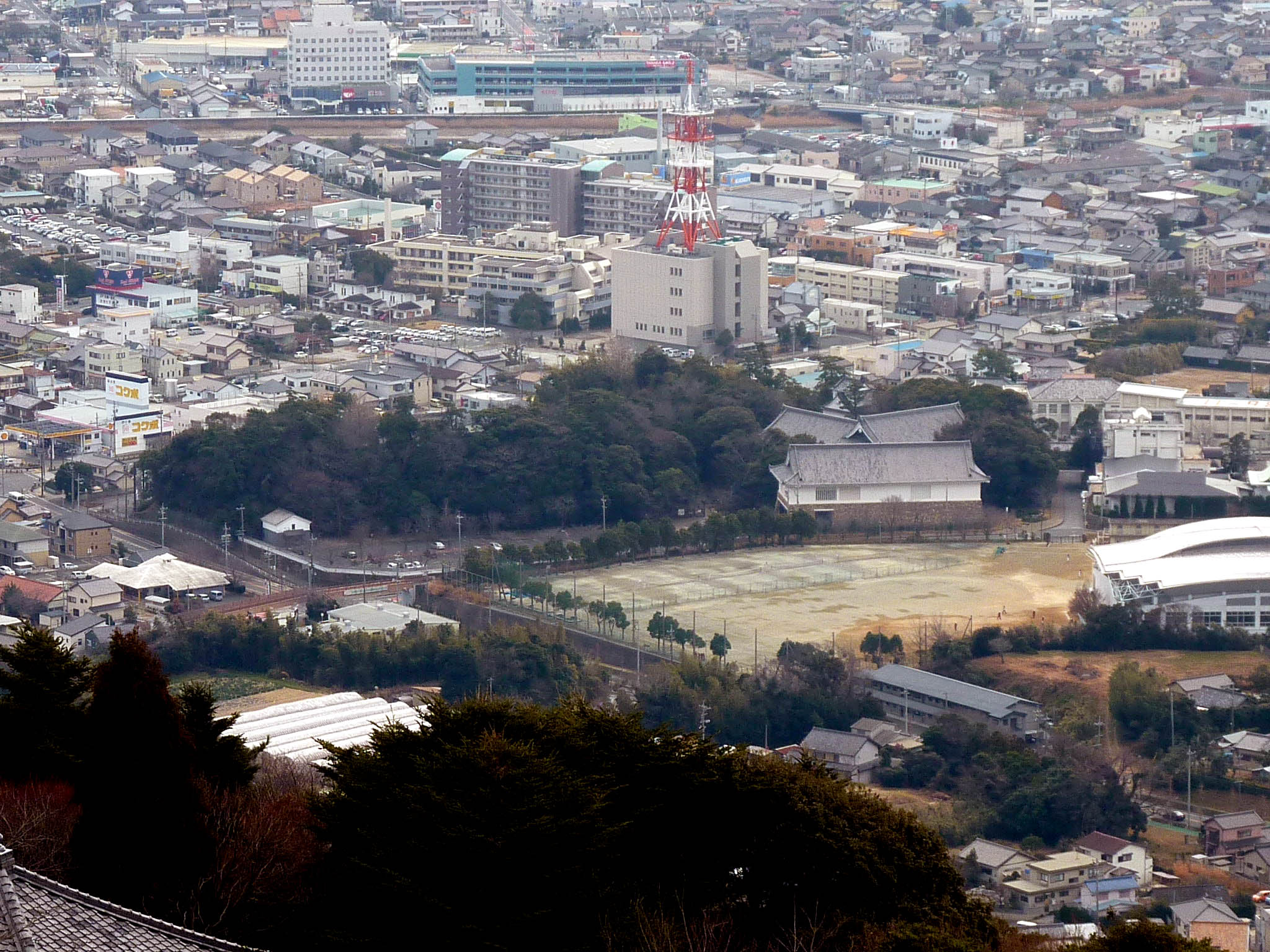
View of Central Tahara from Mount Zao

Tahara is situated in southern Aichi Prefecture, and occupies most of the hilly Atsumi Peninsula. The peninsula is bounded on the north by Mikawa Bay and to the south lies the Enshū Sea. Situated as it is between those two bodies of water, Tahara has a warm maritime climate.

=== Climate ===
The city has a climate characterized by hot and humid summers, and relatively mild winters (Köppen climate classification Cfa). The average annual temperature in Tahara is 16.4 °C (61.5 °F). The average annual rainfall is 1,642.1 mm (64.65 in) with September as the wettest month. The temperatures are highest on average in August, at around 27.4 °C (81.3 °F), and lowest in January, at around 6.0 °C (42.8 °F).

Climate data for Cape Irago, Tahara (1991−2020 normals, extremes 1947−present)
Month	Jan	Feb	Mar	Apr	May	Jun	Jul	Aug	Sep	Oct	Nov	Dec	Year
Record high °C (°F)	17.5 (63.5)	21.4 (70.5)	24.0 (75.2)	28.2 (82.8)	31.3 (88.3)	36.3 (97.3)	38.1 (100.6)	38.4 (101.1)	35.9 (96.6)	30.8 (87.4)	25.2 (77.4)	23.4 (74.1)	38.4 (101.1)
Mean maximum °C (°F)	14.2 (57.6)	16.5 (61.7)	19.7 (67.5)	24.3 (75.7)	28.4 (83.1)	31.2 (88.2)	34.7 (94.5)	35.3 (95.5)	32.6 (90.7)	27.6 (81.7)	22.1 (71.8)	17.5 (63.5)	35.8 (96.4)
Mean daily maximum °C (°F)	9.4 (48.9)	10.2 (50.4)	13.7 (56.7)	18.8 (65.8)	23.1 (73.6)	26.0 (78.8)	30.0 (86.0)	31.6 (88.9)	28.1 (82.6)	22.7 (72.9)	17.2 (63.0)	11.9 (53.4)	20.2 (68.4)
Daily mean °C (°F)	6.0 (42.8)	6.3 (43.3)	9.4 (48.9)	14.3 (57.7)	18.8 (65.8)	22.2 (72.0)	26.1 (79.0)	27.4 (81.3)	24.4 (75.9)	19.1 (66.4)	13.6 (56.5)	8.6 (47.5)	16.3 (61.4)
Mean daily minimum °C (°F)	2.9 (37.2)	2.9 (37.2)	5.4 (41.7)	10.1 (50.2)	15.0 (59.0)	19.2 (66.6)	23.3 (73.9)	24.5 (76.1)	21.5 (70.7)	16.0 (60.8)	10.1 (50.2)	5.2 (41.4)	13.0 (55.4)
Mean minimum °C (°F)	−1.1 (30.0)	−0.8 (30.6)	0.6 (33.1)	4.0 (39.2)	10.0 (50.0)	14.9 (58.8)	20.0 (68.0)	21.2 (70.2)	16.7 (62.1)	10.6 (51.1)	5.0 (41.0)	0.7 (33.3)	−1.6 (29.1)
Record low °C (°F)	−4.4 (24.1)	−4.0 (24.8)	−3.0 (26.6)	1.2 (34.2)	6.2 (43.2)	12.1 (53.8)	15.3 (59.5)	16.8 (62.2)	12.3 (54.1)	6.4 (43.5)	2.1 (35.8)	−3.6 (25.5)	−4.4 (24.1)
Average precipitation mm (inches)	61.9 (2.44)	68.3 (2.69)	121.5 (4.78)	138.8 (5.46)	163.5 (6.44)	179.6 (7.07)	159.6 (6.28)	115.5 (4.55)	240.6 (9.47)	223.9 (8.81)	106.0 (4.17)	63.1 (2.48)	1,642.1 (64.65)
Average precipitation days (≥ 1.0 mm)	5.4	5.9	8.5	9.4	9.7	11.6	9.8	6.7	10.6	10.1	6.4	5.6	99.7
Average relative humidity (%)	63	63	65	68	73	80	82	79	77	72	69	66	71
Mean monthly sunshine hours	180.1	176.1	201.3	201.3	205.1	155.5	194.4	234.2	169.0	164.1	166.0	174.9	2,222
Source: Japan Meteorological Agency

=== Demographics ===
Per Japanese census data, the population of Tahara has been relatively steady over the past 60 years.

Historical population
Year	Pop.	±%
1950	65,095	—
1960	59,120	−9.2%
1970	56,248	−4.9%
1980	60,581	+7.7%
1990	64,978	+7.3%
2000	65,534	+0.9%
2010	64,128	−2.1%

=== Neighboring municipalities ===
Aichi Prefecture

- Toyohashi

== History ==
=== Origin ===
The area of present-day Tahara has been continuously occupied since prehistoric times. Archaeologists have found numerous remains from the Jōmon period and burial mounds from the Kofun period.

=== Ancient history ===
During the Nara period, the area was assigned to ancient Atsumi County, and was divided into several shōen during the Heian period.

=== Feudal period ===
During the Kamakura period, the area was noted for production of a certain type of pottery.

During the Sengoku period, the area was under the control of the Toda clan, who constructed Tahara Castle.

=== Early modern period ===
The Toda, who were allied with Tokugawa Ieyasu were dispossessed by Toyotomi Hideyoshi, but returned as daimyō of Tahara Domain at the start of the Edo period. The Toda were later replaced by the Miyake clan, who ruled until the end of the Tokugawa shogunate. The noted scholar Watanabe Kazan was from Tahara.

=== Late modern period ===
At the start of the Meiji period, on October 1, 1889, Tahara was organized into a number of villages within Atsumi District, Aichi Prefecture with the establishment of the modern municipalities system. Tahara Village was elevated to town status on October 3, 1892, and Fukue village became Fukue Town on February 22, 1897.

=== Contemporary history ===
Fukue later changed its name to Atsumi Town on April 15, 1955. On November 11, 1958, the village of Akabane was raised to town status.

The city of Tahara was established on August 20, 2003, from the merger the former town of Tahara, absorbing the town of Akabane (both from Atsumi District) to elevate city status. On October 1, 2005, the town of Atsumi (also from Atsumi District) was merged into Tahara. Therefore, Atsumi District was dissolved as a result of this merger.

== Government ==
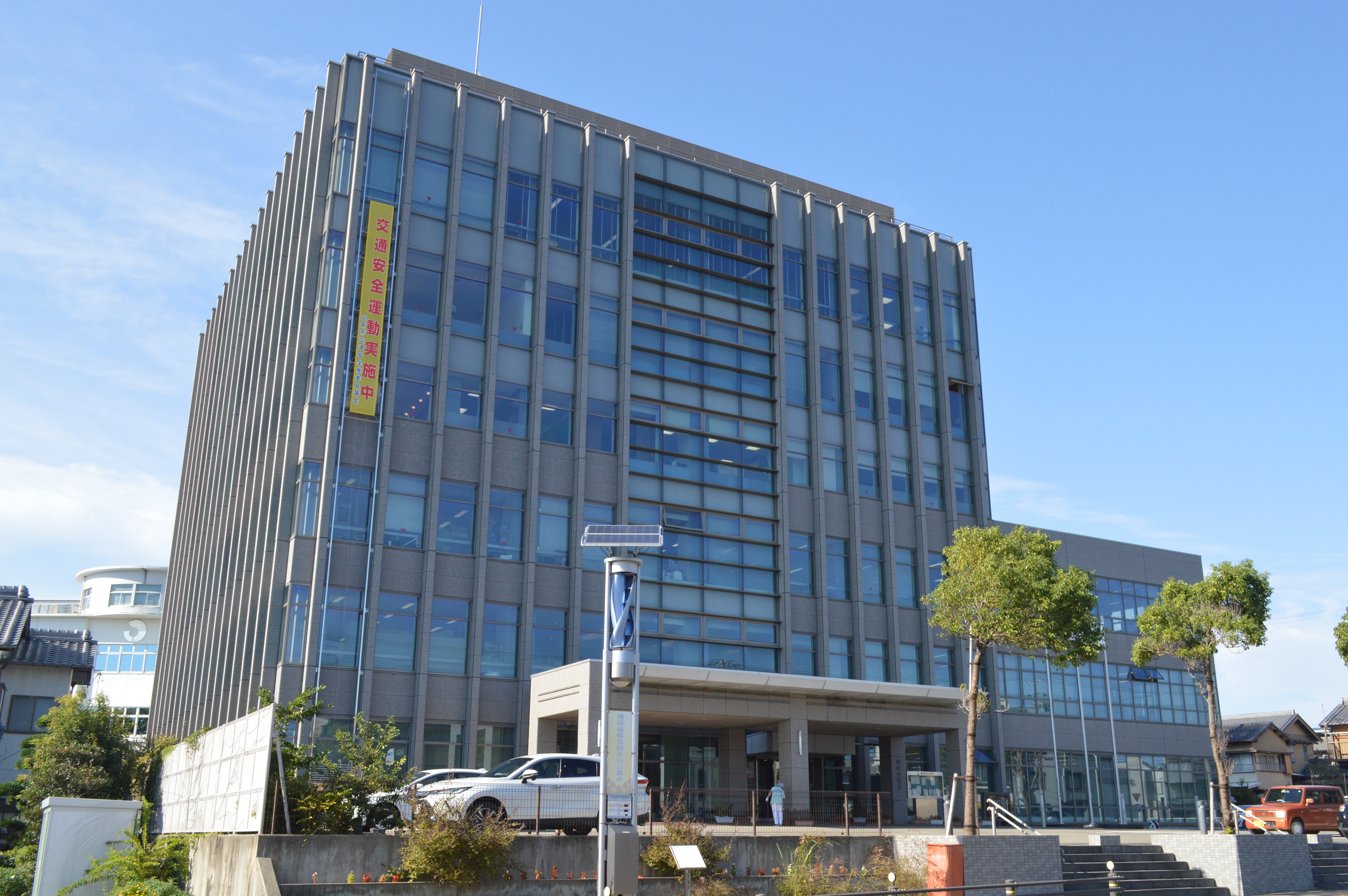
Tahara City Hall

Tahara has a mayor-council form of government with a directly elected mayor and a unicameral city legislature of 18 members. The city contributes one member to the Aichi Prefectural Assembly. In terms of national politics, the city is part of Aichi District 15 of the lower house of the Diet of Japan.

== Sister cities ==
=== International ===
Sister cities

- Georgetown, Kentucky, United States, since April 20, 1990
- Princeton, Indiana, United States, since August 8, 2002

Friendship cities

- Kunshan, Jiangsu, China, since May 14, 1993
- Dongjak-gu, Seoul, South Korea, since December 2006

=== National ===
Friendship cities

- Shitara, Aichi Prefecture, since Marchi 24, 1999
- Miyata, Nagano Prefecture, since November 9, 1999

== Economy ==
Tahara is a regional commercial center with a mixed economy of manufacturing and agriculture. Due to its long coastline, Tahara has many ports for commercial fishing.

=== Secondary sector of the economy ===
==== Manufacturing ====
The main industrial employer is Toyota, which has its award-winning Tahara plant in Tahara which makes many Lexus cars and some Toyota models. The Toyota Celica was manufactured in Tahara from 1979 to 1999. Many Lexus models are manufactured within this plant, as are many Toyota models for domestic and international markets.

== Lifeline ==
=== Energy ===
Tahara has a consortium of companies investing in renewable energy needs. As of November 2014, a new solar energy and wind energy power generation facility will provide 19,000 households with electricity on an infrequent basis that is dependent upon the weather. JERA operates the Atsumi Thermal Power Station, an oil-fired power plant with capacity of 1400 MW in Tahara.

== Education ==
=== Schools ===
Tahara has 18 public elementary schools, five public middle schools operated by the city government and three public high schools operated by the Aichi Prefectural Board of Education.

== Transportation ==
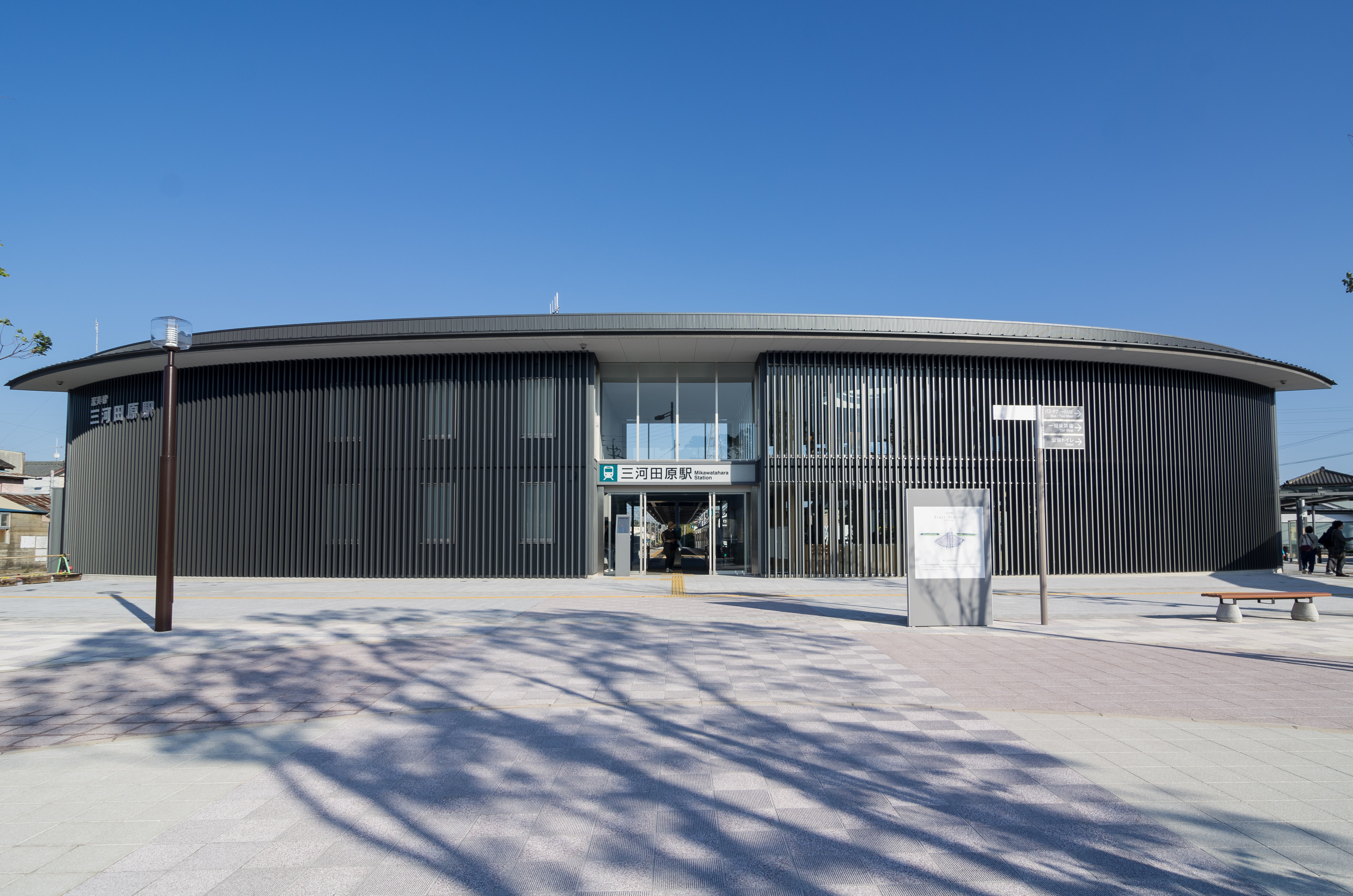
Mikawa Tahara Station

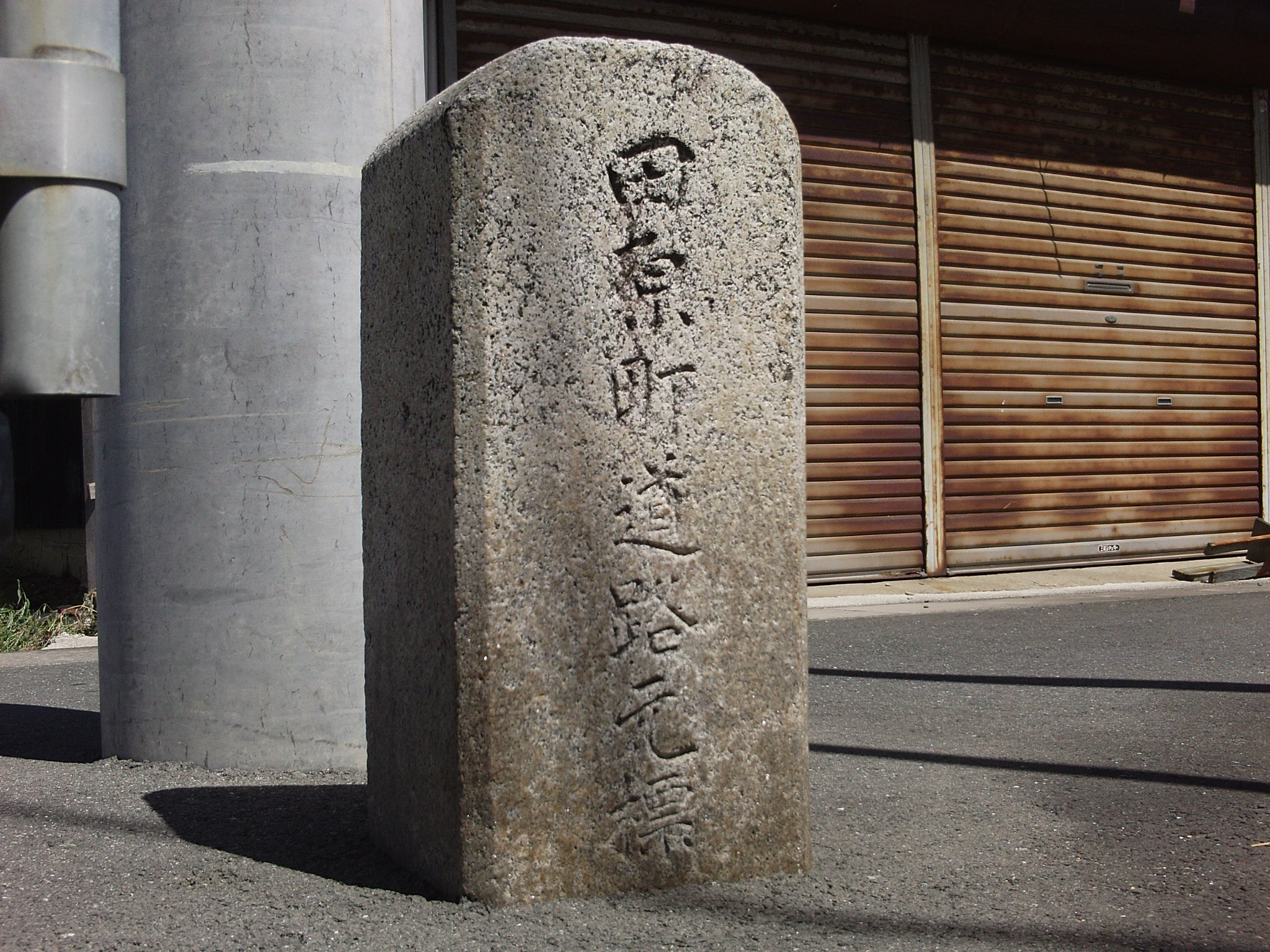
The Kilometre Zero of Tahara

=== Railways ===
==== Conventional lines ====
Toyohashi Railroad

- Atsumi Line: - Yagumadai – Toshima – Kambe – Mikawa Tahara

=== Bus ===
==== Bus services ====
Toyotetsu buses and city-operated environmentally friendly public transport facilitate access throughout Tahara, even to the westernmost point at Cape Irago.

=== Roads ===
==== Japan National Route ====
- National Route 259 is the main highway that runs the length of Atsumi Peninsula. An alternate reading of the kanji in this highway numeral designation is ji-go-ku. In Japanese, the word jigoku means Hell, and thus some locals refer to it as ji-go-ku-douro, or the "Highway to Hell". This term was encouraged by the perception of a higher fatality rate along the road, especially before it was widened and improved.
- National Route 42

=== Seaways ===
==== Seaports ====
From the Port of Irago, the Ise-wan Ferry connects Tahara with the town of Toba, Mie prefecture. The ferry can accommodate motor vehicles. The ferry also docks at the Central Japan International Airport, built on an artificial island in Ise Bay, south of Nagoya.

== Local attractions ==
- Akabane Long Beach, also known as "Akabane Beach" or "Long Beach", is a very scenic area for locals and tourists. The Akabane Beach hosted the 2018 World Surfing Games, among other international surfing competitions over the years.
- Irago Tōdai-ji Tile Kiln ruins, Kamakura-period kiln ruins, a National Historic Site
- Kazan Jinja
- Kojigahama Beach, Cape Irago, the wave sounds of which were listed as one of the 100 Soundscapes of Japan by the Ministry of the Environment
- Ōarako Old Kiln ruins, a National Historic Site
- Site of Tahara Castle
- Yoshigo Shell Midden, a Jōmon period shell midden and National Historic Site
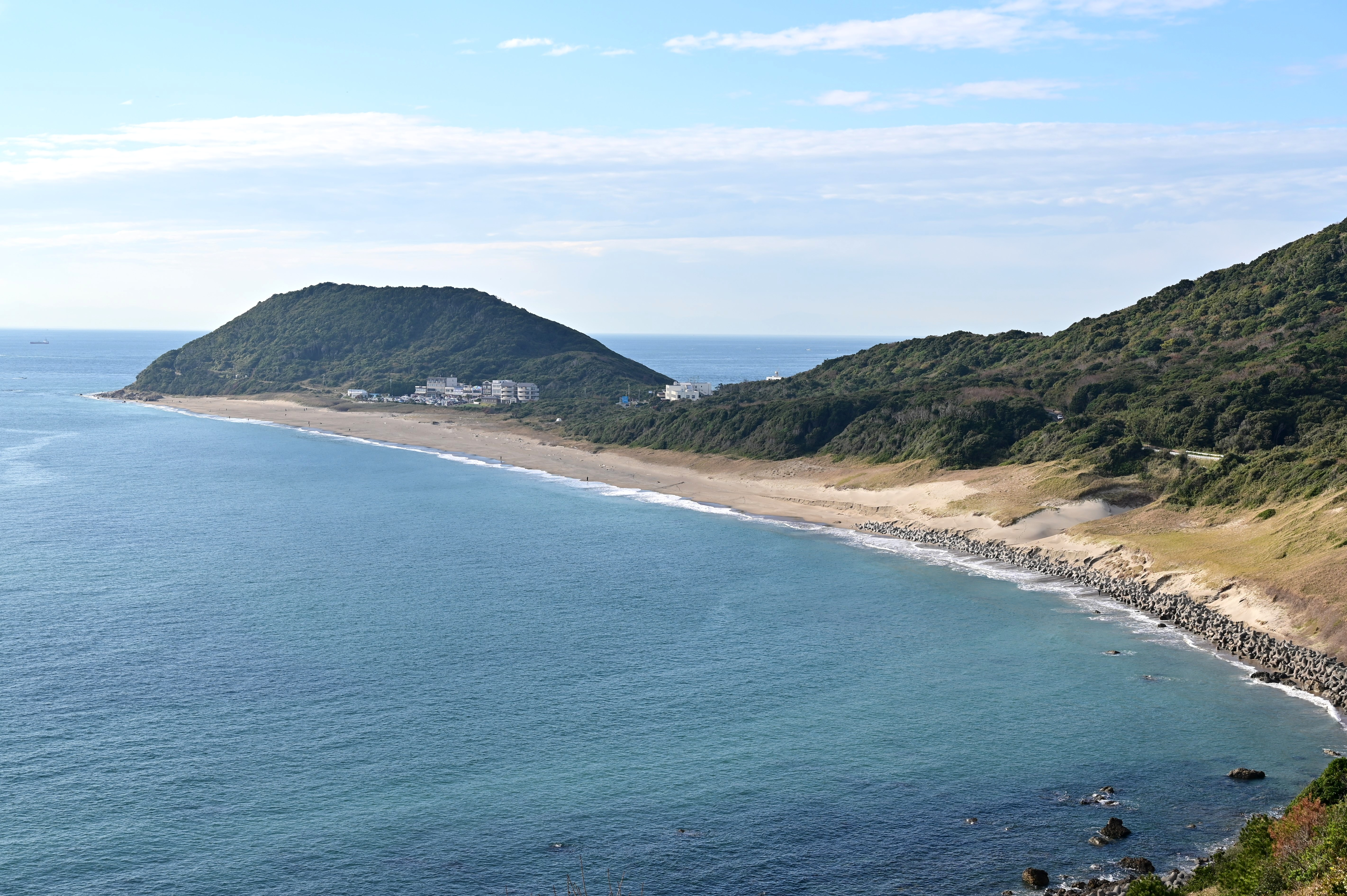
Cape Irago

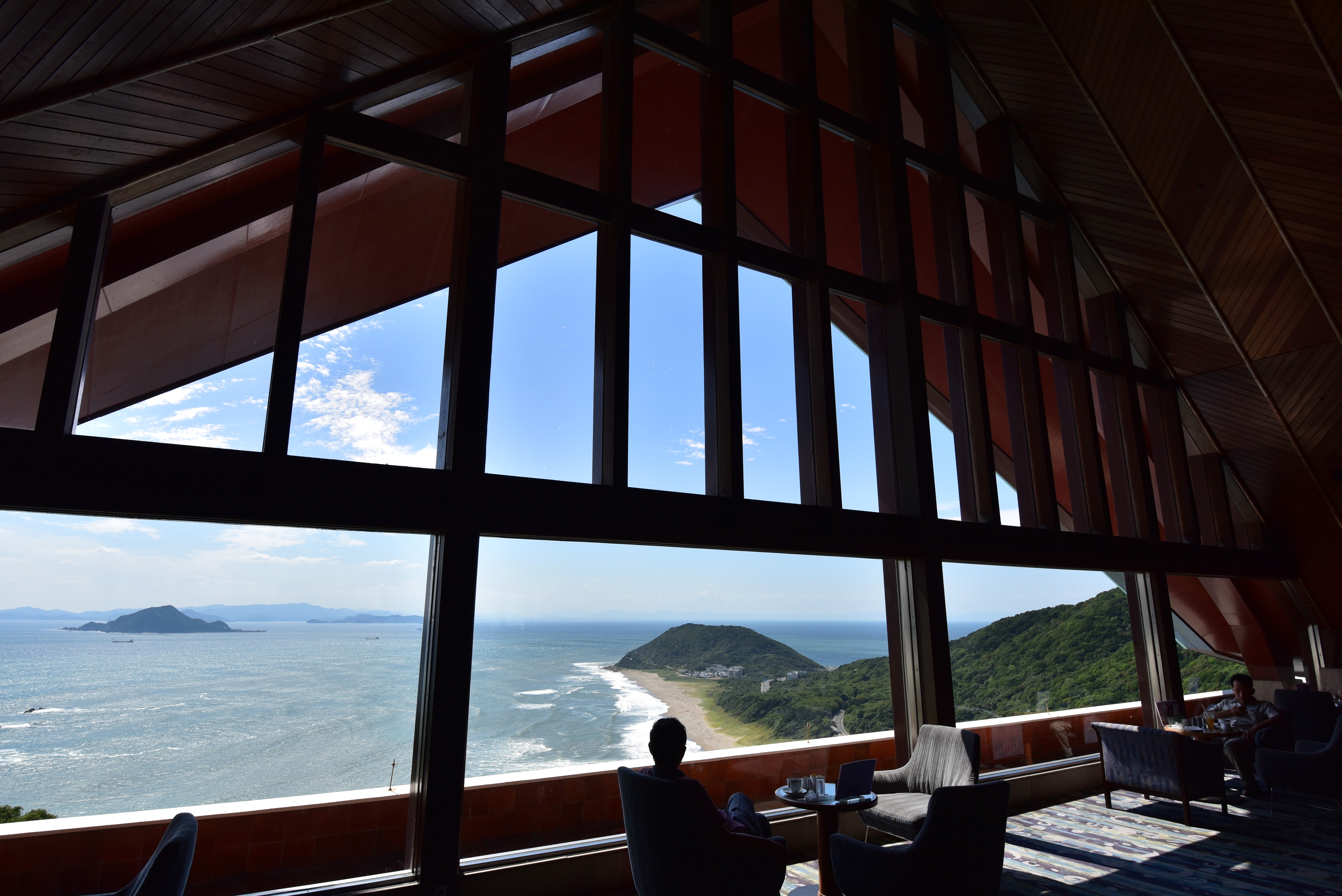
View of Cape Irago from Irako View Hotel

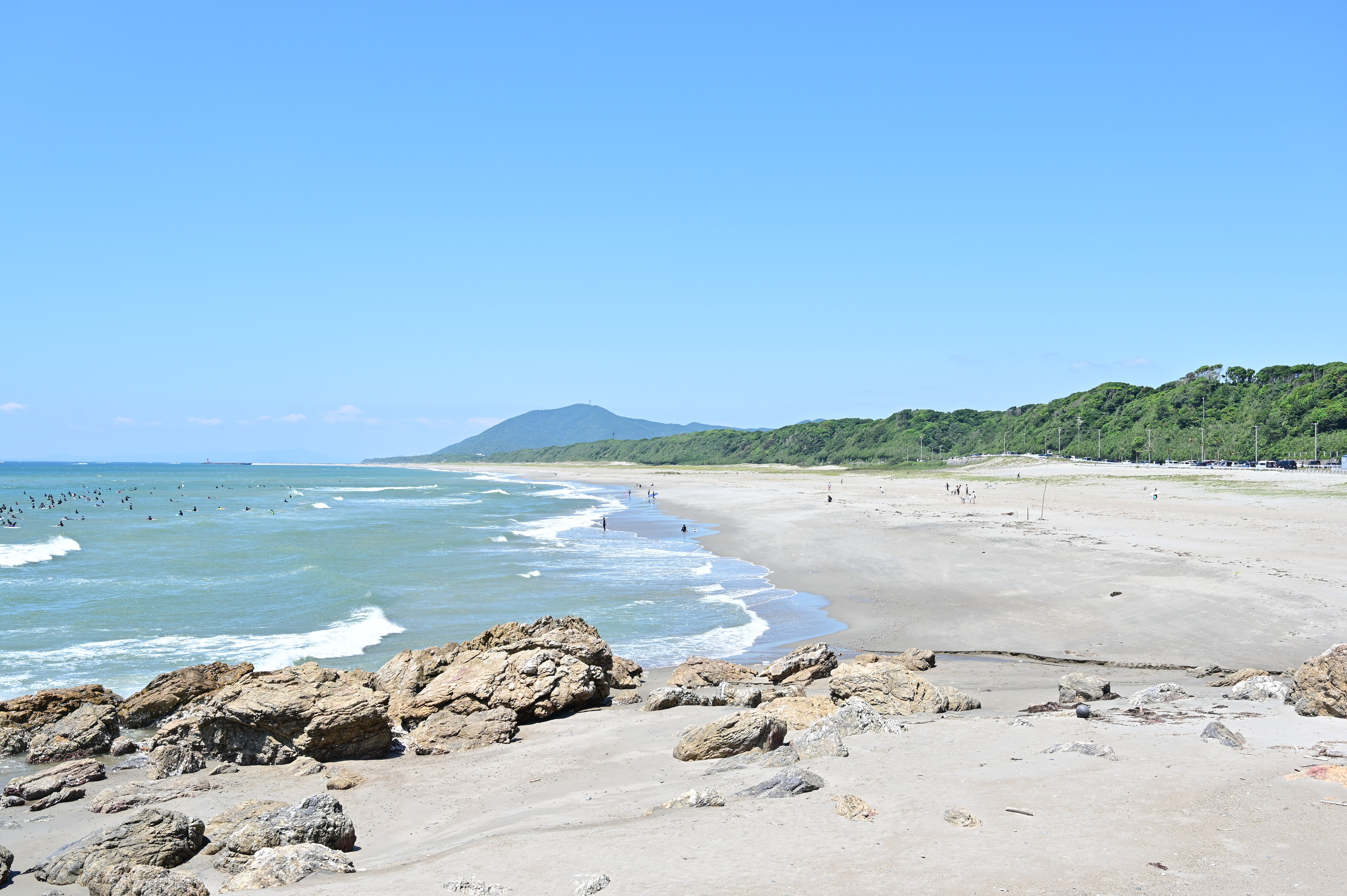
Akabane Long Beach

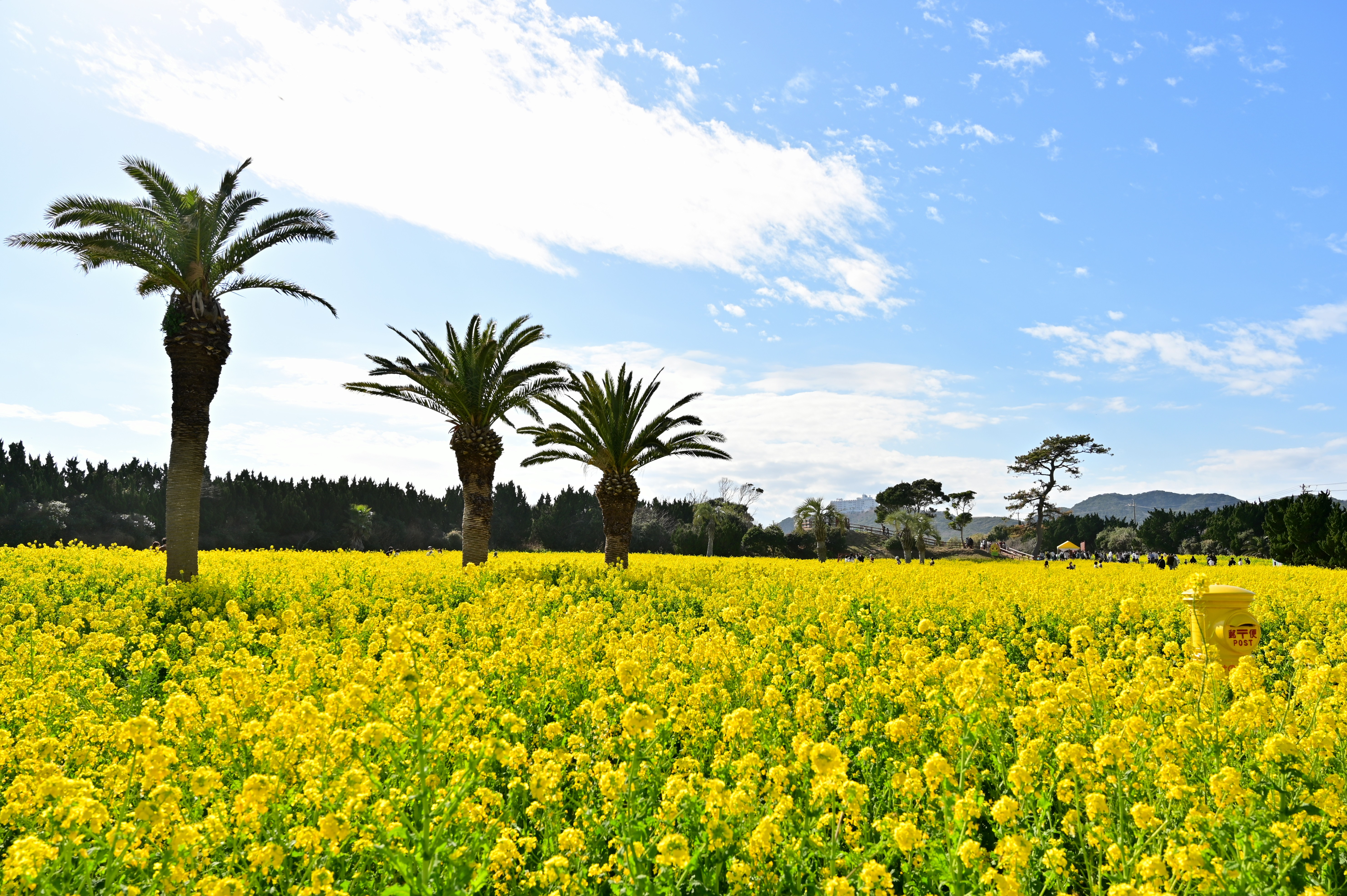
Rape Blossoms

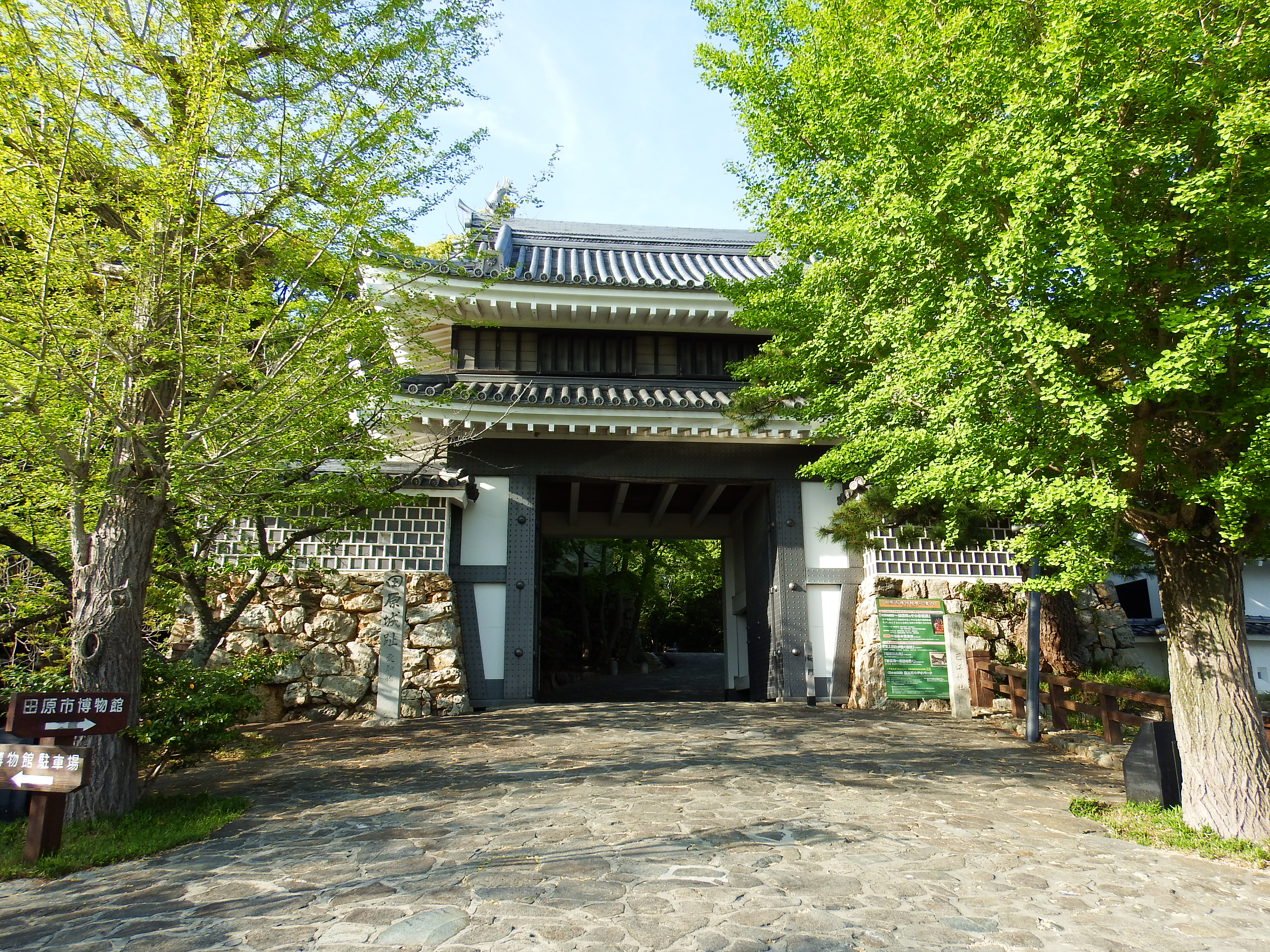
Tahara Castle

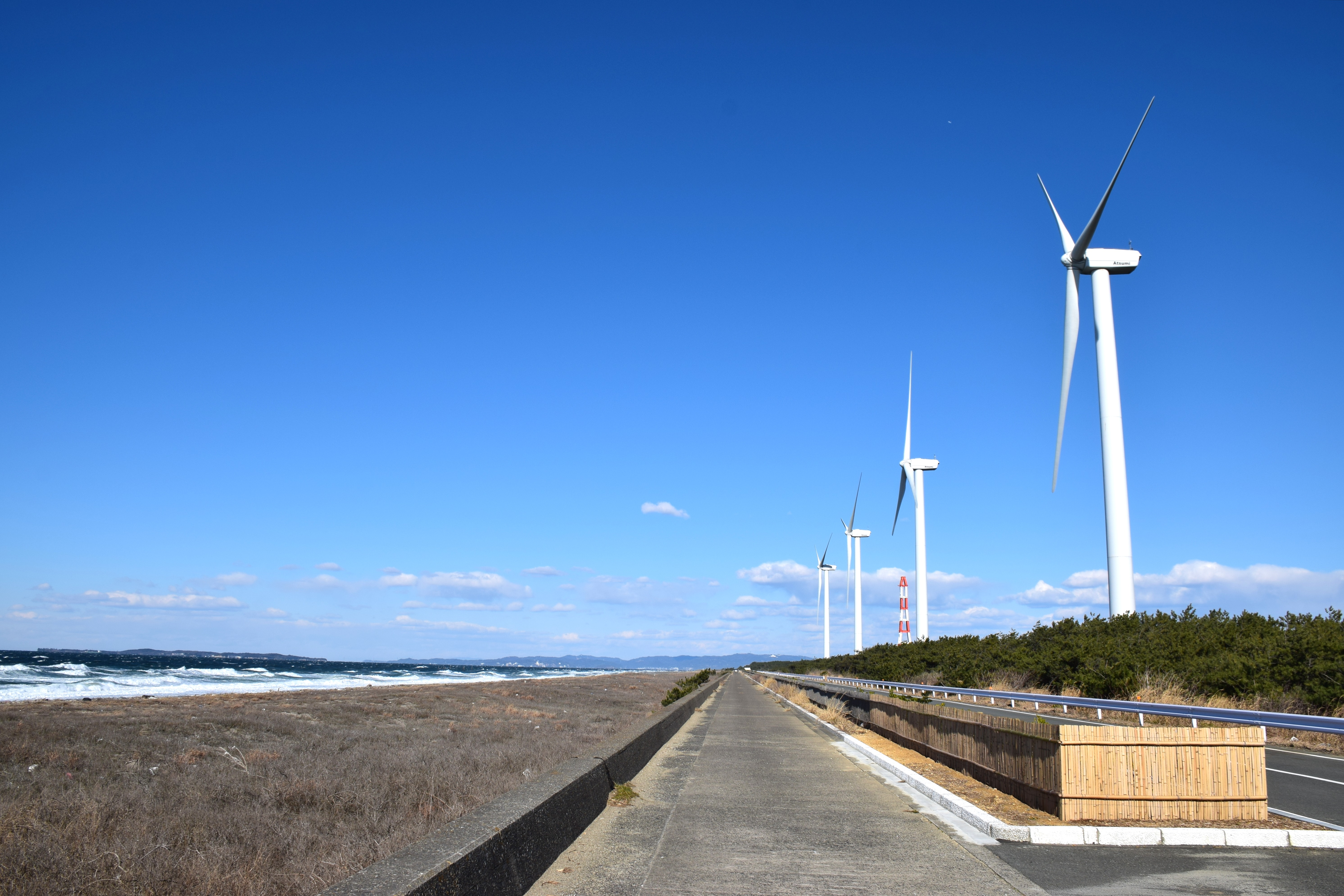
Nishinohama Wind Farm

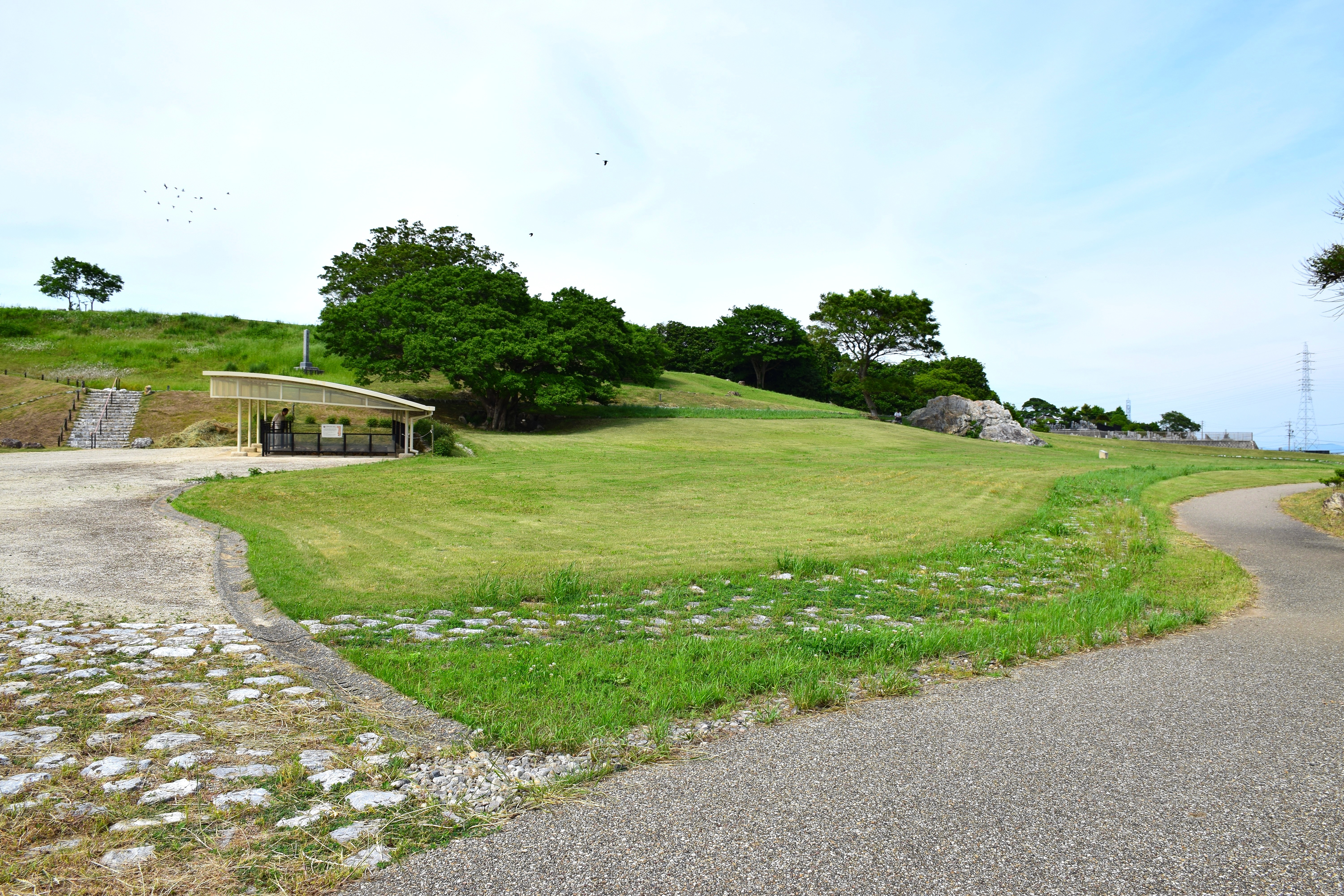
Yoshigo Kaizuka

== Notable people ==
- Watanabe Kazan, Edo period samurai and artist
- Kayoko Okubo, comedian
- Noboru Ueda, motorcycle racer
