= Toyohashi Railroad Azumada Main Line =

Tram line in Aichi prefecture, Japan

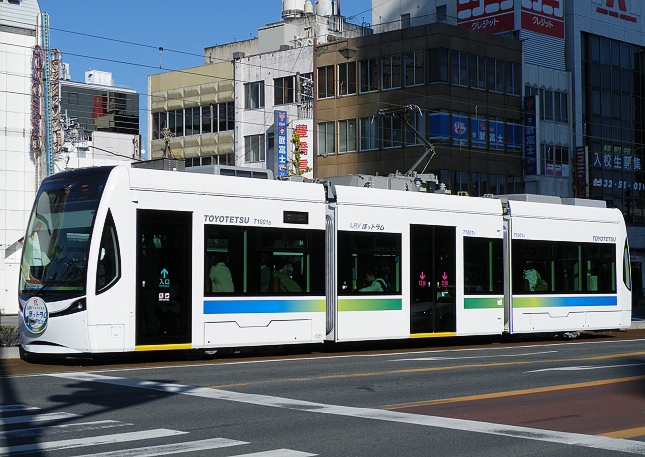
- Type T1000 Hottoram, January 2009

Overview
- Native name: 豊橋鉄道東田本線
- Owner: Toyohashi Electric Railway → Toyohashi Traffic → Toyohashi Railroad
- Termini: Ekimae; Akaiwa-guchi, Undoukoen-mae
- Stations: 14
- Website: http://www.toyotetsu.com/shinaisen/ Official site

History
- Opened: 14 July 1925; 100 years ago
- Last extension: 19 February 1998

Technical
- Line length: 5.4 km (3.4 mi)
- Track gauge: 1,067 mm (3 ft 6 in)
- Minimum radius: 11 m (36 ft)
- Electrification: 600 V DC
Route map
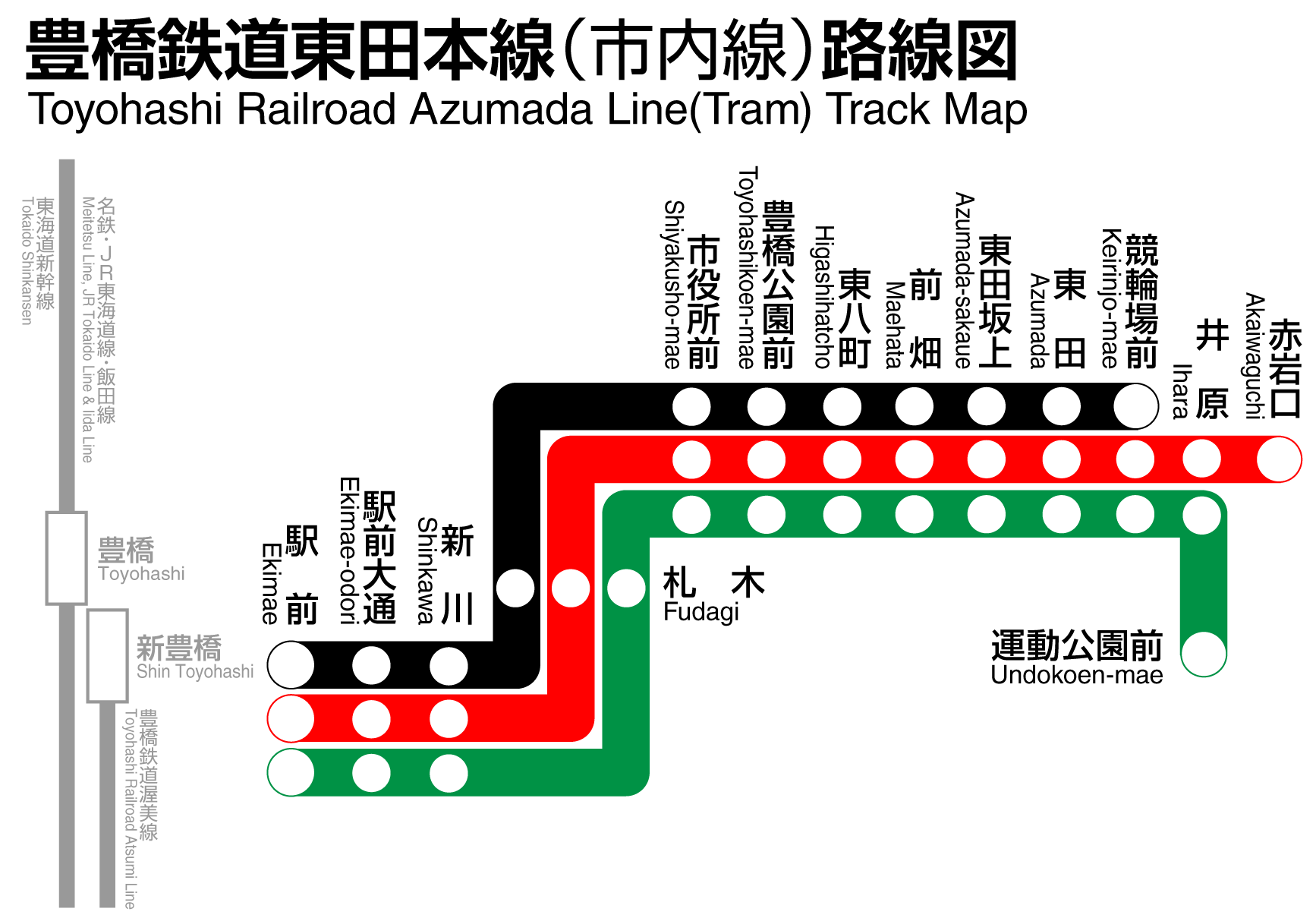

The Azumada Main Line (豊橋鉄道東田本線, Toyohashi Tetsudō Azumada-honsen) is a tram line in Toyohashi, Aichi Prefecture, Japan operated by Toyohashi Railroad. It connects Ekimae (situated in front of JR and Meitetsu's Toyohashi Station) to Akaiwaguchi and Undoukoen-mae. The line is also referred to as Toyotetsu City Line (豊鉄市内線, Toyotetsu Shinai-sen), or just City Line.

Until 1976, the company also operated another tram line, the Yagyu-bashi Branch Line.

== Overview ==
The entire line is a street-running tram line. It is often called the Shinai-sen or the Shiden (meaning "(inner-)city line" and "city tram" respectively).

Although some sections ceased operations during the 1970s much like many other tram lines in the era, a new branch line was opened in 1982, running between Ihara and Undokoen-mae. In 1998, the Ekimae stop was moved to its current location, extending the line by 150 m (492 ft). In 2005, a new station by the name of Ekimae-odori was created between Ekimae and Shinkawa.

Since 1989, most tramcars excluding type T1000 and Mo3000 have had full-body advertisements.

After the closure of the Meitetsu Gifu City Line (Gifu) and Minomachi Line (Gifu, Seki, Mino) on 1 April 2005, the Azumada Main Line has been the only tram line in Tōkai region.

=== Basic Data ===
- Line length: Ekimae – Akaiwaguchi 4.8 km (3.0 mi), Ihara – Undoukoen-mae 0.6 km (0.37 mi)
- Track gauge: 1067mm
- Stations: 14
- Double track: Ekimae - Keirinjo-mae
- Single track: Keirinjo-mae - Akaiwaguchi, Ihara - Undoukoen-mae
- Electrification: 600 V DC overhead line
- Signaling (single track sections): automatic block signaling

Between Fudaki and Higashi-haccho, the line runs on the National Route 1. Azumada Main Line being the only tram line that currently runs on the route.

The curve at Ihara where the line to Undoukoen-mae branches has a radius of 11 m (36 ft). This is the sharpest railway curve in Japan and is known as the Ihara Curve.

== Fares ==
As of 1 October 2019, Azumada Main Line has a flat rate fare system, with the adult fare being 180 yen and the child fare 90 yen. The proximity card manaca and other such cards compatible with it such as TOICA and Suica can be used to pay the fares. Fares are collected on the passenger's entry onto the tramcar. A transfer is required to go from Undokoen-mae to Akaiwaguchi and vice versa, but there is no discounted joint fare. A one-day pass is also available at 500 yen.

== Operations ==
During the daytime, trams operate every 7 minutes between Ekimae and Ihara, with the origin/destination alternating between Akaiwaguchi and Undoukoen-mae. During rush hour, additional trams are operated between Ekimae and Keirinjo-mae, shortening the minimum interval to five minutes. As the tram depot is situated in Akaiwaguchi, most late night services head to Akaiwaguchi. Additional trams are also operated during occasions such as festivals in the town and professional baseball matches at the stadium located close to Undokoen-mae stop.

=== Special Trams ===
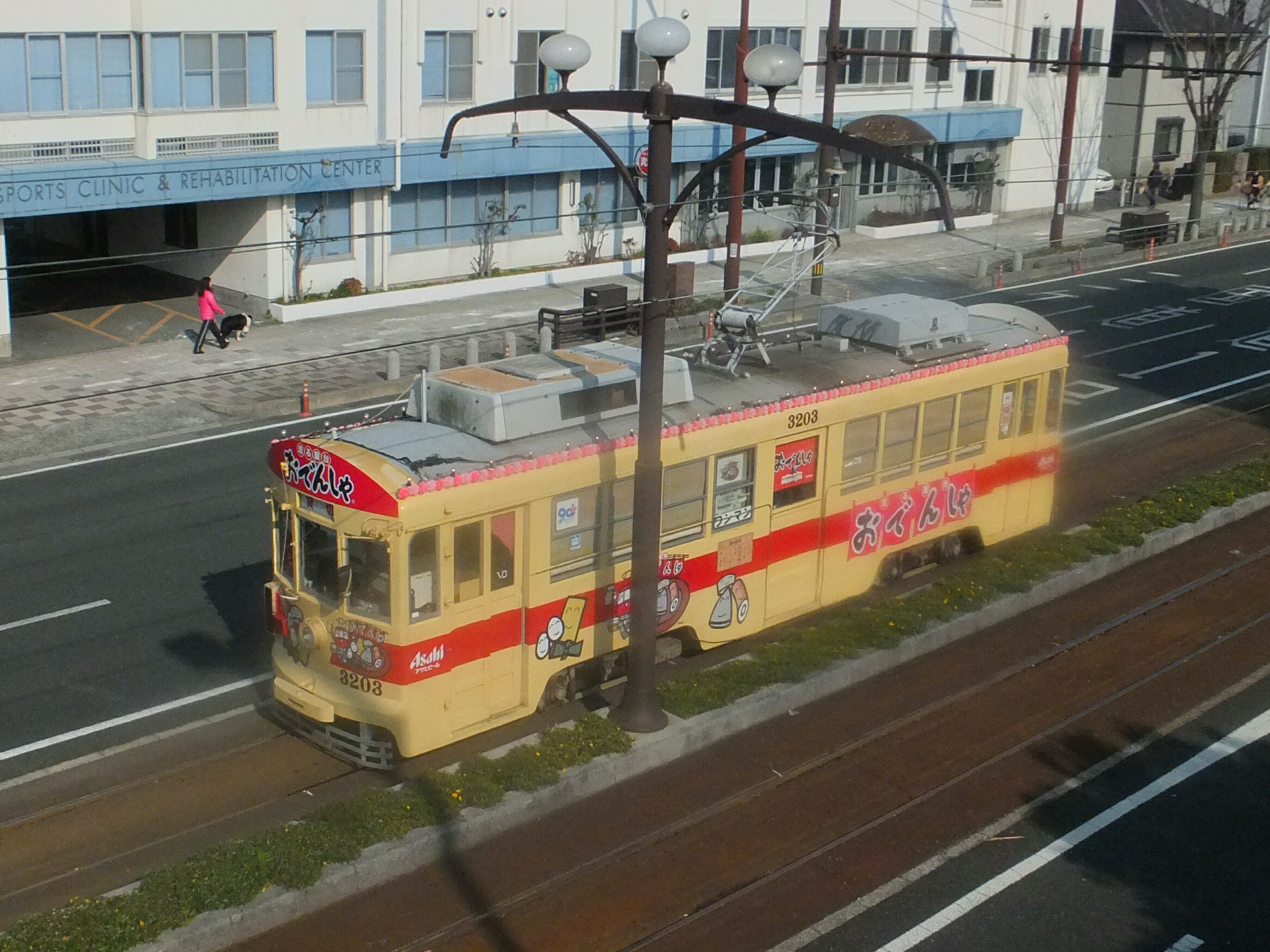
Odensha

On the Azumada Main Line, several special trams are operated every year. Mo3100 car 3102 (retired March 2018) had been used for these trams, but since 2010, Mo3200 car 3203 is used.

Below is a list of major special trams.

Beer Tram
Two return trips between Ekimae and Undokoen-mae are operated from June to August. Reservation is required.
Decorated Tramcar
A decorated tramcar (花電車) is operated for around one week before the Toyohashi Festival in October. Although most decorated tramcars in Japan do not allow passengers to board, the decorated tramcar on the Azumada Main Line is operated as a normal tram service.
Odensha
Odensha is a special tram service on which oden, a Japanese pot dish popular in the winter, is served. The name is a play-on-words that combines the dish name oden with densha, meaning "train" in Japanese. One return trip on weekdays and two return trips on weekends are operated from November to February between Ekimae and Undokoen-mae. The service started in 2007 as a winter version of the beer tram.
The name "Odensha" is a registered trademark of Toyohashi Railroad and in March 2015, "Odensha in Okayama" was operated on the Okayama Electric Tramway with Toyohashi Railroad's cooperation.

== Facilities ==
The line's depot is located at Akaiwaguchi. Before the extension to Akaiwaguchi in 1960, the depot was situated in Azumada. The site is now used as a pharmacy.

A siding that can park two tramcars exists in Keirinjo-mae, next to which the office for the line stands. During the daytime, drivers change at this stop and in the evening rush hour, the tramcars parked here are also used.

Crossovers between the east-bound and west-bound tracks exist on the west side of Shinkawa and on the east side of Azumada-sakaue. The crossover at Shinkawa is used once a year when the section between Ekimae and Shinkawa become a pedestrian zone at the Toyohashi Festival. The crossover at Azumada-sakue is regularly used for the tramcars from Ihara to enter the siding at Keirinjo-mae.

== History ==
- 1925
  - 14 July - Toyohashi Electric Railway opens Ekimae - Shinmei - Fudagi-jujiro (Main Line 0.8 km) and Shinmei - Yagyu-bashi (Branch Line 1.1 km).
  - 21 July - Main Line extended by 1.1 km to Akamon-mae.
  - 25 December - Main Line extended by 1.2 km to Azumada.
- 1945
  - 1 April - Introduction of flat rate fare system.
  - 20 June - Suspended due to the damage caused by Toyohashi Air Raid.
  - 20 September - Azumada Main Line resumes full operations.
- 1946
  - 13 February - Yagyu-bashi Branch Line resumes full operations.
- 1949
  - 1 September - Toyohashi Electric Railway renames itself Toyohashi Traffic.
  - 25 December - Shiyakusyo-mae - Akamon-mae is double-tracked.
- 1950
  - 7 April - Double-tracked new line opens from Azumada-sakue to Azumada via Shako-mae (later-day Kita-rinzaiji). The old single-track line via Honsha-mae is turned into a siding for the depot).
  - 15 July - New line opens Shinmei - Shiyakusyo-mae on Shin-ote-dori for downbound services (upbound services continue using the old line on the Ote-dori).
  - 26 August - New line opens Ekimae - Shinmei on Eki-o-dori for downbound services (upbound services continue using the old line on the Hirokoji-dori).
  - 17 September - Double-tracked extension opens Azumada - Keirinjo-mae.
  - 20 October - Ekimae - Shinmei upbound services move to double-tracked new line on Eki-o-dori.
- 1951
  - 30 July - Higashi-haccho - Maehata is double-tracked.
  - 30 October - Shinmei - Shiyakusyo-mae upbound services move to double-tracked new line on Shin-ote-dori.
- 1952
  - 19 March - Maehata - Azumada-sakaue is double-tracked.
  - 5 October - Single-track extension opens Ekimae - Shimibyoin-mae. Plans for a further extension to Nishi-haccho existed but was abandoned in 1963.
  - 25 December - Ekimae - Shimibyoin-mae is double-tracked.
- 1953
  - 17 October - Terminus for the Yagyu-bashi Branch Line is moved from Shinmei to Shinkawa (line shortened by 0.2 km).
- 1954
  - 22 July - Toyohashi Traffic renames itself Toyohashi Railroad.
- 1960
  - 1 June - Main Line extended by 1.2 km to Akaiwaguchi and a new depot opens at Akaiwaguchi. The old depot at Azumada is closed.
  - 8 December - One-man operation begins on the Yagyu-bashi Branch Line.
- 1969
  - 15 May - Ekimae - Shimincyoin-mae cease operations and Ekimae stop is moved by 0.2 km.
- 1971
  - 28 August - One-man operation begins on the Azumada Main Line.
- 1973
  - 31 March - Official closure of Ekimae - Shimincyoin-mae.
- 1976
  - 7 March - Yagyubashi Branch Line (0.9 km) is closed
- 1982
  - 31 July - Ihara - Undokoen-mae opens. This is the first tram extension in Japan in 14 years (previous extension was the 1968 Nagasaki Electric Tramway's Shian-bashi - Shokakuji-sita extension).
- 1998
  - 19 February - Ekimae stop is moved by 150 m to a location under the station pedway.

== Stops ==
- All stops are located within the City of Toyohashi.
- Names, transfers, and distances for defunct stations and sections are that of the day of the closure.
- Each stop is given a stop number from 1 to 14.

=== Current Sections ===
Azumada Main Line (Ekimae - Akaiwaguchi)
Stop Number	Stop Name		Distance from previous stop (km)	Distance from Ekimae (km)	Transfers
1	Ekimae	駅前	-	0.0	JR Central (Toyohashi Station) Tokaido Shinkansen, Tokaido Main Line, Iida Line Meitetsu (Toyohashi Station) ■ Nagoya Main Line Toyohashi Railroad (Shin-Toyohashi Station) ■ Atsumi Line
2	Ekimae-odori	駅前大通	0.3	0.3	
3	Shinkawa	新川	0.3	0.6	
4	Fudagi	札木	0.4	1.0	
5	Shiyakusho-mae	市役所前	0.4	1.4	
6	Toyohashikoen-mae	豊橋公園	0.2	1.6	
7	Higashi-hatcho	東八町	0.5	2.1	
8	Maehata	前畑	0.4	2.5	
9	Azumada-sakaue	東田坂上	0.3	2.8	
10	Azumada	東田	0.5	3.3	
11	Keirinjo-mae	競輪場前	0.3	3.6	
12	Ihara	井原	0.5	4.1	Azumada Main Line (for Undokoen-mae)
13	Akaiwaguchi	赤岩口	0.7	4.8	

Azumada Main Line (Ihara - Undokoen-mae)
Stop Number	Stop Name		Distance from previous stop (km)	Distance from (km)		Transfers
Stop Number	Stop Name		Distance from previous stop (km)	Ekimae	Ihara	Transfers
12	Ihara	井原	-	4.1	0.0	Azumada Main Line (for Akaiwaguchi)
14	Undokoen-mae	運動公園前	0.6	4.7	0.6	

=== Defunct Sections ===
Azumada Main Line
Stop Name	Distance from previous stop (km)	Distance from Shiminbyoin-mae (km)	Transfers
Shiminbyoin-mae	-	0.0	
Shirokaizu	0.1	0.1	
Ekimae	0.3*	0.4*	JNR (Toyohashi Station) Tokaido Shinkansen, Tokaido Main Line, Iida Line Meitetsu (Toyohashi Station) Nagoya Main Line Toyohashi Railroad (Shin-Toyohashi Station) Atsumi Line

- Section closed in 1969 (official closure 1973). As Ekimae was moved at the time of closure by 0.2 km, the length of the abolished section is actually 0.6 km rather than 0.4 km. In 1998, Ekimae was moved back to its original position.

Yagyu-bashi Branch Line
Stop Name	Distance from previous stop (km)	Distance from Shinkawa (km)	Transfers
Shinkawa	-	0.0	Azumada Main Line
Nakashiba	0.4	0.4	
Matsuyama	0.2	0.6	
Yagyu-bashi	0.3	0.9	Toyohashi Railroad Atsumi Line

- Section closed in 1976.

== Vehicles ==
=== Current ===
Most cars now have full body advertising or special liveries.

Mo3200
Ex-Meitetsu Mo580 used on the Gifu City Line and the Minomachi Line. Three cars were transferred to Toyotetsu in 1976 and 1981. Car Mo3201 ceased operations on 19 September 2019 and car Mo3202 on 11 February 2020. Car Mo3203 has been designated for special trams since 2009 (it is used on normal services as well when not serving as a special tram).
Mo3500
Ex-Toden Arakawa Line (Tokyo) Type 7000. Four cars were transferred in 1992 and 1999.
Mo780
Ex-Meitetsu Mo780 used on the Gifu City Line and Ibi Line (a "railway" line that was operated together with Gifu City line in its final years). All seven cars of the type were transferred after the lines' closure on 1 April 2005.
Mo800
Ex-Meitetsu Mo800 used on the Minomachi Line. There were three cars of the type, of which one (car Mo801) was transferred to Toyotetsu and the other two (cars Mo802 & Mo803) to Fukui Railway in Fukui Prefecture. The type is the first low-floor tramcar on the line, although the end sections are high floored. It was initially unable to enter the Undokoen-mae branch due to the sharp curve, but was modified in 2018 to enable it. On 26 December 2018, it was announced that Toyotetsu will buy the two cars belonging to Fukui Railway. The two cars were carried out of Fukui Railway's depot on 13 March 2019, and after undergoing modifications, car Mo802 started operations on 16 October 2019.
T1000
A full low-floor tramcar introduced as part of the Toyohashi Tramway Revitalization Project. Manufactured by Alna Sharyo as part of its Little Dancer series (type Ua), it is an articulated tramset consisting of three cars and two bogies (the middle car has no bogie and floats). It is the second new tramcar type that are not transfers from other tramways for the company in 83 years (the first being Type 1 made on the opening of the line). It was given the nickname Hottoram (from "Hotto" (relief) and "tram") and started operations on 19 December 2008. It is unable to enter the Undokoen-mae branch due to the sharp curve.

=== Former ===
==== Two-axle Cars ====
MoHa100
Made for the line opening in 1925 as Type 1. Ten cars were made in total and all cars ceased operations by 1957.
MoHa200
Ex-Asahikawa Town Tram (Asahikawa, Hokkaido) cars introduced in 1949. All cars ceased operations by 1965.
MoHa300
Ex-Nagoya City Tram cars with a stepped roof design and open-air decks introduced in 1950. All cars ceased operations by 1963.
MoHa400
Ex-Nagoya City Tram cars (originally from Kuwana Electric Tramway and Shimonoishiki Electric Tramway) introduced in 1951. All cars ceased operations by 1963.
MoHa500
Ex-Nagoya City Tram cars introduced in 1957. All cars ceased operations by 1968, marking the end of two-axle cars for the company.

==== Bogie Cars ====
Mo3600
Ex-Mie Kotsu Shinto Line Mo541 introduced in 1961 as the line's first bogie car. All cars ceased operations in 1971.
Mo3700
Ex-Nagoya City Tram Type BLA introduced in 1963. Of the four cars introduced, three were withdrawn in the 1970s, with one operating as a "Retro Tram" until 2007. It has been on display at the City of Toyohashi's Development Center for Children's Futures since 2008.
Mo3800
Ex-Nagoya City Tram Type 900 introduced in 1963. Originally called Type 800, it was renamed in 1968. All cars ceased operations by 1989.
Mo3900
Ex-Nagoya City Tram Type 1150 introduced in 1964. All cars ceased operations by 1971.
Mo3300
Ex-Hokuriku Railroad Kanazawa City Line (defunct) MoHa2300 introduced in 1967. Originally called Type 300, it was renamed in 1968. All cars ceased operations by 2000.
Mo3100
Ex-Nagoya City Tram Type 1400 introduced in 1964. All but one car ceased operations by 2006, after which car 3102 was used for special trams until 2011.

=== Car Quantity ===
Year(s)	Mo3100	Mo3200	Mo3300	Mo3700	Mo3800	Mo3500	Mo780	Mo800	T1000	Total
1982 - 1988	9	3	2	1	1					16
1989	9	3	2	1						15
1990	8	3	2	1						14
1991	8	3	2	1						14(2)
1992	8	3	2	1						14(4)
1993	7	3	2	1		2				15(6)
1994	7	3	2	1		2				15(8)
1995	7	3	2	1		2				15(10)
1996 - 1999	7	3	2	1		2				15(12)
2000 - 2005	7	3		1		4				15(14)
2006	1	3		1		4	7	1		17(16)
2007 - 2008	1	3				4	7	1		16(16)
2009 - 2011	1	3				4	7	1	1	17(17)
2012 - 2018		3				4	7	1	1	16(16)
2019		3				4	7	2	1	17(17)

- The number in brackets in the "total" section is the number of air-conditioned cars.
- Quantities are as of 1 January for 1982 and 1983 and as of 1 April for 1984 and later.

== Streets that the line runs on ==
- Ohashi-dori
- Ekimae-o-dori
- Azalia-dori
- Oike-dori
- Tahara-kaido (National Route 259)
- Fudagi-dori
- Kamagori-kaido
- Haccho-dori (National Route 1)
- Tame-kaido
- Shiden-dori
- Undokoen-dori

== Gallery ==
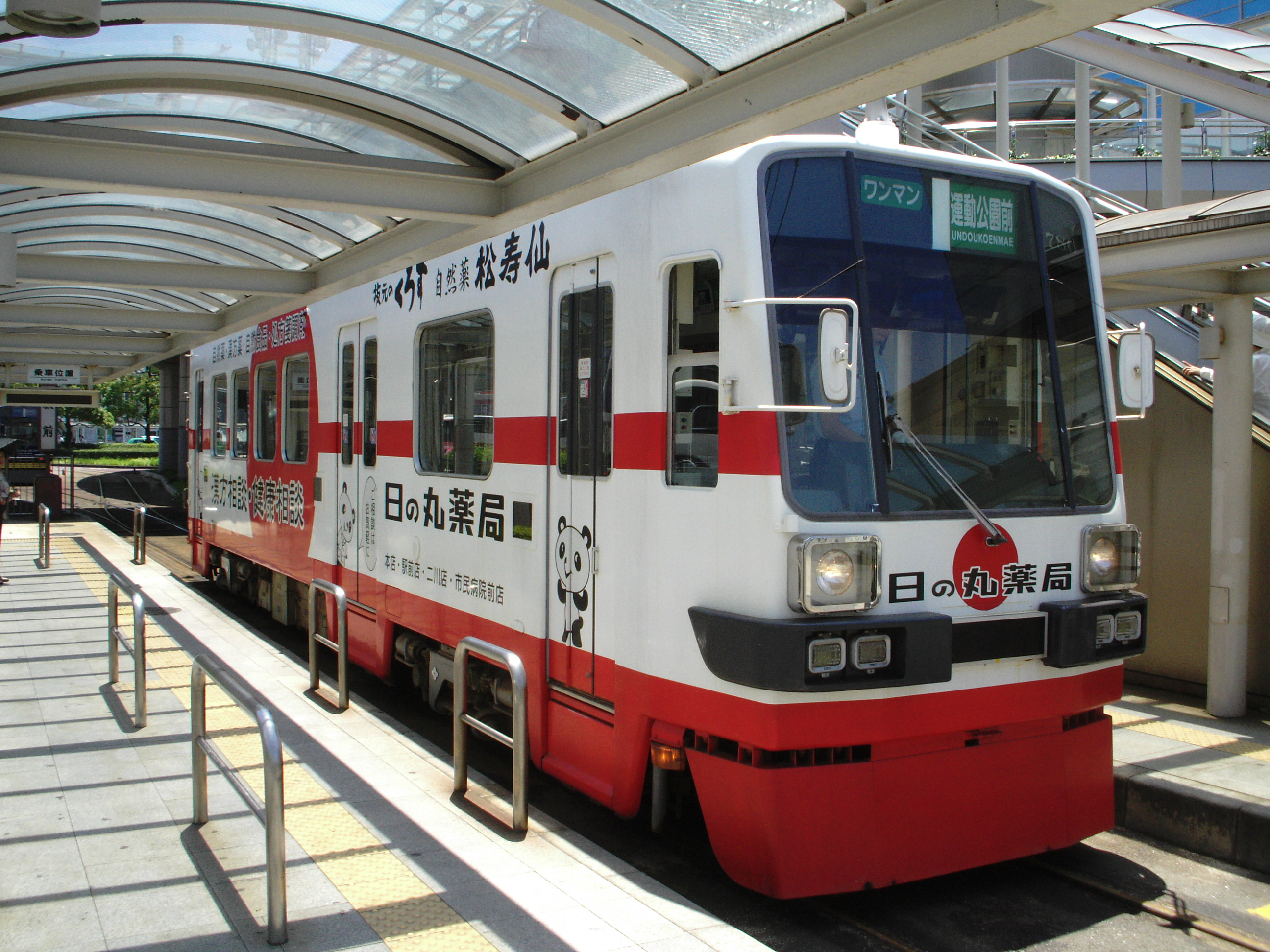
Mo780

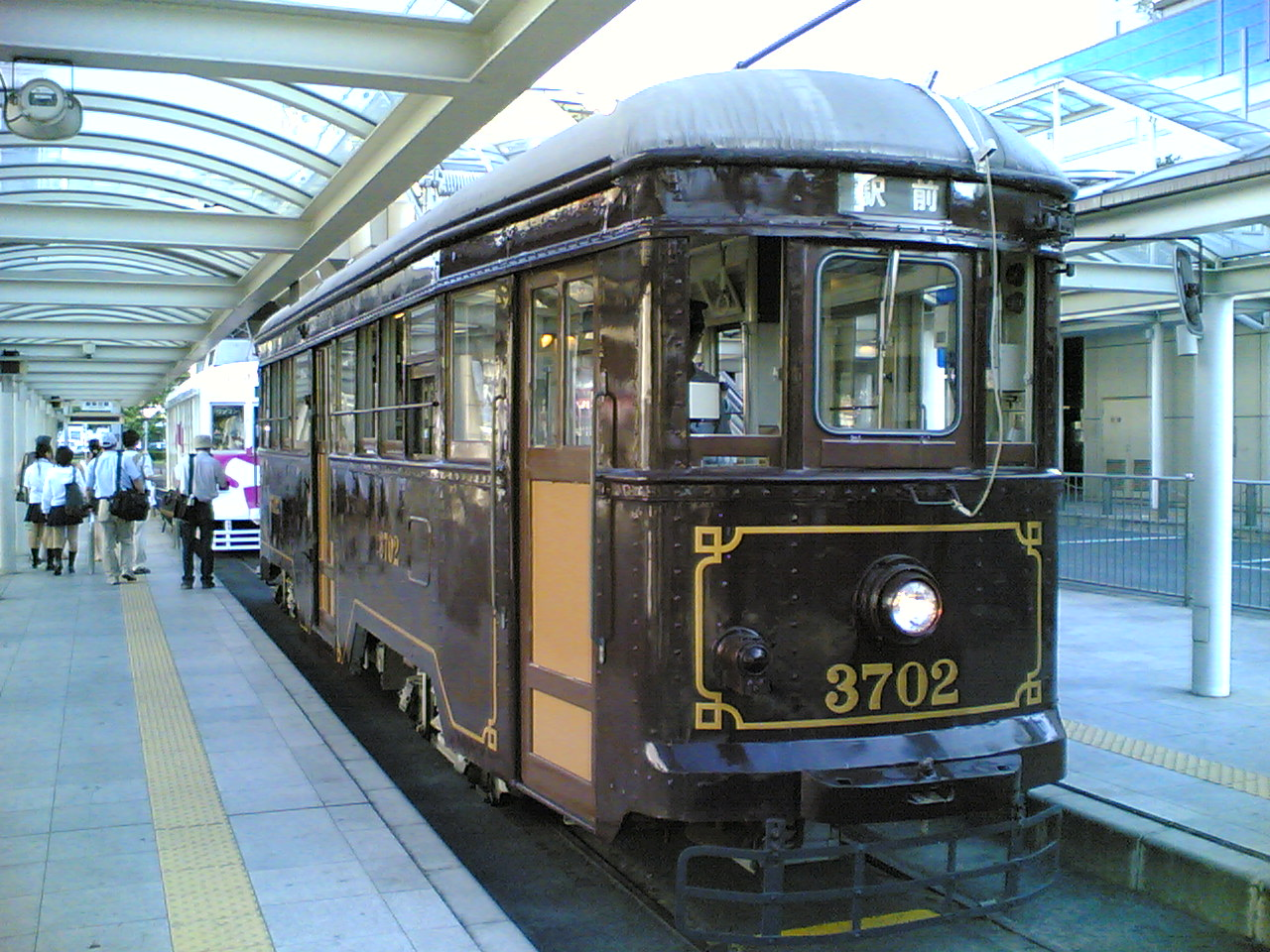
Mo3700
