= Toyohashi Railroad =

Railroad company in Japan

Toyohashi Rail Road Company Ltd 豊橋鉄道株式会社
- Company type: subsidiary
- Industry: Transportation
- Founded: March 17, 1924; 102 years ago
- Headquarters: Toyohashi, Aichi, Japan
- Area served: eastern Aichi Prefecture, Japan
- Revenue: 5.6 billion Yen (2005)
- Total equity: 225 million Yen
- Parent: Meitetsu Group
- Website: http://www.toyotetsu.com/

The Toyohashi Railroad (豊橋鉄道, Toyohashi Tetsudō) is a private railroad company in Japan, and a subsidiary of the Meitetsu Group. The company or its lines are commonly known as Toyotetsu (豊鉄). The company operates the Atsumi Line train service on Atsumi Peninsula in Aichi Prefecture and a tram system in Toyohashi City, and has subsidiary operations involved in taxi and bus services.

== Company history ==
The Toyohashi Railway was incorporated on March 17, 1924, as the Toyohashi Electric Railway Company (豊橋電気軌道株式会社, Toyohashi Denki Kidō K.K.), with its tram operations beginning on July 14, 1925. The company expanded into bus services from 1935. From September 1939, the company came under the umbrella of the Nagoya Railway (the forerunner to modern Meitetsu). The company established a subsidiary for taxicab operations on September 1, 1949. The company name was officially changed to its current name on July 22, 1954. On October 1, 1954, Meitetsu turned over operations and assets from its Atsumi Line to the new Toyohashi Railway Corporation.

On October 1, 1956, the Toyohashi Railway acquired the local Taguchi Railway Company, which continued to operate as the Toyohashi Railway Taguchi Line until September 1, 1968. In October, 1988 the company opened a hotel at Toyohashi Station.

From February 2011, the Manaca Smart Card system was implemented on the Toyohashi Railway network.

== Railway Lines ==
- Heavy rail
  - Atsumi Line: Shin-Toyohashi–Mikawa-Tahara
- Tramway
  - Azumada Main Line: Ekimae–Akaiwaguchi, Ihara–Undō-Kōen-mae

== Bus Lines ==
Toyotetsu Bus operates local lines in and around Toyohashi, as well as the highway bus linking the city and Chūbu Centrair International Airport, the night bus linking the city and Tokyo.

== See also ==
- List of railway companies in Japan
- List of light-rail transit systems
