= Cape Irago =

Cape in southern Aichi Prefecture, Japan

Cape Irago 伊良湖岬 (Irago-misaki)
- Cape
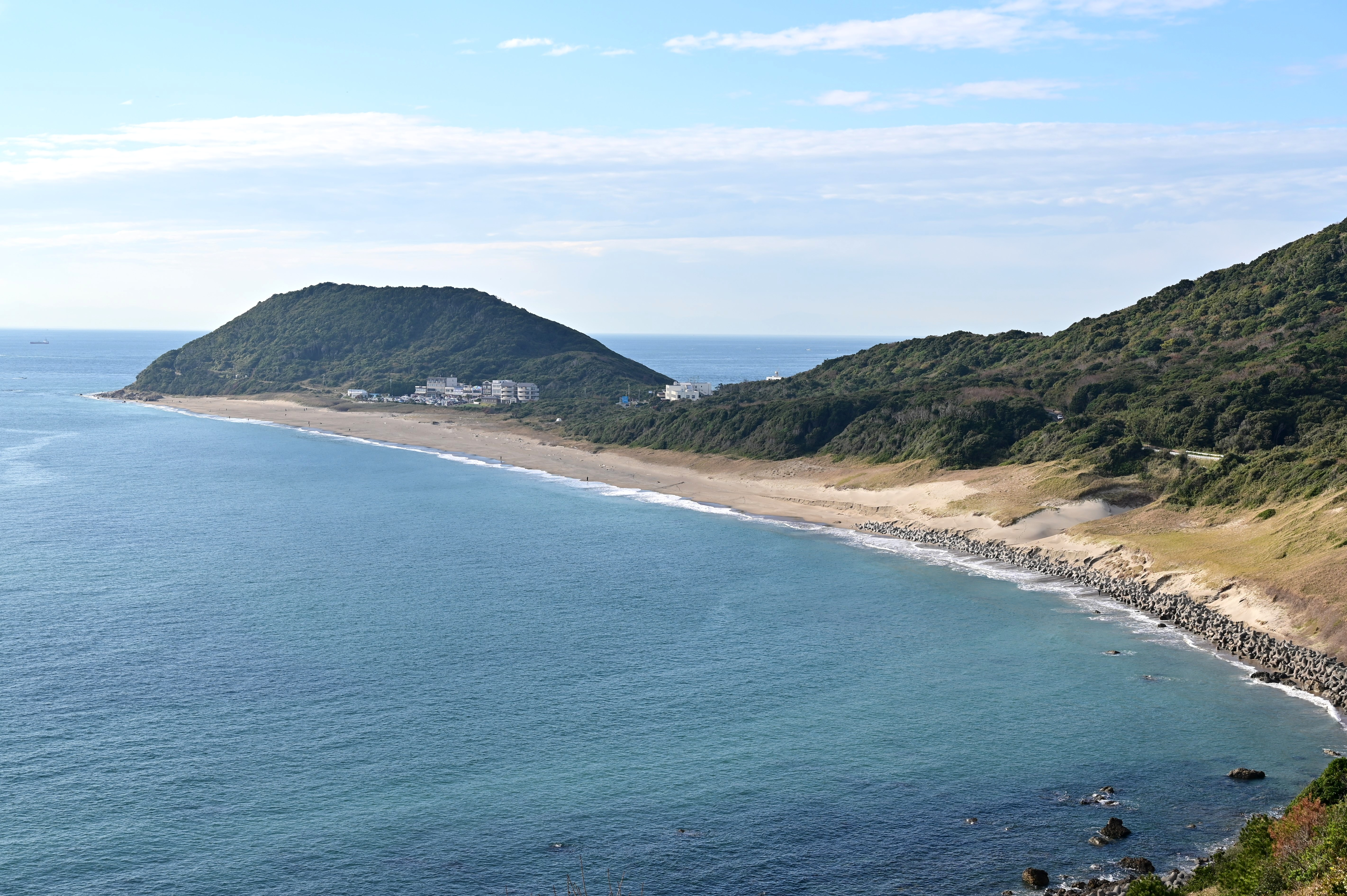
- View of Cape Irago

- Coordinates: 34°34′46″N 137°00′58″E
- Location: Tahara, Aichi, Japan
- Offshore water bodies: Pacific Ocean

Cape Irago (伊良湖岬, Irago-misaki?) is the terminal point of land at the west end of Atsumi Peninsula in southern Aichi Prefecture, Japan. The cape forms one side of the entrances to Ise Bay and Mikawa Bay, which are divided by the Chita Peninsula. Because it is a crucial landmark for ships Irago Lighthouse is located in the cape to help guide and warn passing ships.

Gallery
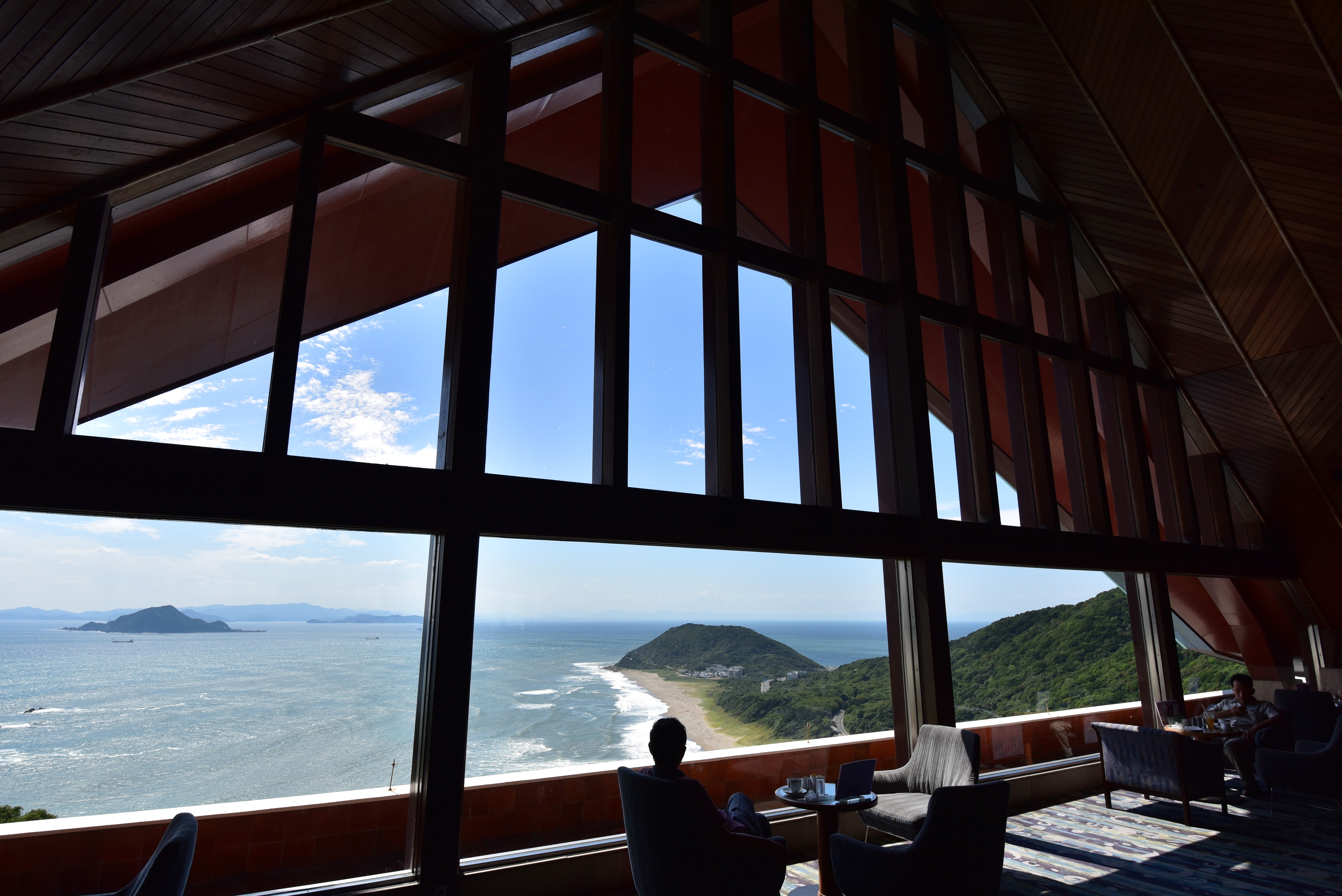
View of Cape Irago from Irago Ocean Resort

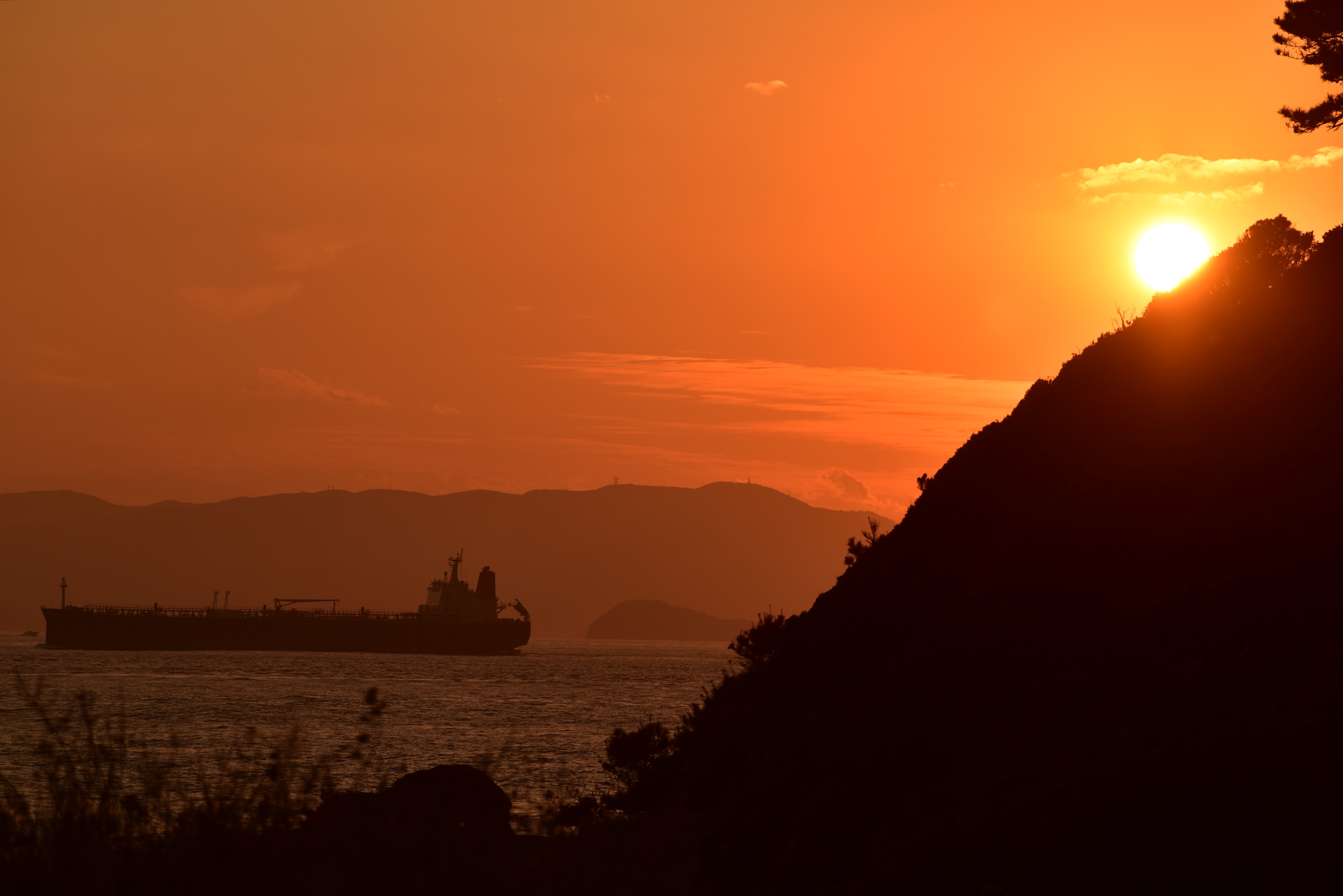
Evening view of Cape Irago
