= Shin-Toyohashi Station =

Railway station in Toyohashi, Aichi Prefecture, Japan

Shin-Toyohashi Station 新豊橋駅
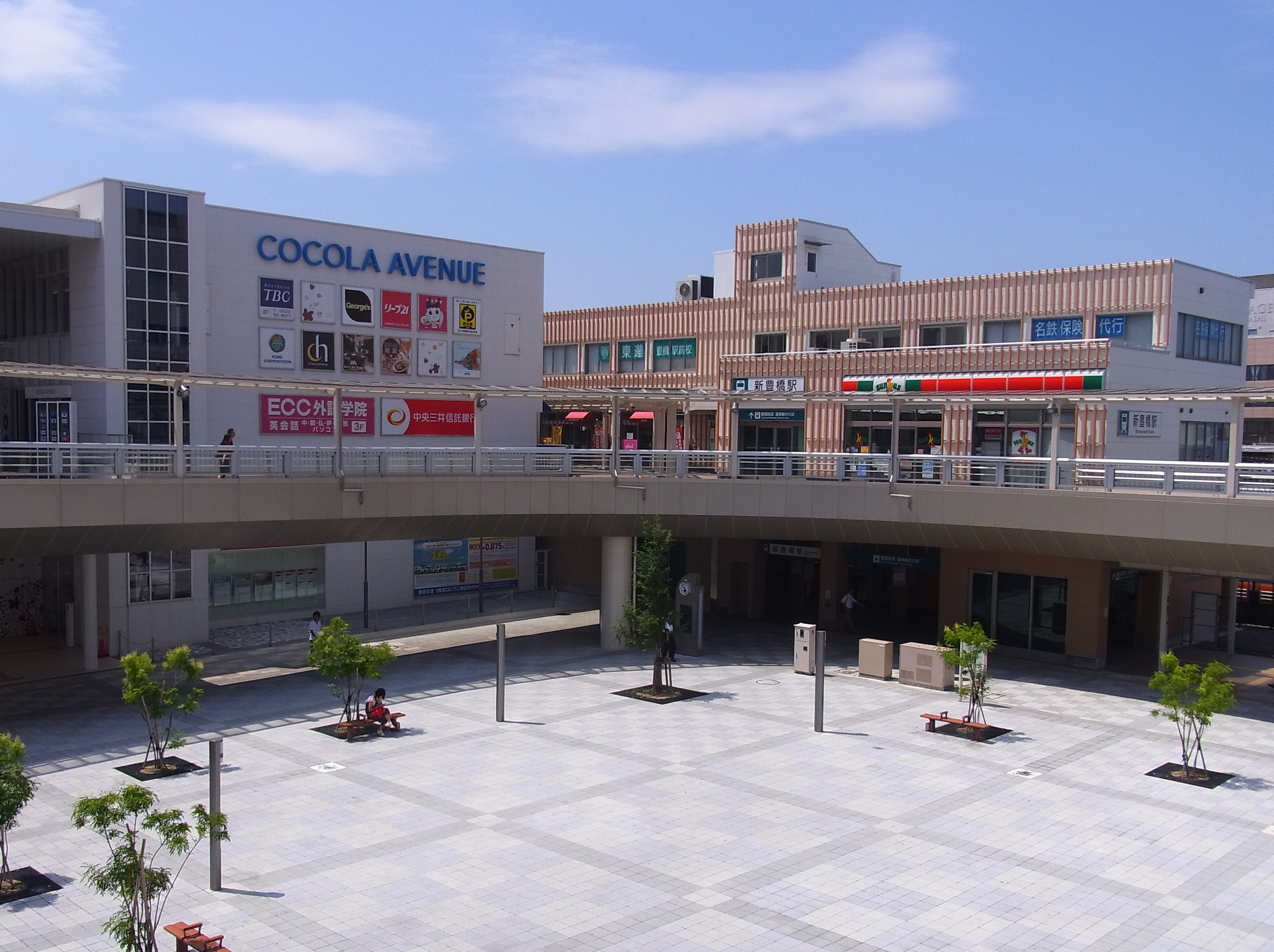
- Shin-Toyohashi Station

General information
- Location: Nishijuku Hanada-cho, Toyohashi-shi, Aichi-ken 440-0075; Japan
- Coordinates: 34°45′44″N 137°22′58.6″E
- Operator: Toyohashi Railroad
- Line: ■ Atsumi Line
- Distance: 18.0 kilometers from Mikawa-Tahara
- Platforms: 1 island platform

Other information
- Status: Staffed
- Station code: 01

History
- Opened: October 1, 1927

Passengers
- FY2017: 18,228 daily
Location
- Location within Aichi Prefecture Location within Japan

Shin-Toyohashi Station (新豊橋駅, Shin-Toyohashi-eki) is a railway station in the city of Toyohashi, Aichi Prefecture, Japan, operated by the Public–private partnership Toyohashi Railroad. The station is physically adjacent to Toyohashi Station.

== Lines ==
Shin-Toyohashi Station is a terminal station of the Atsumi Line, and is located 18.0 kilometers from the opposing terminus of the line at Mikawa-Tahara Station.

== Station layout ==
The station has a single dead-headed island platform. The station is staffed.

== Adjacent stations ==
«	Service	»
Toyohashi Railroad
Toyohashi Railroad Atsumi Line
Terminus	-	Yagyu-bashi

== Station history ==
Shin-Toyohashi Station was established by the privately held Atsumi Railroad on October 1, 1927. Previously, the terminal of the Atsumi Railroad was 200 meters further north at Hanada Station (花田駅, Hanada Station). On September 1, 1940, the Atsumi Railway became part of the Nagoya Railway system, and was spun out again as the Toyohashi Railway on October 1, 1954. In 2008, the station was expanded, with its side platform changed to an island platform, and the station building replaced by an elevated three-story station building.

== Passenger statistics ==
In fiscal 2017, the station was used by an average of 18,228 passengers daily.

== Surrounding area ==
- downtown Toyohashi city

== See also ==
- List of railway stations in Japan
