= Mikawa Tahara Station =

Railway station in Tahara, Aichi Prefecture, Japan

Mikawa Tahara Station 三河田原駅
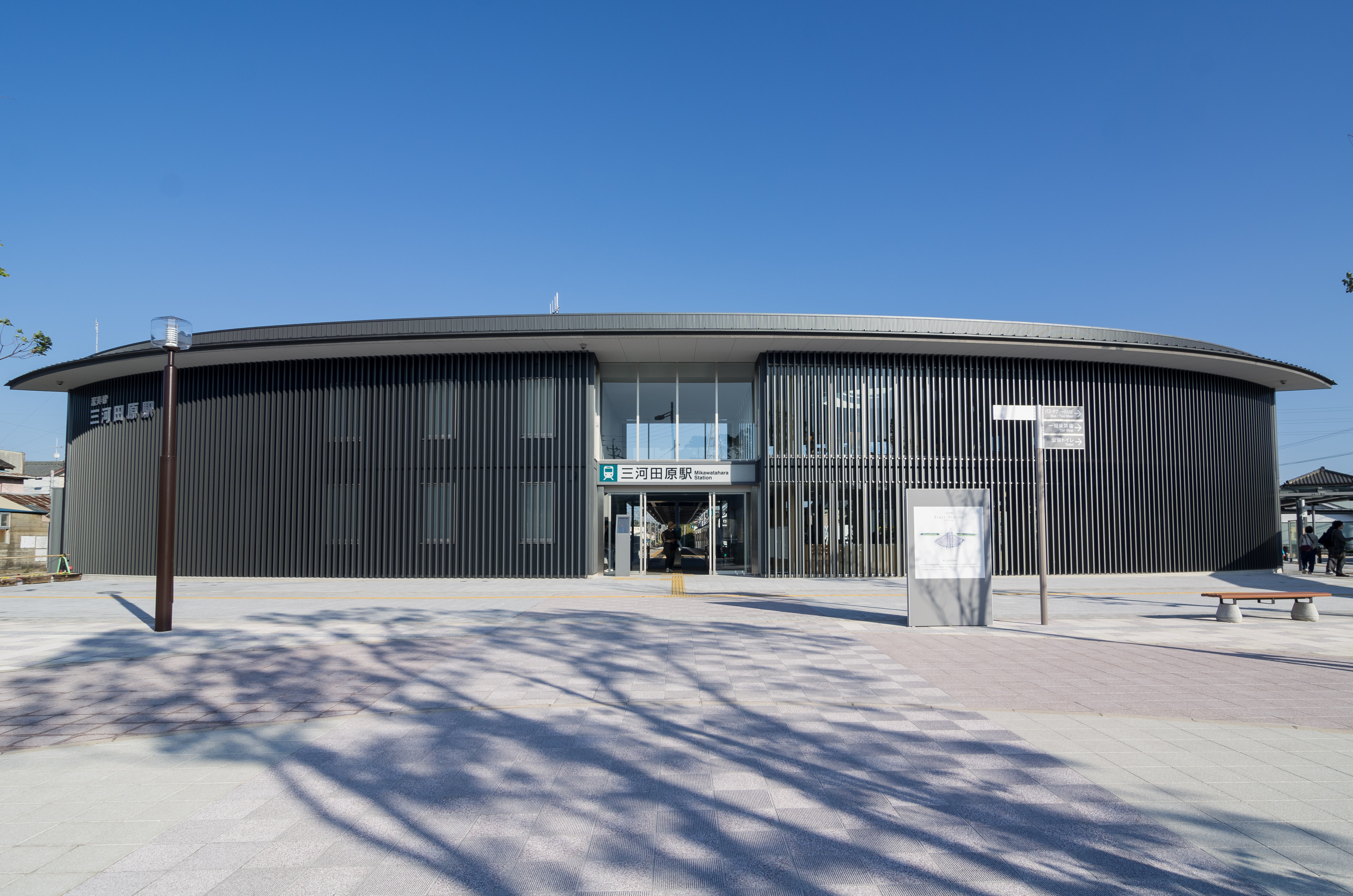
- Mikawa Tahara Station in January 2013

General information
- Location: Higashiohama Tahara-cho, Tahara-shi, Aichi-ken 441-3421; Japan
- Coordinates: 34°40′0.80″N 137°16′9″E
- Operator: Toyohashi Railroad
- Line: ■ Atsumi Line
- Distance: 18.0 kilometers from Shin-Toyohashi
- Platforms: 2 bay platforms

Other information
- Status: Staffed
- Station code: 16

History
- Opened: June 10, 1924
- Former names: Tahara (to 1927)

Passengers
- FY2016: 1480 daily
Location
- Location within Aichi Prefecture Location within Japan

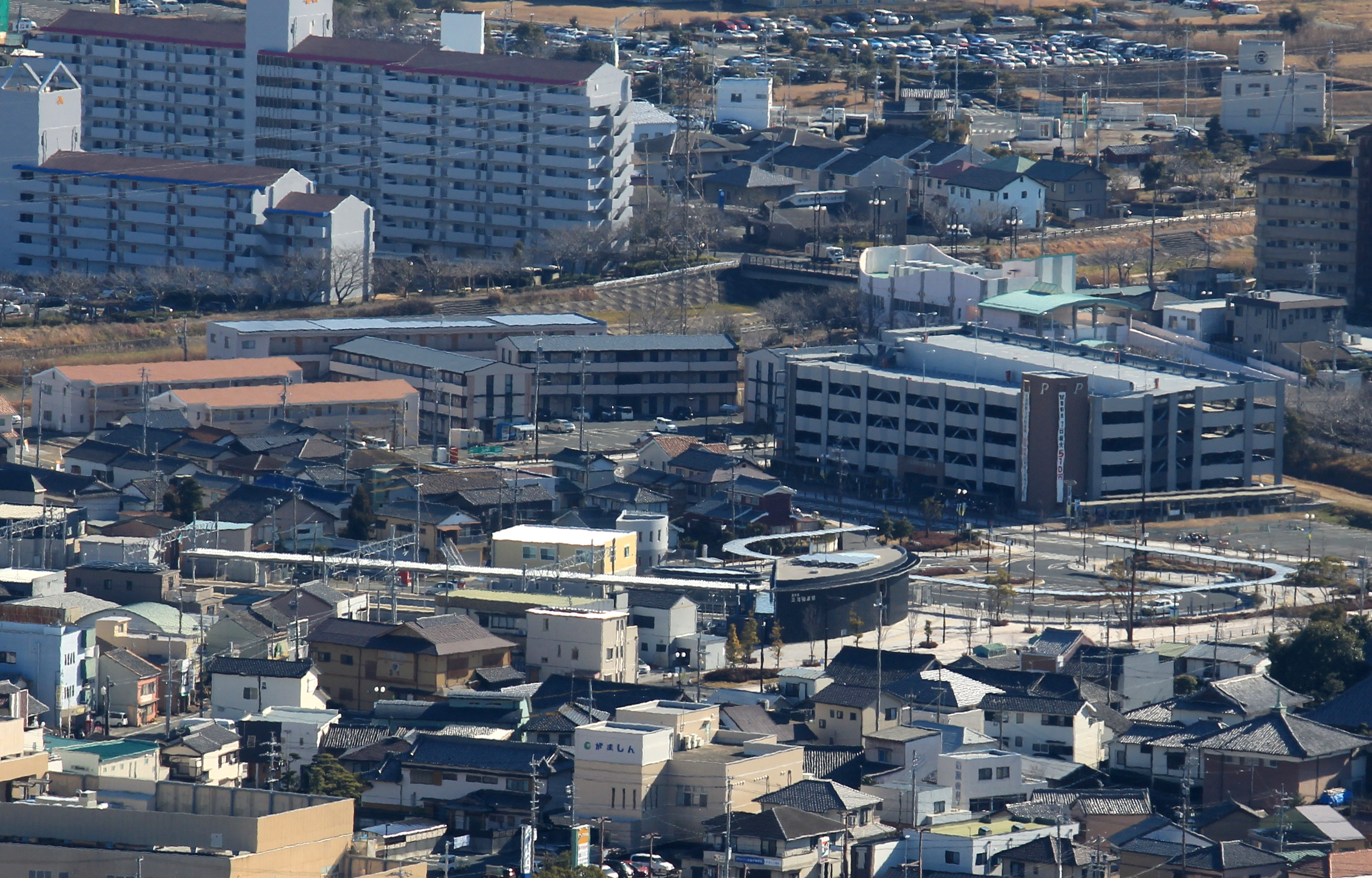
Aerial view

Mikawa Tahara Station (三河田原駅, Mikawa-Tahara-eki) is a railway station in the city of Tahara, Aichi Prefecture, Japan, operated by the Public–private partnership Toyohashi Railroad.

== Lines ==
Mikawa Tahara Station is a terminal station of the Atsumi Line, and is located 18.0 kilometers from the opposing terminus of the line at Shin-Toyohashi Station.

== Station layout ==
The station has two bay platforms, with an adjacent station building. The station building is staffed.

=== Platforms ===
1, 2	■ Toyohashi Railroad Atsumi Line	for Shin-Toyohashi
3, 4	■ Toyohashi Railroad Atsumi Line	for Shin-Toyohashi

== Adjacent stations ==
«	Service	»
Toyohashi Railroad
Toyohashi Railroad Atsumi Line
Kambe	-	Terminus

== Station history ==
Mikawa Tahara Station was established on June 10, 1924 as Tahara Station (田原駅, Tahara-eki) on the privately held Atsumi Railroad. The station name was changed to its present name in 1927. On April 10, 1926, the line was extended to Kurokawahara. The Atsumi Railroad was merged into the Nagoya Railroad on September 1, 1940. The section from Mikawa Tahara to Kurokawahara was discontinued on June 5, 1944. The Toyohashi Railroad Company was established on October 1, 1954. In October 1994, a new station building was completed. A modern station building was completed on October 27, 2013.

== Passenger statistics ==
In fiscal 2016, the station was used by an average of 1,480 passengers daily.

== Surrounding area ==
- Tahara Castle
- Tahara City Hall

== See also ==
- List of railway stations in Japan
