= Atsumi Peninsula =

Peninsula in southern Aichi Prefecture, Japan

Coordinates: 34°40′N 137°16′E

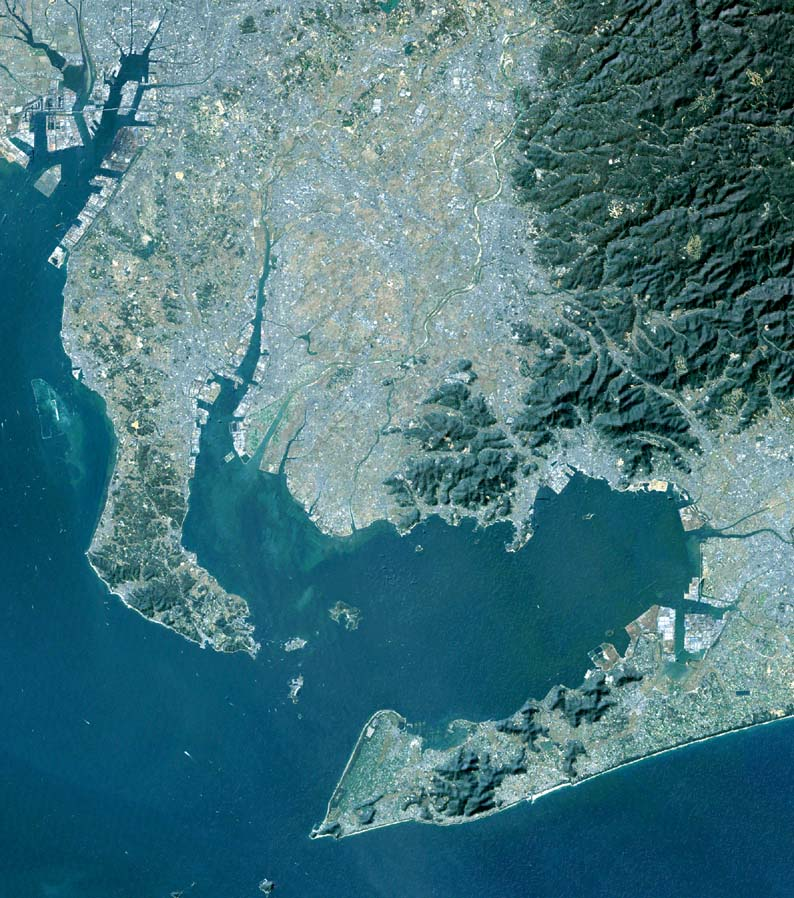
Satellite image of Chita Peninsula (left), Mikawa Bay (center), and Atsumi Peninsula (lower right)

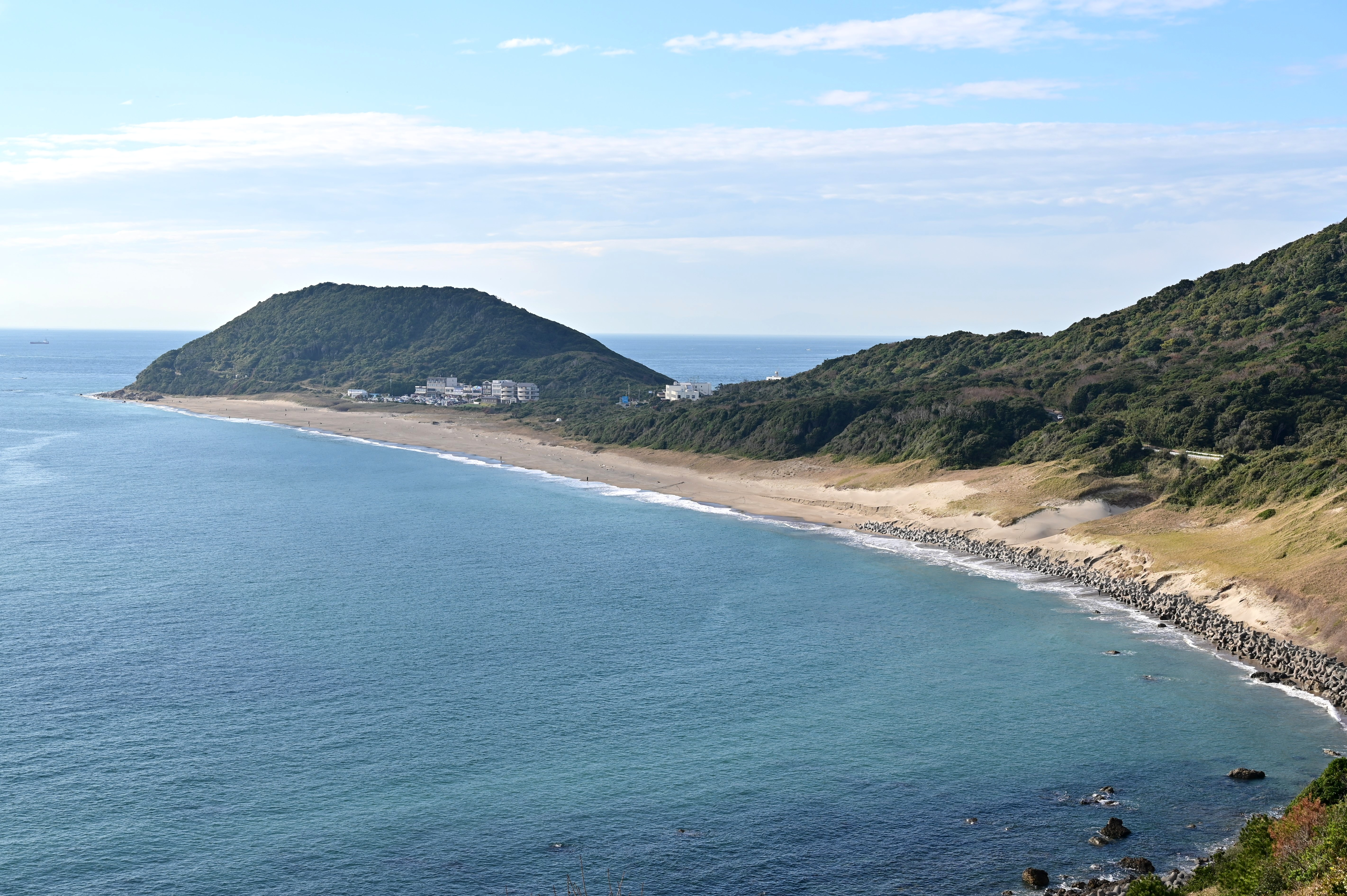
Cape Irago

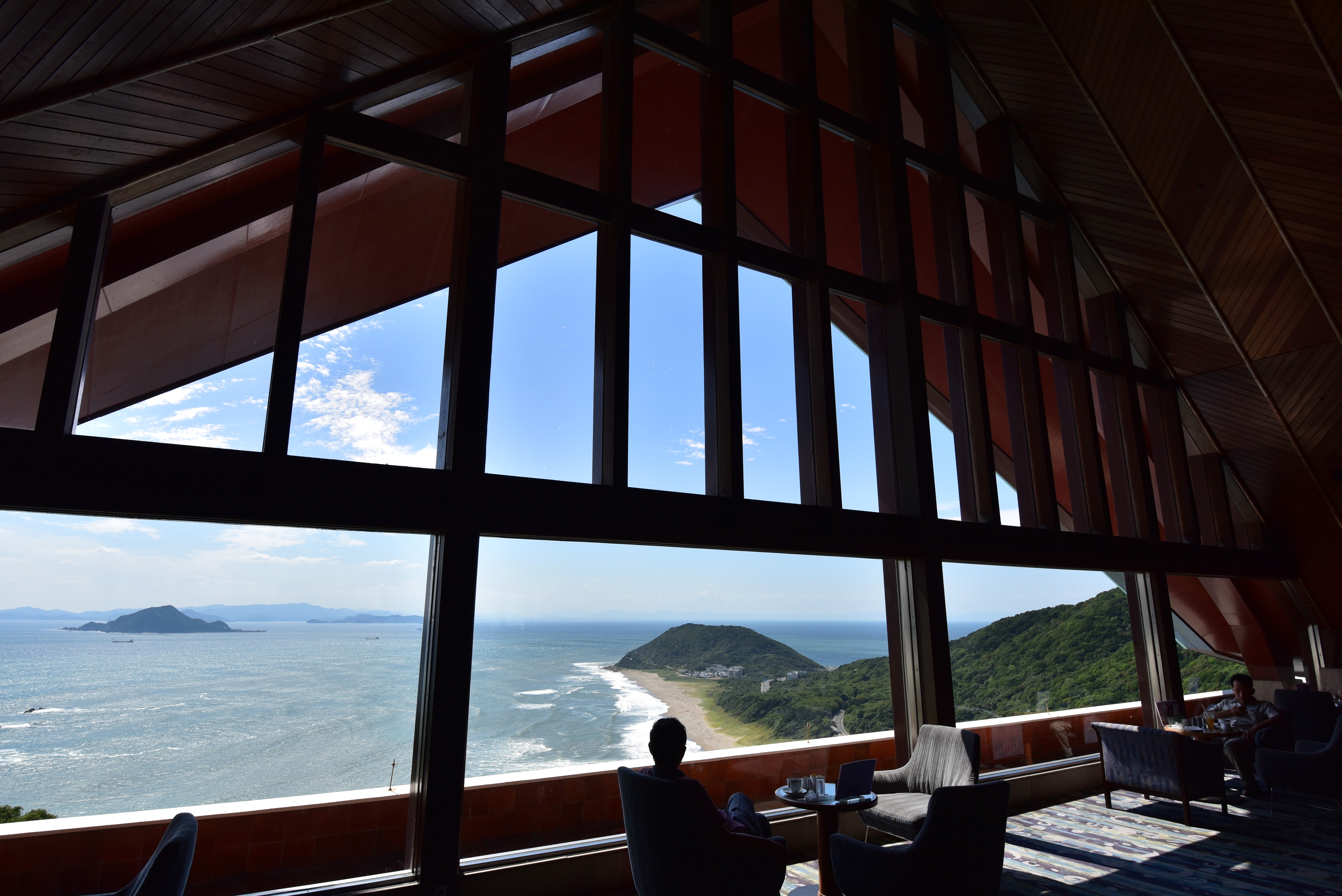
View of Cape Irago from Irako View Hotel

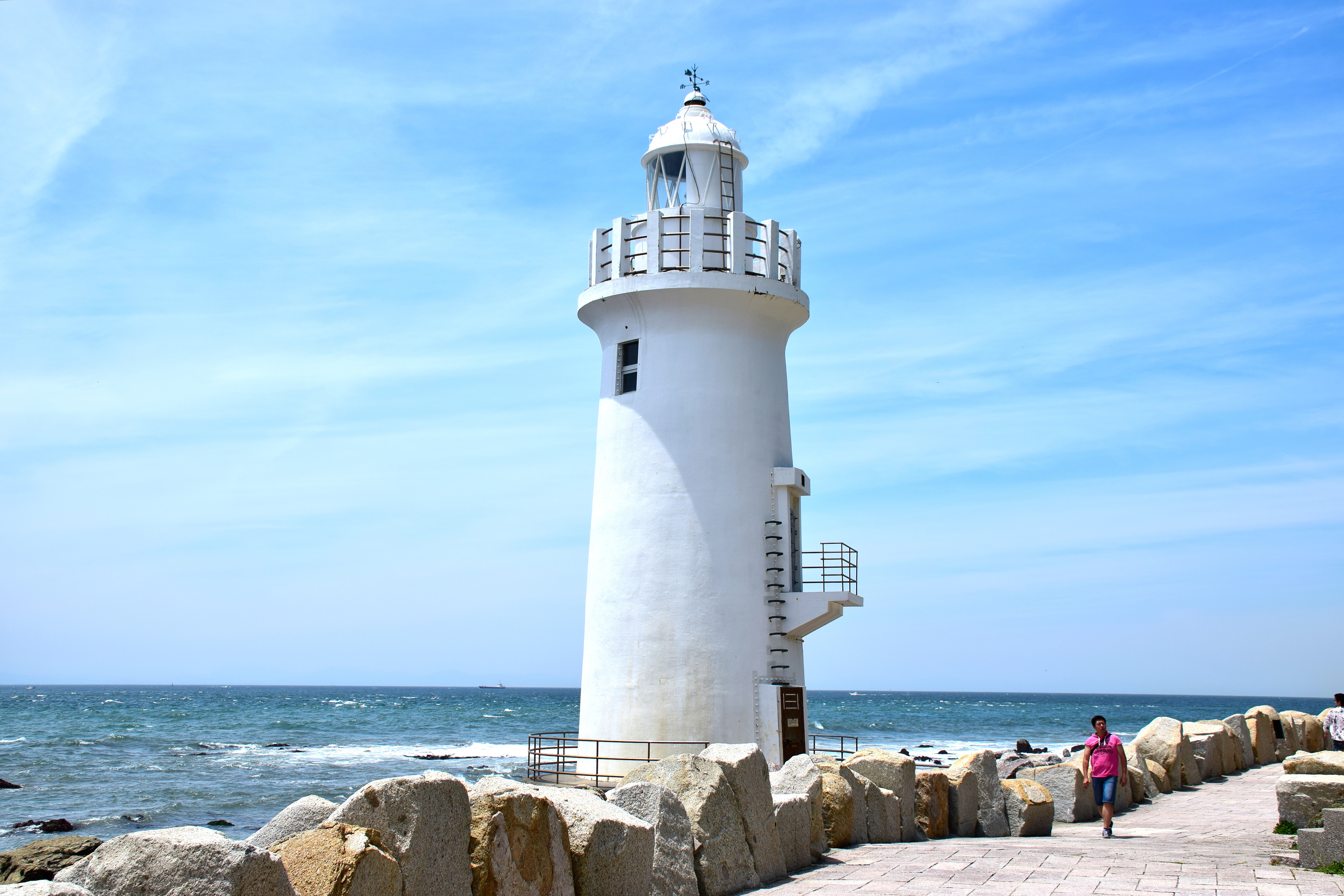
Cape Irago Lighthouse

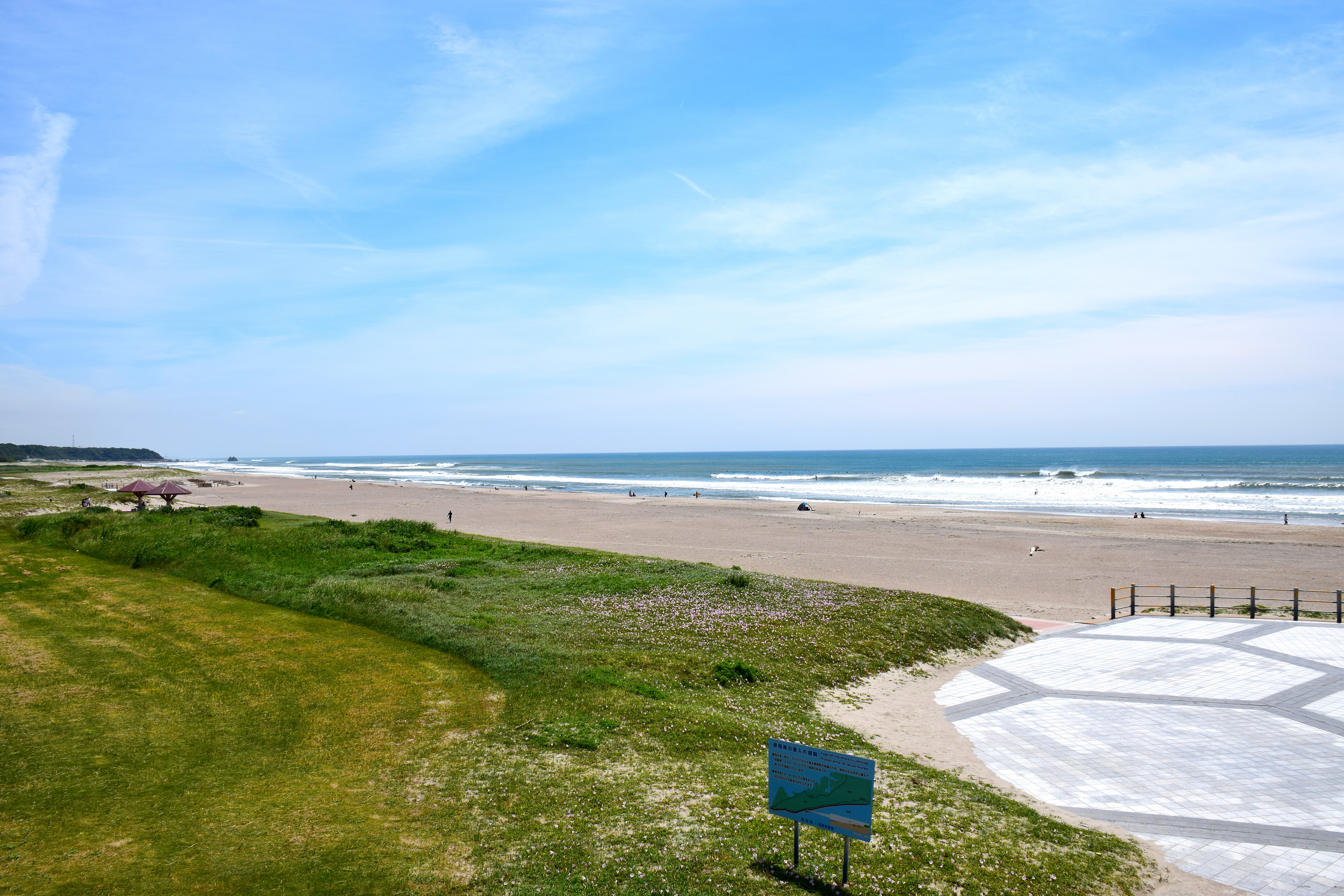
Akabane Beach

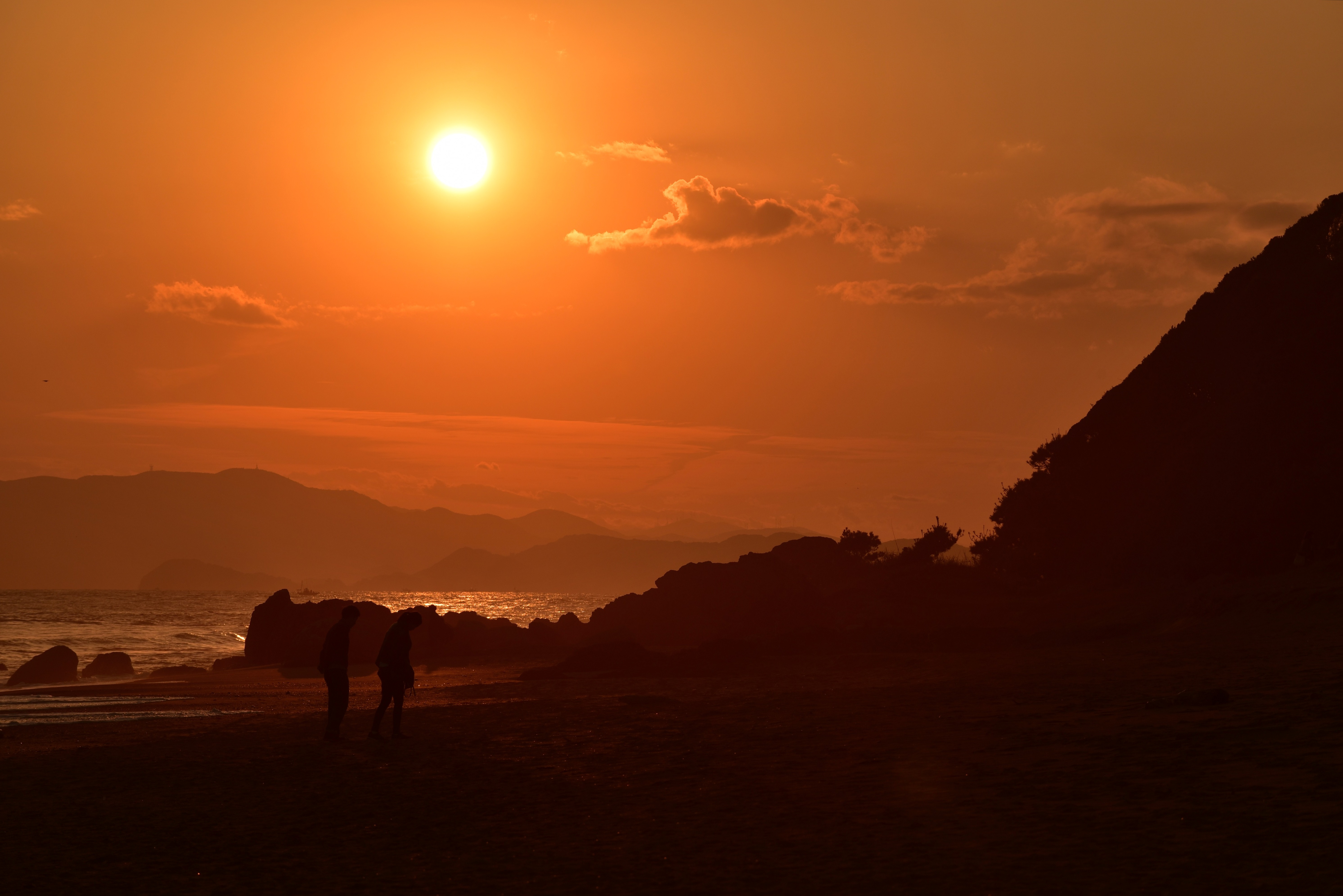
Koijigahama Beach

The Atsumi Peninsula (渥美半島, Atsumi Hantō) is a peninsula in southern Aichi Prefecture, central Honshū, Japan.

== Geography ==
It has an approximate length of 50 kilometres (31 mi) east-west, separating Mikawa Bay (to the north) from the Pacific Ocean to the south, with Ise Bay lying to its west. It faces the Chita Peninsula, to the northwest, across the entrance to Mikawa Bay. It has a width ranging from 5 kilometres (3.1 mi) to 8 kilometres (5.0 mi), and its highest point is 328 metres (1,076 ft). Its total area is approximately 200 square kilometers.

Atsumi Peninsula is noted for its temperate climate, due to the warm Kuroshio Current offshore. The rock formations at Cape Irago, its western tip, and its beaches are part of the Mikawa Wan Quasi-National Park. Administratively, almost all of the peninsula falls within the city of Tahara, with its eastern "neck" within the city of Toyohashi.

== History ==
Archaeological excavation of the Yoshigo Shell Midden and Ikawazu Shell Midden sites has provided evidence for human habitation of Atsumi Peninsula during the Jomon Period. During Japan's feudal period, Atsumi Peninsula was the majority of land under the Tahara Domain. After the fall of the Tokugawa shogunate during the Meiji period, the peninsula became the heart of Atsumi District, with over 30 autonomous towns and villages. From the late 19th to the mid-20th century, most towns merged with neighbors or were consolidated by the government, until there were only two towns left: Atsumi in the west, which included Cape Irago, and the city of Tahara, to the east, which had the only railroad on the peninsula and shared a border with the larger city of Toyohashi. In 2005, was absorbed into the city of Tahara, which now occupies the majority of the peninsula, with a small portion of the eastern end within the borders of Toyohashi.
