= Usuda =

Usuda may refer to:

== People ==
- Katsumi Usuda (born 1970), Japanese professional wrestler
- Kintaro Usuda (1906–1980), Japanese boxer

== Other uses ==
- Usuda, Nagano, town in Japan
- Usuda Deep Space Center, facility of the Japan Aerospace Exploration Agency
- Usuda Star Dome, public observatory in Japan
- Usuda Station, train station in Japan
