= Usuda Star Dome =

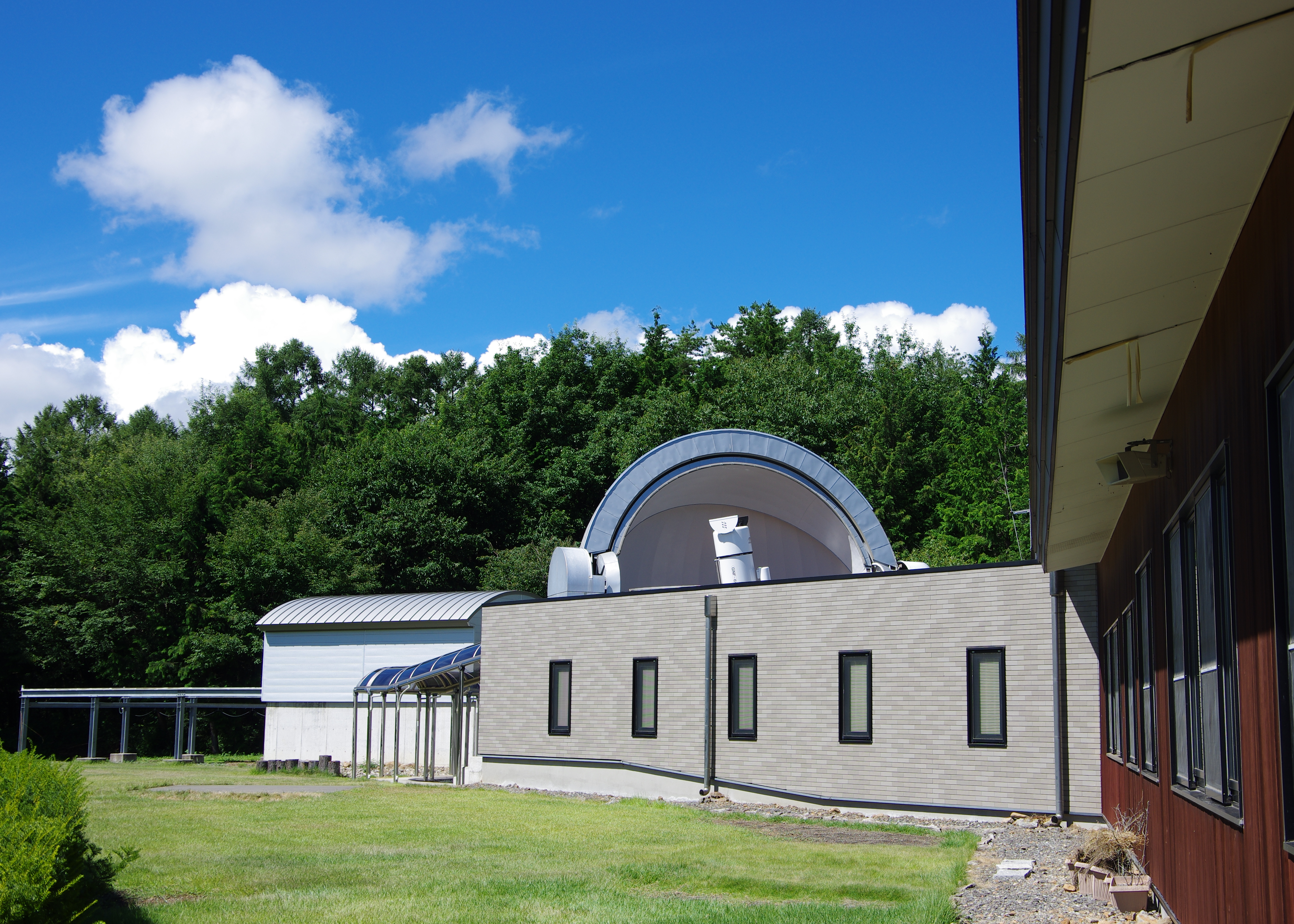
- Usuda Star Dome
- Organization: Saku City Board of Education
- Location: Saku, Nagano (JPN)
- Coordinates: 36.1929°N 138.4293°E
- Altitude: 935 m (3,068 ft)
- Established: November 29, 1996

Telescopes
- 600mm reflector: F12 Cassegrain
- 200mm refractor: F10
- 200mm refractor: F12

Location of Usuda Star Dome

Usuda Star Dome (うすだスタードーム) is a public observatory located in Saku, Nagano, Japan.

Saku is one of the best places for astronomical observation in Japan because of high altitude, high rate of sunny days, and limpid air.

Visitors are allowed to watch stars through the large telescope from 10 a.m. to 10 p.m.

== History ==
The observatory was founded by Usuda. It was transferred to (new) Saku on April 1, 2005 when Usuda has merged with (old) Saku, Mochizuki, and Asashina.

== Telescopes ==
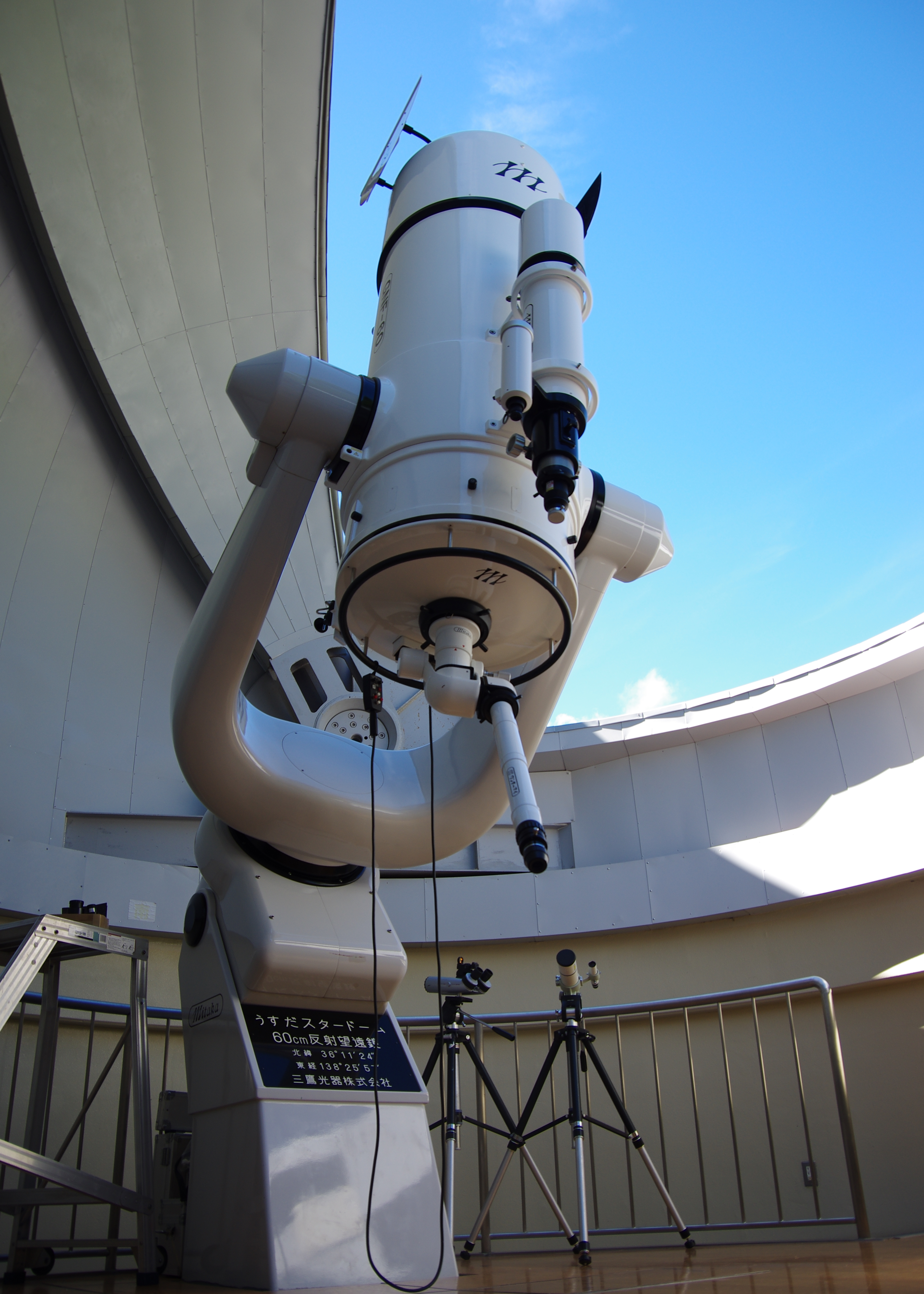
600 mm reflector

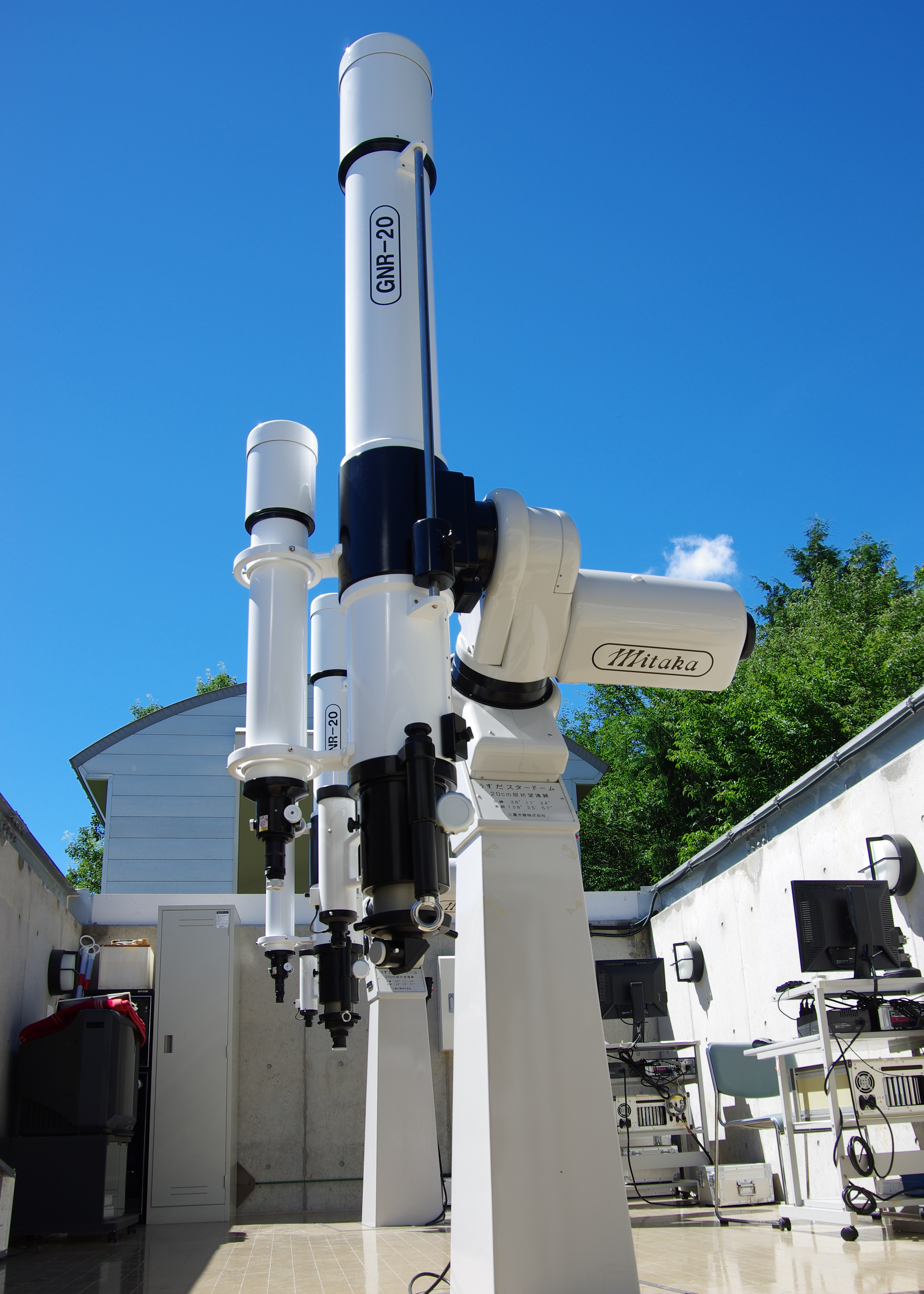
200 mm refractors

The main telescope of the observatory is 600 mm Cassegrain reflector constructed by Mitaka Kohki. It has the "Wonder Eye" flexible focal extending system which provides "barrier free" star watching.

It is also equipped with two 200 mm refractors also constructed by Mitaka Kohki.

== See also ==
- Saku
- Saku Children's Science Dome for the Future
- Usuda Deep Space Center
- List of astronomical observatories
- List of astronomical societies
- Lists of telescopes
