= Iwamurada Domain =

Japanese feudal domain under the Tokugawa shogunate

Iwamurada Domain 岩村田藩
- under Tokugawa shogunate Japan
- 1703–1871
- Capital: Iwamurada jin'ya
  - Type: Daimyō
- Historical era: Edo period
  - Established: 1703
  - Disestablished: 1871
- Today part of: Nagano Prefecture

Iwamurada Domain (岩村田藩, Iwamurada-han) was a feudal domain under the Tokugawa shogunate of Edo period Japan. It is located in Shinano Province, Honshū. The domain was centered at Iwamurada Jin’ya, located in what is now part of the city of Saku in Nagano Prefecture. It was ruled for all of its history by a junior branch of the Naitō clan.

== History ==
In 1703, Naito Masatomo, the daimyō of Akanuma Domain in Musashi Province exchanged his scattered holdings in Musashi, Kōzuke, Hitachi, Kazusa and Shimōsa Provinces for a holding consisting of 27 villages with an assessed kokudaka of 16,000 koku in Saku District in Shinano Province. This marked the start of Iwamurada Domain, which his descendants continued to rule uninterrupted until the Meiji restoration.

The 6th daimyō, Naito Masatsuna, was a brother of Mizuno Tadakuni and served as a rōjū in the administration of the Tokugawa shogunate. During his time, the status of the domain was upgraded to that of a “castle-holding domain”, although no castle was actually built.

During the Boshin War, the domain quickly supported the imperial side, and participated in the Battle of Utsunomiya Castle and Battle of Hokuetsu and Battle of Aizu. In July 1871, with the abolition of the han system, Iwamurada Domain briefly became Iwamurada Prefecture, and was merged into the newly created Nagano Prefecture. Under the new Meiji government, Naitō Masanobu, the last daimyō of Iwamurada Domain was given the kazoku peerage title of shishaku (viscount).

== Bakumatsu period holdings ==
As with most domains in the han system, Iwamurada Domain consisted of several discontinuous territories calculated to provide the assigned kokudaka, based on periodic cadastral surveys and projected agricultural yields.

- Shinano Province
  - 4 villages in Chiiisagata District
  - 20 villages in Saku District

== List of daimyō ==
#	Name	Tenure	Courtesy title	Court Rank	kokudaka	Notes
Naitō clan (fudai) 1703-1871
1	Naitō Masatomo (内藤正友)	1703-1711	Shikibu-shōyu (式部少輔)	Lower 5th (従五位下)	16,000 koku	transfer from Akanuma Domain
2	Naitō Masayuki (内藤正敬)	1711-1746	Shimōsa-no-kami (下総守)	Lower 5th (従五位下)	16,000 koku	
3	Naitō Masasuke (内藤正弼)	1746-1770	Mino-no-kami (美濃守)	Lower 5th (従五位下)	16,000->15,000 koku	
4	Naitō Masaoki (内藤正興)	1770-1792	Shima-no-kami (志摩守)	Lower 5th (従五位下)	15,000 koku	
5	Naitō Masakuni (内藤正国)	1792-1802	Mino-no-kami (美濃守)	Lower 5th (従五位下)	15,000 koku	
6	Naitō Masatsuna (内藤正縄)	1802-1860	Bungo-no-kami (豊後守)	Lower 5th (従五位下)	15,000 koku	
7	Naitō Masaakira (内藤正誠)	1860-1871	Shima-no-kami (志摩守)	Lower 5th (従五位下)	15,000 koku	

== See also ==
List of Han
