= Shinshu Junior College =

Coordinates: 36°15′57.5″N 138°27′47.2″E

- 佐久大学信州短期大学部
- Type: Private
- Established: 1988
- Affiliations: Saku Educational Institute
- President: Hirofusa Shirai
- Academic staff: 30
- Administrative staff: 5
- Students: 100
- Undergraduates: 100
- Location: Saku, Nagano, 385-0022, Japan
- Language: Japanese
- Website: www.saku.ac.jp/tanki/ (in Japanese)

Shinshu Junior College (信州短期大学, Shinshū tanki daigaku) is a private junior college in Saku, Nagano, Japan, established in 1988.

== History ==
- 1988 Shinshu Junior College (Faculty of Business) was established.
- 2001 The name of Faculty of Business was changed to Faculty of Business and Information.
- 2002 Faculty of Life Management was established.
- 2006 Health and Sports Division and Care and Welfare Division was founded in Faculty of Life Management.
- 2010 Faculty of Life Management was reorganized to Faculty of Care and Welfare. The name of Faculty of Business and Information was changed to Faculty of Integrated Business.
- 2013 Faculty of Integrated Business was closed.

== Faculties ==
- Faculty of Care and Welfare
  - Care Course
  - Business Course

== See also ==
- Saku University
