= Saku Children's Science Dome for the Future =

- 佐久市子ども未来館
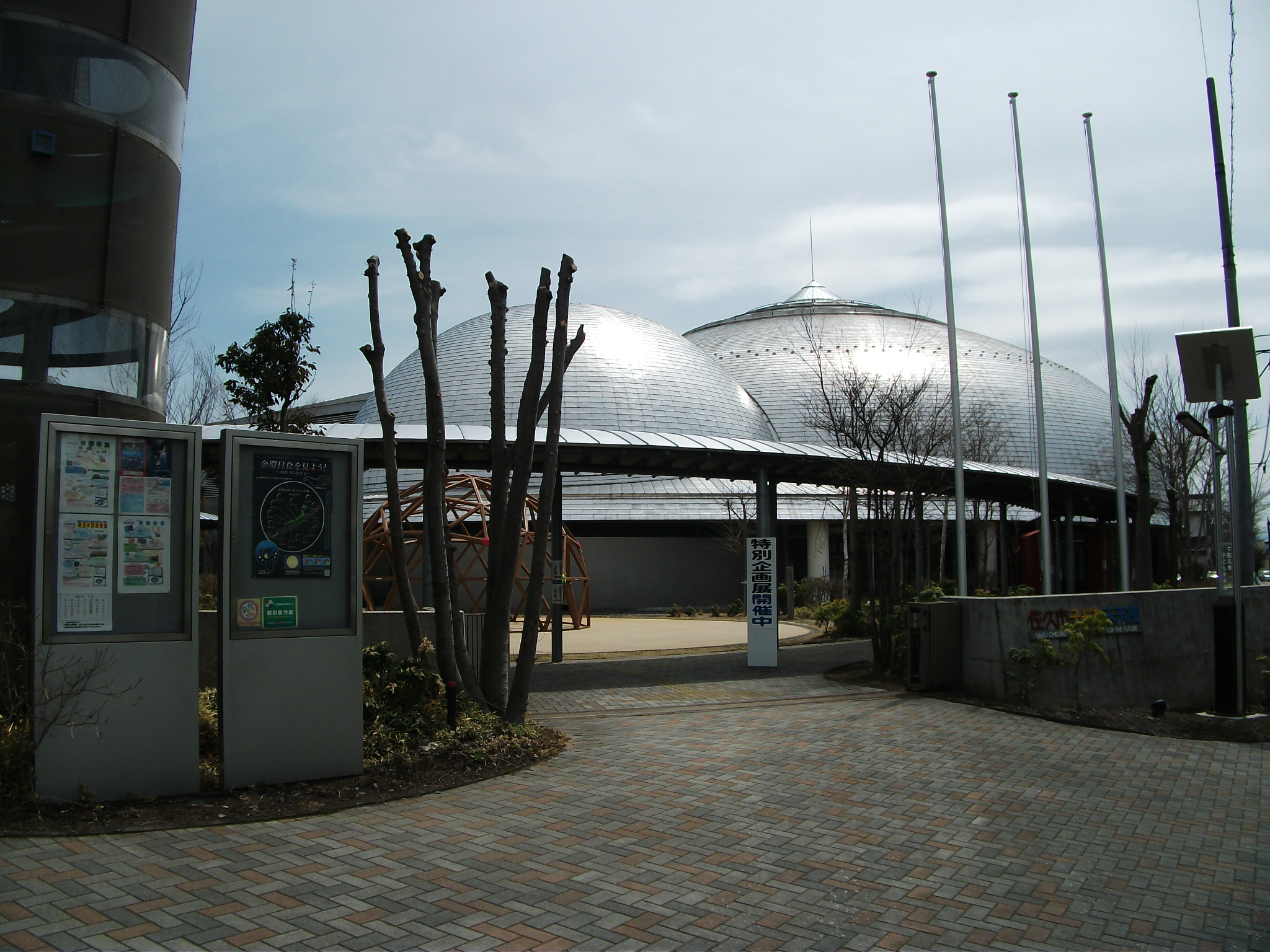
- Saku Children's Science Dome for the Future

- Location within Japan
- Established: 21 March 2001
- Location: Saku, Nagano, Japan
- Coordinates: 36°16′17.76″N 138°28′32.88″E
- Type: Science museum
- Collections: Earth science, Astronautics, Biology
- Director: Naoya Shimazaki
- Owner: Government of the City of Saku
- Public transit access: Iwamurada Station
- Parking: On site
- Website: kodomomiraikan.jp (in Japanese)

Saku Children's Science Dome for the Future (佐久市子ども未来館) is a science museum located in Saku, Nagano, Japan. The mission of the museum is "Bringing up of highly creative children through spreading and enlightening them of scientific knowledge".

The architecture and landscape of the museum were designed by Mitsuru Senda and Environment Design Institute.

The museum has a variety of exhibits on earth science, space, biotechnology, and the environment. Some of the attractions that gain the attention of the children are a life-size model of a Brachiosaurus, a 170-seat planetarium with GSS-URANUS (Goto, Inc.) and a display model of the "Mercury" spacecraft presented by NASA.

== See also ==
- Kimiya Yui (Honorary director)
- City of Saku
- Usuda Star Dome
