= Shinano Province =

Former province of Japan

Map of Japanese provinces (1868) with Shinano Province highlighted.

Shinano Province (信濃国, Shinano no Kuni; Japanese pronunciation: [ɕí.nä̀.nò̞ (nò̞ kɯ̈̀.ɲ̟ì), ɕì.nä́.nó̞ (nò̞ kɯ̈̀.ɲ̟ì)]) or Shinshū (信州; [ɕíɰ̃̀.ɕɨ̀ɨ̀]) is an old province of Japan that is now Nagano Prefecture.

Shinano bordered Echigo, Etchū, Hida, Kai, Kōzuke, Mikawa, Mino, Musashi, Suruga, and Tōtōmi Provinces. The ancient capital was located near modern-day Matsumoto, which became an important city of the province.

The World War II-era Japanese aircraft carrier Shinano was named after this old province.

== Historical record ==
In 713, the road that traverses Mino and Shinano provinces was widened to accommodate increasing numbers of travelers through the Kiso District of modern Nagano Prefecture.

In the Sengoku period, Shinano Province was often split among fiefs and castle towns developed, including Komoro, Ina, and Ueda. Shinano was one of the major centers of Takeda Shingen's power during his wars with Uesugi Kenshin and others.

During the Azuchi–Momoyama period, after Nobunaga's assassination at Honnō-ji Incident, the province was contested between Tokugawa Ieyasu and the Go-Hōjō clan based in Odawara castle. The Tokugawa clan, The Uesugi clan and the Hōjō clan each aspired to seize the vast area in Shinano Province, Ueno region, and Kai Province, which ruled by the remnants of the many small clans formerly serving the Takeda clan. Following of disorder post death of Nobunaga, at the same time with Ieyasu departure an army of 8,000 soldiers to those disputed region. This caused the triangle conflict between those three factions in the event which dubbed by historians as Tenshō-Jingo War broke out. (Note: The name of "Tenshō-Jingo War" was coined by Tashiro Takashi in 1980. Furthermore, is also a theory that from the perspective that local powers which continued to fight over the possession of the Oda clan's leftover territories, there is evidence that Tokugawa Ieyasu's transfer to the Kantō region following the fall of the Hōjō clan in 1590 and the placement of Toyotomi-line daimyo, until transfer of Uesugi Kagekatsu to Aizu, where the local daimyo were separated from their former territory and the establishment of control by the Azuchi–Momoyama period, was considered to be the extension of this conflict.) As the war turned in favor of Tokugawa clan, combined with the defection of Sanada Masayuki to the Tokugawa faction, the Hōjō clan now negotiate truce with Ieyasu and The Go-Hōjō clan then sent Hōjō Ujinobu as representative, while the Tokugawa sent Ii Naomasa as representative for the preliminary meetings. Furthermore, In October, representatives from the Oda clan such as Oda Nobukatsu, Oda Nobutaka, and Toyotomi mediated the negotiation until the truce officially concluded.

Suwa taisha was designated as the chief Shinto shrine (ichinomiya) for the province.

In 1871, during the Meiji period, with the abolition of the han system and the establishment of prefectures (Haihan Chiken) after the Meiji Restoration, Shinano Province's ex-domains/1871 prefectures and ex-shogunate territories/1868 prefectures (mainly Ina [merger of several shogunate demesne administrations with parts of Matsumoto], Okutono, Iwamurada, Komoro, Ueda, Matsushiro, Suzaka, Iiyama, Suwa/Takashima, Takatō, Iida, Matsumoto) and Takayama/Hida which covered Hida Province were administratively merged into Nagano (initially Nakano Prefecture in 1870) and Chikuma prefectures. The seat of the prefectural government of Nakano was Nakano town from Takai District (became Nakano City in 1954), Nagano's prefectural capital was Nagano town in Minochi District (→Nagano City in 1897), and Chikuma's capital was Matsumoto town, Chikuma district (Matsumoto City from 1907). In the second wave of prefectural mergers in 1875/76, Chikuma was split again: the Western part covering Hida Province was merged into Gifu, and the Eastern part in Shinano became part of Nagano. Since that time, Nagano is essentially contiguous to Shinano.

== Historical districts ==
Shinano Province consisted of sixteen districts:

- Nagano Prefecture
  - Azumi District (安曇郡)
    - Kitaazumi District (北安曇郡)
    - Minamiazumi District (南安曇郡) – dissolved
  - Chiisagata District (小県郡)
  - Chikuma District (筑摩郡)
    - Higashichikuma District (東筑摩郡)
    - Nishichikuma District (西筑摩郡) – renamed as Kiso District (木曽郡) on May 1, 1968
  - Hanishina District (埴科郡)
  - Minochi District (水内郡)
    - Kamiminochi District (上水内郡)
    - Shimominochi District (下水内郡)
  - Saku District (佐久郡)
    - Kitasaku District (北佐久郡)
    - Minamisaku District (南佐久郡)
  - Sarashina District (更級郡) – dissolved
  - Takai District (高井郡)
    - Kamitakai District (上高井郡)
    - Shimotakai District (下高井郡)
- Former Suwa Province:
  - Ina District (伊那郡)
    - Kamiina District (上伊那郡)
    - Shimoina District (下伊那郡)
  - Suwa District (諏訪郡)

== See also ==
- Tomono clan
- Iiyama Domain
- Suzaka Domain
- Matsushiro Domain
- Ueda Domain
- Komoro Domain
- Matsumoto Domain
- Okutono Domain
- Suwa Domain
- Takatō Domain
- Ōhama Domain

== Appendix ==
=== Bibliography ===
- Hirayama, Yū (2011), 武田遺領をめぐる動乱と秀吉の野望 [Takeda's Territory and Hideyoshi's Ambitions], 戎光祥出版, ISBN 978-4-86403-035-9
- Hirayama, Yū (2015). 天正壬午の乱 [Tensho-Jingo war] (増補改訂版 ed.). 戎光祥出版. ISBN 978-4-86403-170-7.
- Nussbaum, Louis-Frédéric and Käthe Roth. (2005). Japan encyclopedia. Cambridge: Harvard University Press. ISBN 978-0-674-01753-5; OCLC 58053128.
- Hiroaki Sato (2008). Japanese women poets: an anthology. M.E. Sharpe, Inc.
- Titsingh, Isaac. (1834). Annales des empereurs du Japon (Nihon Ōdai Ichiran). Paris: Royal Asiatic Society, Oriental Translation Fund of Great Britain and Ireland. OCLC 5850691.
