= Mochizuki, Nagano =

Mochizuki 望月町
- Town
- Mochizuki-machi
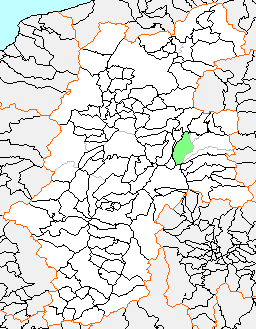
- Location of Mochizuki in Nagano

- Location in Japan
- Coordinates: 36°15′51.8″N 138°21′44.1″E
- Country: Japan
- Prefecture: Nagano
- District: Kitasaku
- Merged: April 1, 2005 (now part of Saku)

Area
  - Total: 128.64 km^{2} (49.67 sq mi)

Population (2003)
  - Total: 10,440
  - Density: 81.16/km^{2} (210.2/sq mi)
- Time zone: UTC+09:00 (JST)

Mochizuki (望月町, Mochizuki-machi) was a town located in Kitasaku District, Nagano Prefecture, Japan.

As of 2003, the town had an estimated population of 10,440 and a density of 81.16 persons per km^{2}. The total area was 128.64 km^{2}.

== History ==
- c. 1875 The town of Mochizukishinden merged into the town of Mochizuki in Saku District. The village of Kannonjishinden merged into the village of Motai. The villages of Irikatakura, Iwashita, and Kasugashinmachi merged into the village of Kasuga. The village of Makifuse, Irifuse, Shikibu, Nukui, Nakai, Kutsuzawashinden, and Maeyamasanshinden merged to form the village of Fuse.
- c. 1876 The village of Katakura, Hidai, Tenjinbayashi, Oyachishinden, Kodaira, Mitsui, and Koro merged to form the village of Kyowa.
- c. 1879 Kitasaku District government enforced. The town of Mochizuki and the villages of Innai, Motai, Kasuga, Fuse, and Kyowa belongs to Kitasaku District.
- April 1, 1889 The city, town, and village status enforced.
  - The town of Mochizuki and the villages of Innai and Motai merged to form the village of Motomaki.
  - The village of Kasuga was formed without merging.
  - The village of Fuse was founded without merging.
  - The village of Kyowa was founded without merging.
- April 1, 1954 The village of Motomaki gained town status.
- April 1, 1959 The town of Motomaki and the villages of Kasuga, Fuse, and Kyowa merged to reform the town of Mochizuki.

(The town of Mochizuki was once dissolved since March 31, 1889)

- April 15, 1960 Motai area from the former town of Motomaki broke off and went to the town of Tateshina.
- April 1, 2005 Mochizuki, along with the town of Usuda (from Minamisaku District), and the village of Asashina (also from Kitasaku District), was merged into the expanded city of Saku.

== Sightseeing ==
- Mochizuki-shuku
- Kasuga Onsen
- Museum of Mochizuki History and Folklore
- Tenrai Museum of Calligraphy
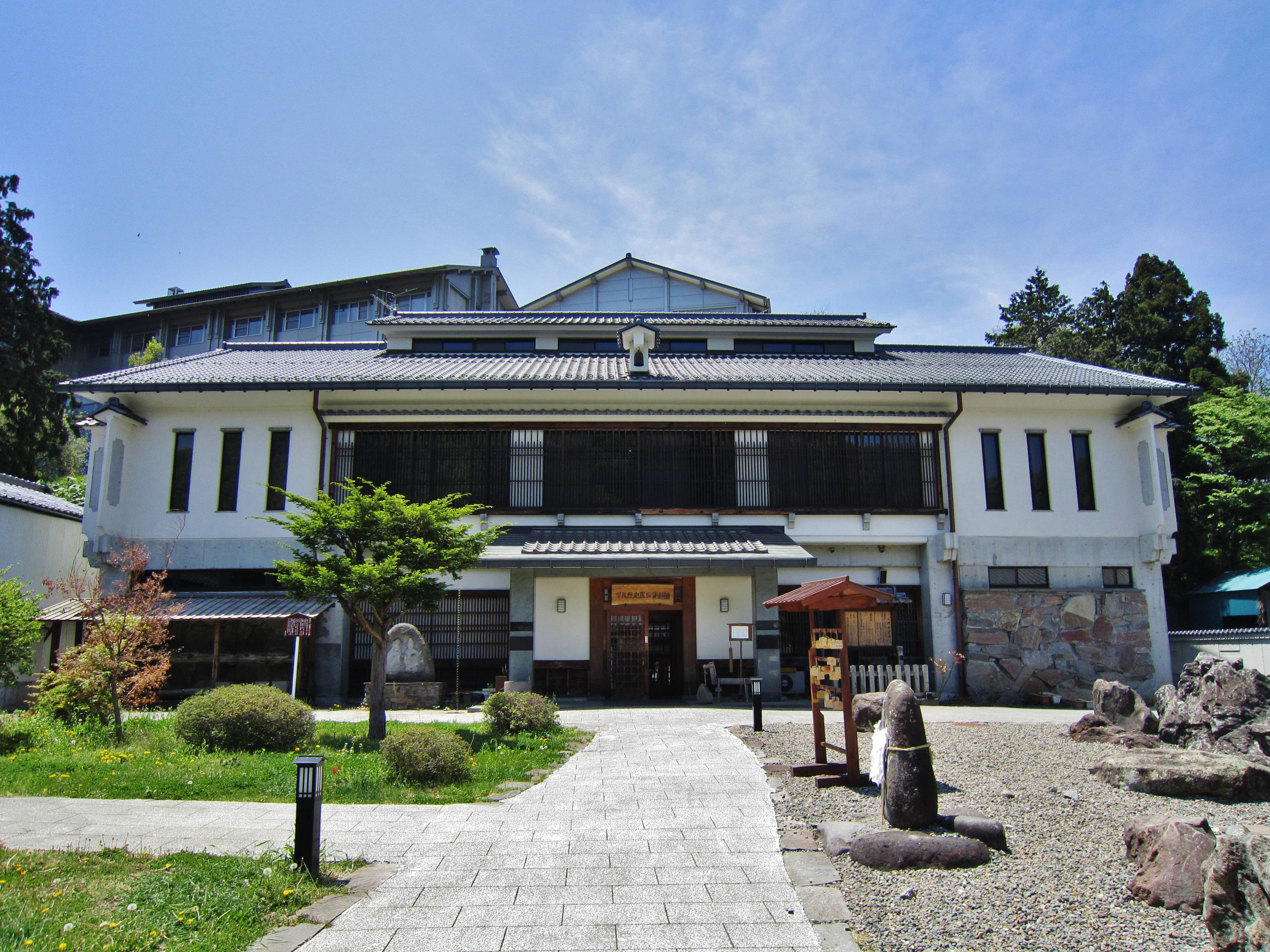
Museum of Mochizuki History and Folklore

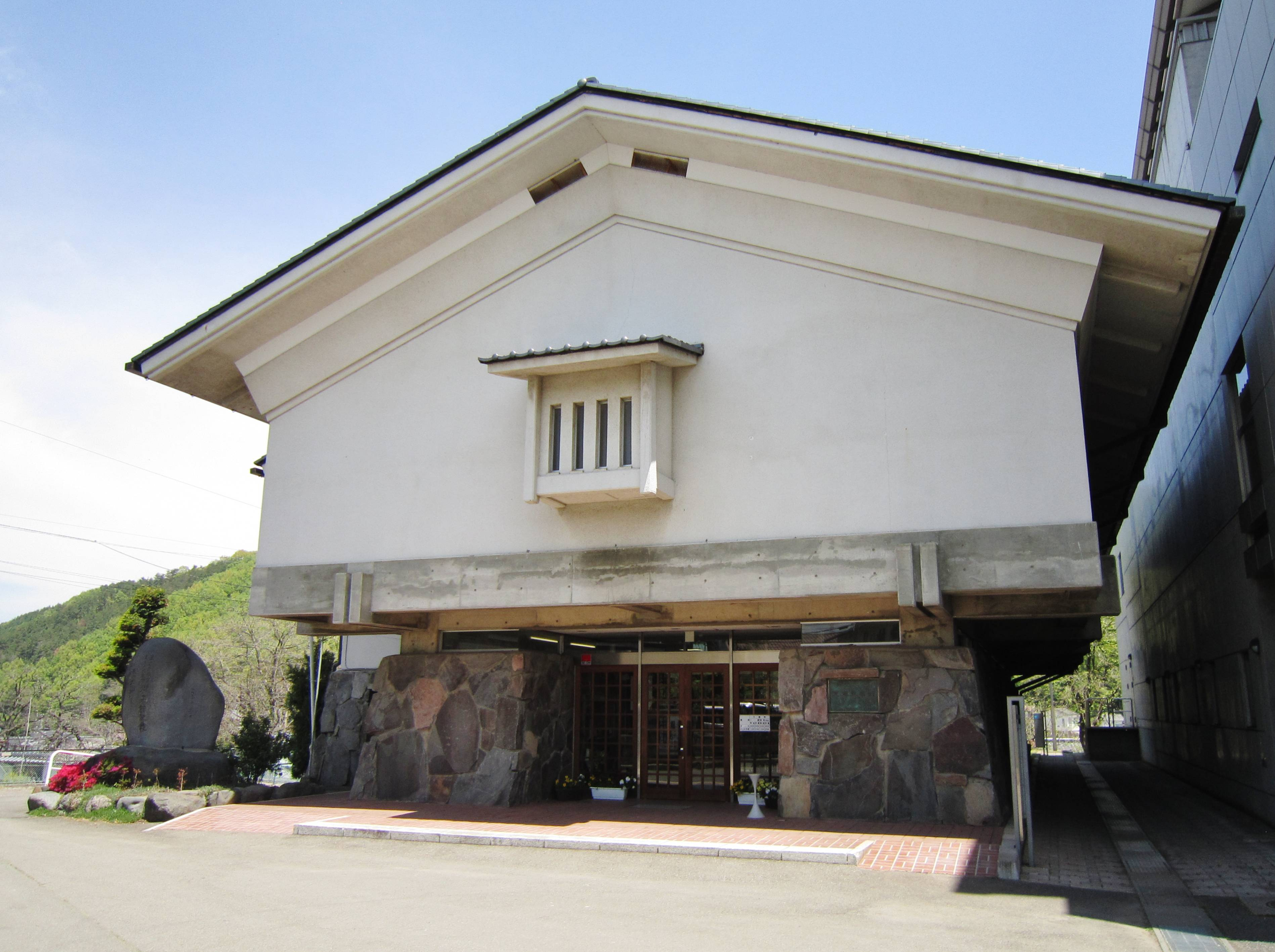
Tenrai Museum of Calligraphy
