= Aonuma Station =

Railway station in Saku, Nagano Prefecture, Japan

Aonuma Station 青沼駅
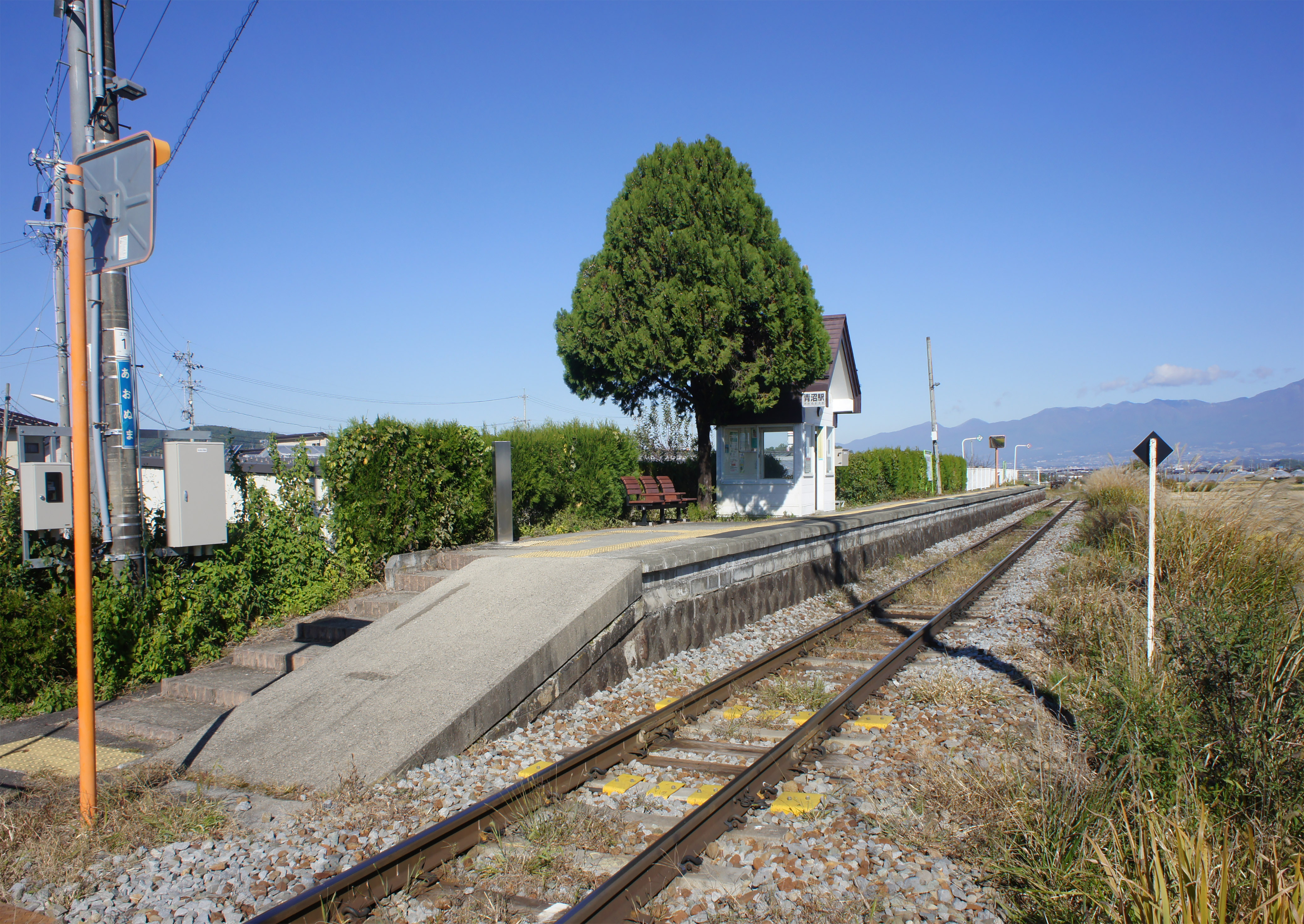
- Aonuma Station, October 2021

General information
- Location: Irisawa, Saku-shi, Nagano-ken 384-0621; Japan
- Coordinates: 36.1812°N 138.4894°E
- Elevation: 722.6 meters
- Operator: JR East
- Line: ■ Koumi Line
- Distance: 59.5 km from Kobuchizawa
- Platforms: 1 side platform

Other information
- Status: Unstaffed
- Website: Official website

History
- Opened: 8 December 1915
- Former names: Irisawa Station (to 1952)

Passengers
- FY2011: 38

Services
Preceding station	JR East	Following station
Usuda towards Komoro	Koumi Line	Haguroshita towards Kobuchizawa
Location
- Location within Nagano Prefecture Location within Japan

Aonuma Station (青沼駅, Aonuma-eki) is a train station in the city of Saku, Nagano, Japan, operated by East Japan Railway Company (JR East).

== Lines ==
Aonuma Station is served by the Koumi Line and is 59.5 kilometers from the terminus of the line at Kobuchizawa Station.

== Station layout ==
The station consists of one ground-level side platform serving a single bi-directional track. The station is unattended.

== History ==
Aonuma Station opened on 28 December 1915 as the Irisawa Stop (入沢停留場). It was elevated to a full station on 1 September 1934. The station was closed from 1944 to 1952. It was renamed to its present name on reopening on 1 March 1952. With the dissolution and privatization of JNR on April 1, 1987, the station came under the control of the East Japan Railway Company (JR East).

== Surrounding area ==
- National Route 141

== See also ==
- List of railway stations in Japan
