= Usuda, Nagano =

Town in Japan

Usuda 臼田町
- Town
- Usuda-machi
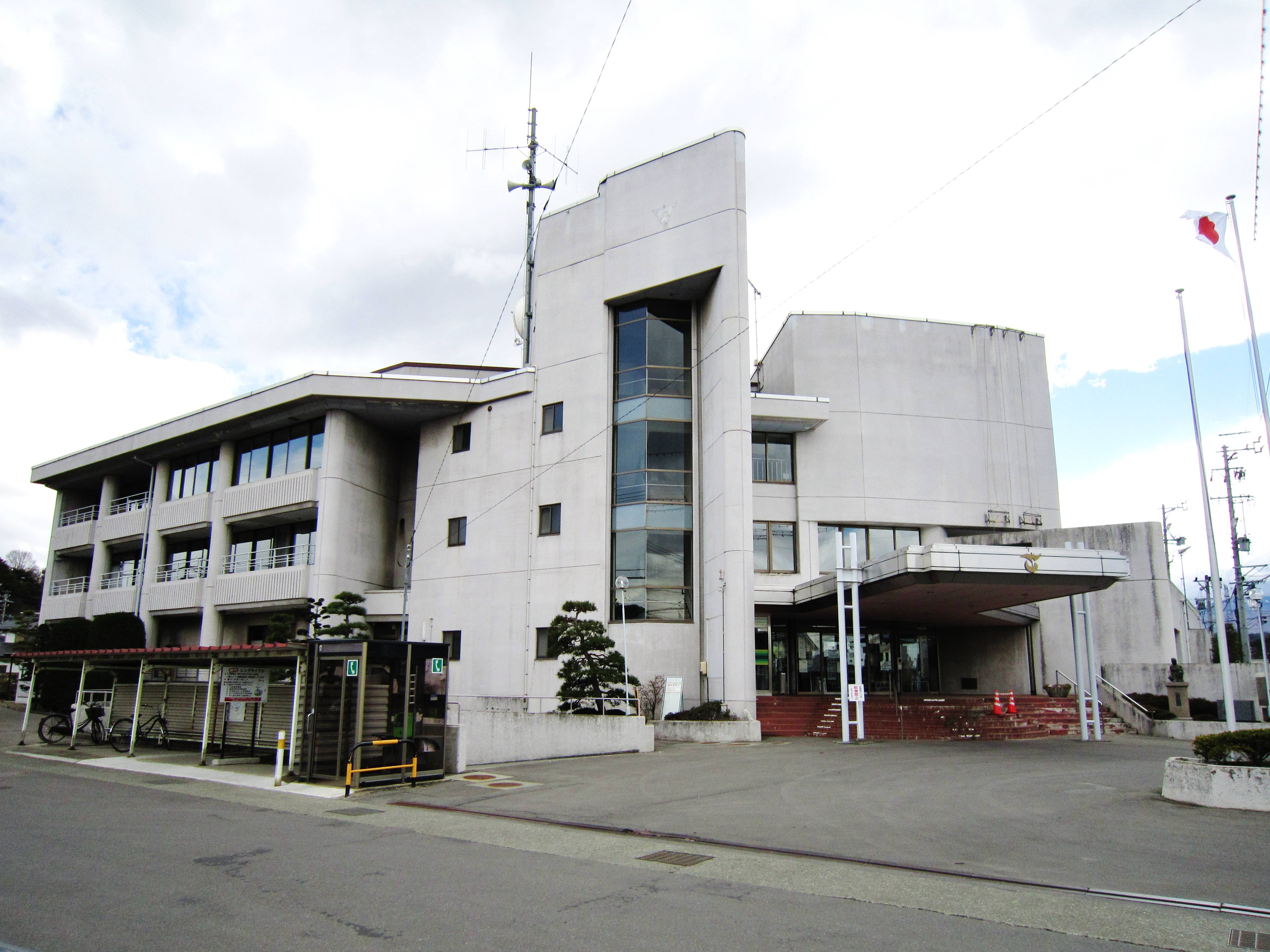
- Former Usuda town hall

- Flag Seal

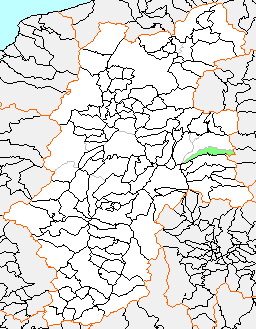
- Location of Usuda in Nagano

- Location in Japan
- Coordinates: 36°11′43.9″N 138°28′45.2″E
- Country: Japan
- Prefecture: Nagano
- District: Minamisaku
- Merged: April 1, 2005 (now part of Saku)

Area
  - Total: 83.21 km^{2} (32.13 sq mi)

Population (2003)
  - Total: 15,731
  - Density: 189.05/km^{2} (489.6/sq mi)
- Time zone: UTC+09:00 (JST)

Usuda (臼田町, Usuda-machi) was a town located in Minamisaku District, Nagano Prefecture, Japan. It is the farthest point in the country away from the sea, although the nearby town of Saku claims to hold this distinction as well.

As of 2003, the town has an estimated population of 15,731 and a density of 189.05 persons per km^{2}. The total area is 83.21 km^{2}.

== History ==
- c. 1875 The village of Yuhara absorbed the village of Yuharashinden in Saku District.
- August 2, 1876 The villages of Tanokuchi and Kaminakagomi merged into the village of Taguchi.
- c. 1879 Minamisaku District government enforced. The villages of Usuda, Shimootagiri, Katsuma, Kamiotagiri, Nakaotagiri, Nakaotagirishinden, Yuhara, Mibun, Shimogoe, Taguchi, Irisawa and Hirabayashi belongs to Minamisaku District.
- April 1, 1889 The city, town, and village status enforced.
  - The village of Usuda absorbed the villages of Shimootagiri and Katsuma.
  - The villages of Kamiotagiri, Nakaotagiri, Nakaotagirishinden and Yuhara merged to form the village of Kirihara.
  - The village of Taguchi absorbed the villages of Mibun and Shimogoe, and the former village of Kiyokawa in the village of Tokiwa.
  - The villages of Irisawa and Hirabayashi merged to form the village of Aonuma.
- June 30, 1951 The village of Usuda gained town status.
- August 1, 1955 The town of Usuda absorbed the village of Kirihara.
- September 30, 1956 The villages of Taguchi and Aonuma merged to form the village of Taguchiaonuma.
- April 1, 1957 The town of Usuda absorbed the village of Taguchiaonuma.
- April 1, 1959 Sohara, Haguroshita and Hirabayashi area from the former village of Taguchiaonuma broke off and went to the town of Saku.
- April 1, 2005, Usuda, along with the town of Mochizuki, and the village of Asashina (both from Kitasaku District), was merged into the expanded city of Saku.

== Town of star shine ==
- The people of Usuda declare Usuda to be "town of star shine" in 1995. There are some notable spots connected with stars, for example, Usuda Deep Space Center, Usuda Star Dome, Cosmo Tower, and Tatsuoka Castle Site (a star fort).
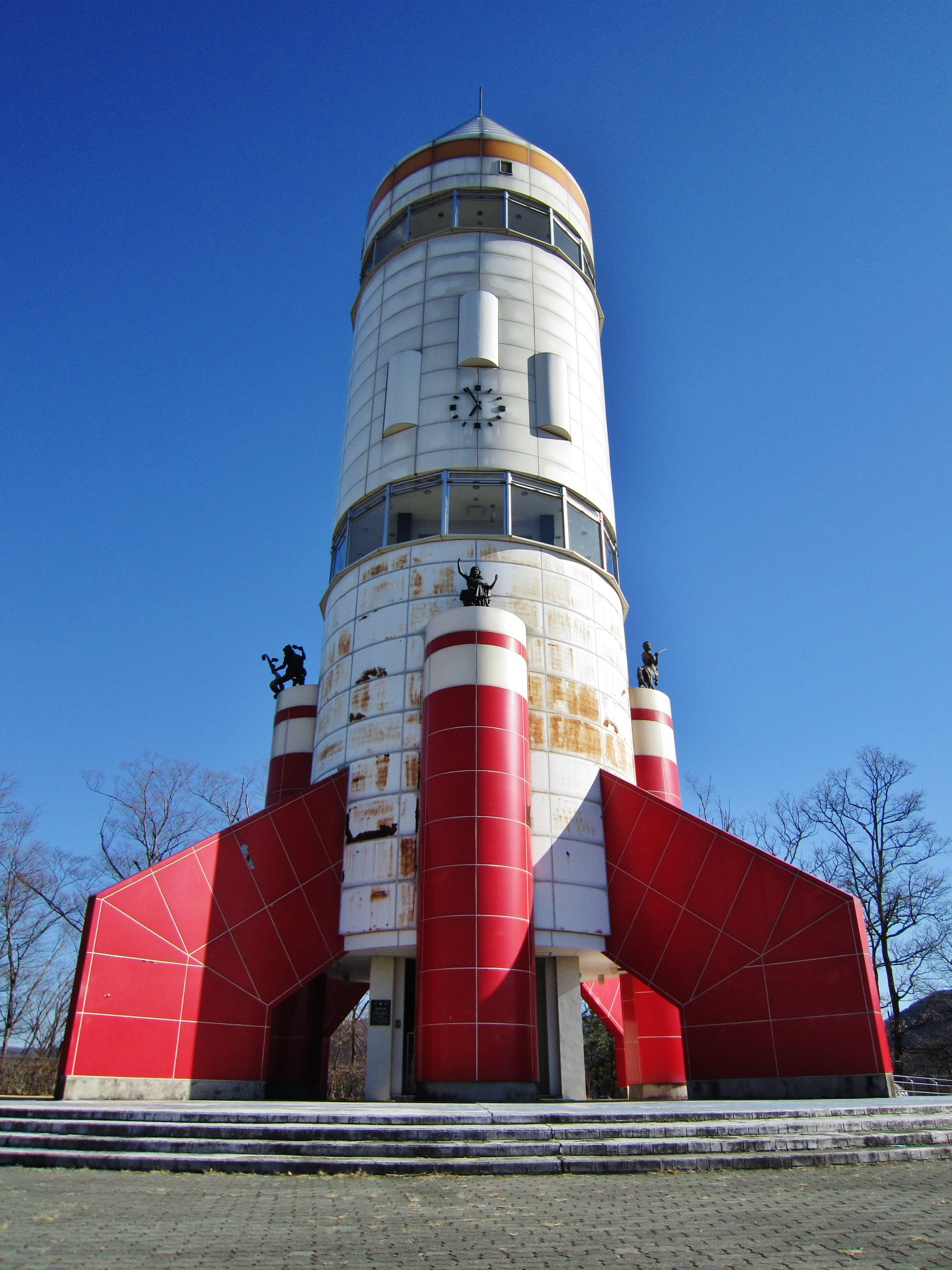
Cosmo Tower

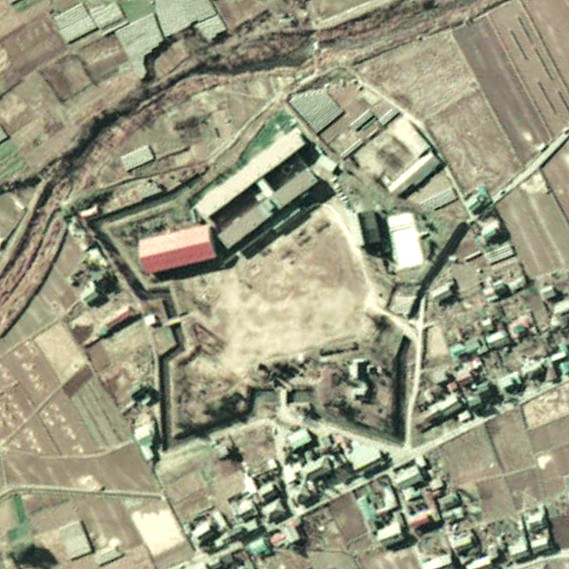
Tatsuoka Castle Site
