= Asashina, Nagano =

Asashina 浅科村
- Village
- Asashina-mura
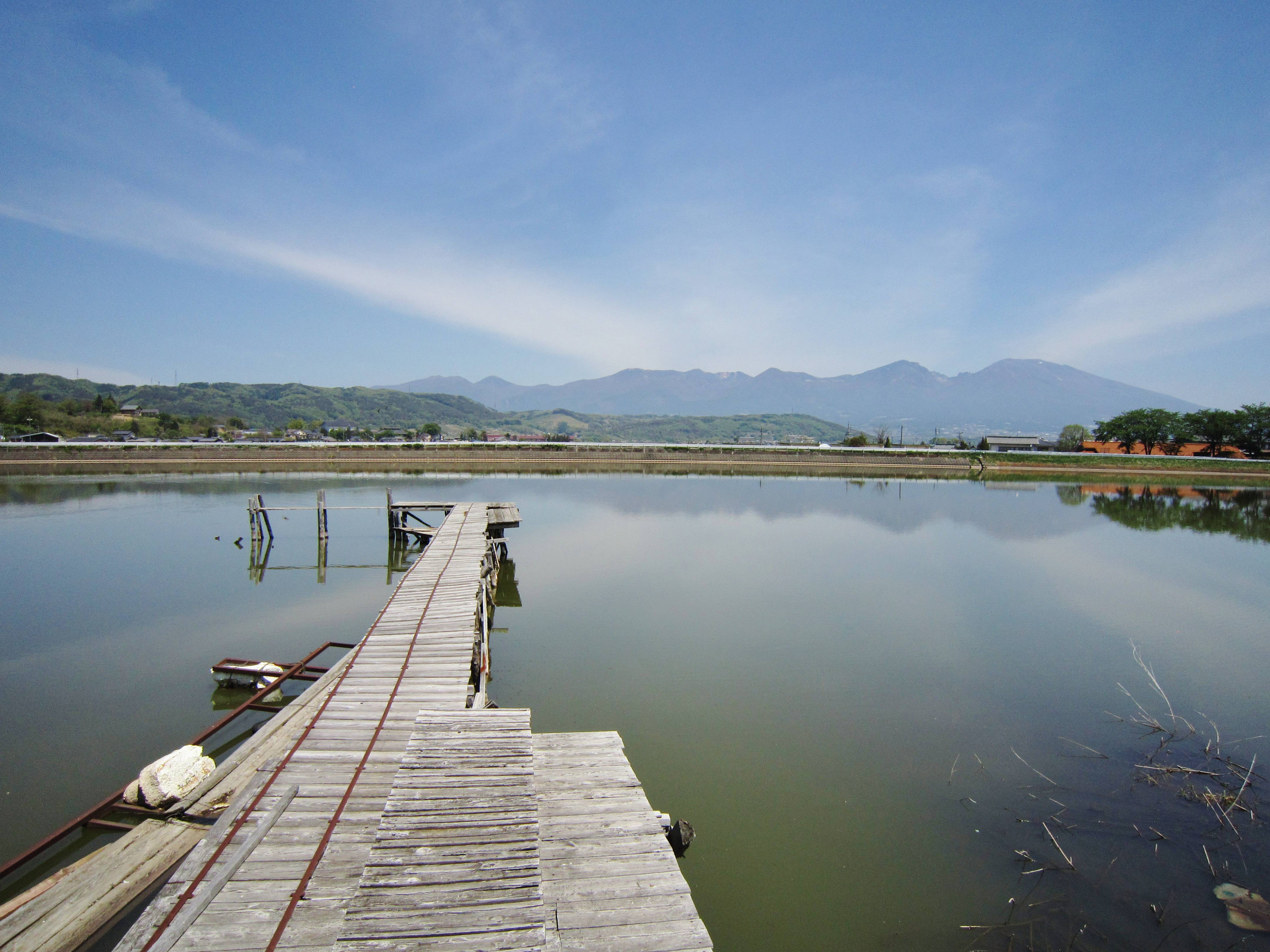
- Asashina Ōike

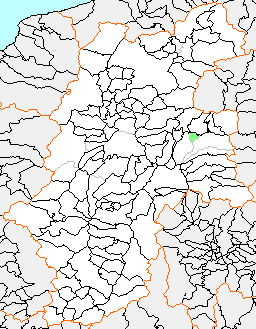
- Location of Asashina in Nagano

- Location in Japan
- Coordinates: 36°16′27.4″N 138°24′18.2″E
- Country: Japan
- Prefecture: Nagano
- District: Kitasaku
- Merged: April 1, 2005 (now part of Saku)

Area
  - Total: 19.52 km^{2} (7.54 sq mi)

Population (2003)
  - Total: 6,423
  - Density: 329.05/km^{2} (852.2/sq mi)
- Time zone: UTC+09:00 (JST)

Asashina (浅科村, Asashina-mura) was a village located in Kitasaku District, Nagano Prefecture, Japan.

As of 2003, the village had an estimated population of 6,423 and a density of 329.05 persons per km^{2}. The total area was 19.52 km^{2}.

== History ==
- May 30, 1876 The village of Shionada absorbed the village of Ichizaemonshinden in Saku District.
- c. 1879 Kitasaku District government enforced. The villages of Shionada, Mimayose, Gorobēshinden, Yawata, Yomogita, Kuwayama, and Yashima belongs to Kitasaku District.
- April 1, 1889 The city, town, and village status enforced.
  - The villages of Shionada and Mimayose merged to form the village of Nakatsu.
  - The villages of Yawata, Yomogita, Kuwayama and Yashima merged to form the village of Minamimimaki.
- January 15, 1955 The villages of Nakatsu, Gorobēshinden and Minamimimaki merged to form the village of Asashina.
- April 1, 2005 Asashina, along with the town of Usuda (from Minamisaku District), and the town of Mochizuki (also from Kitasaku District), was merged into the expanded city of Saku.

== Sightseeing ==
- Shionada-shuku
- Michi-no-Eki Hotpark Asashina
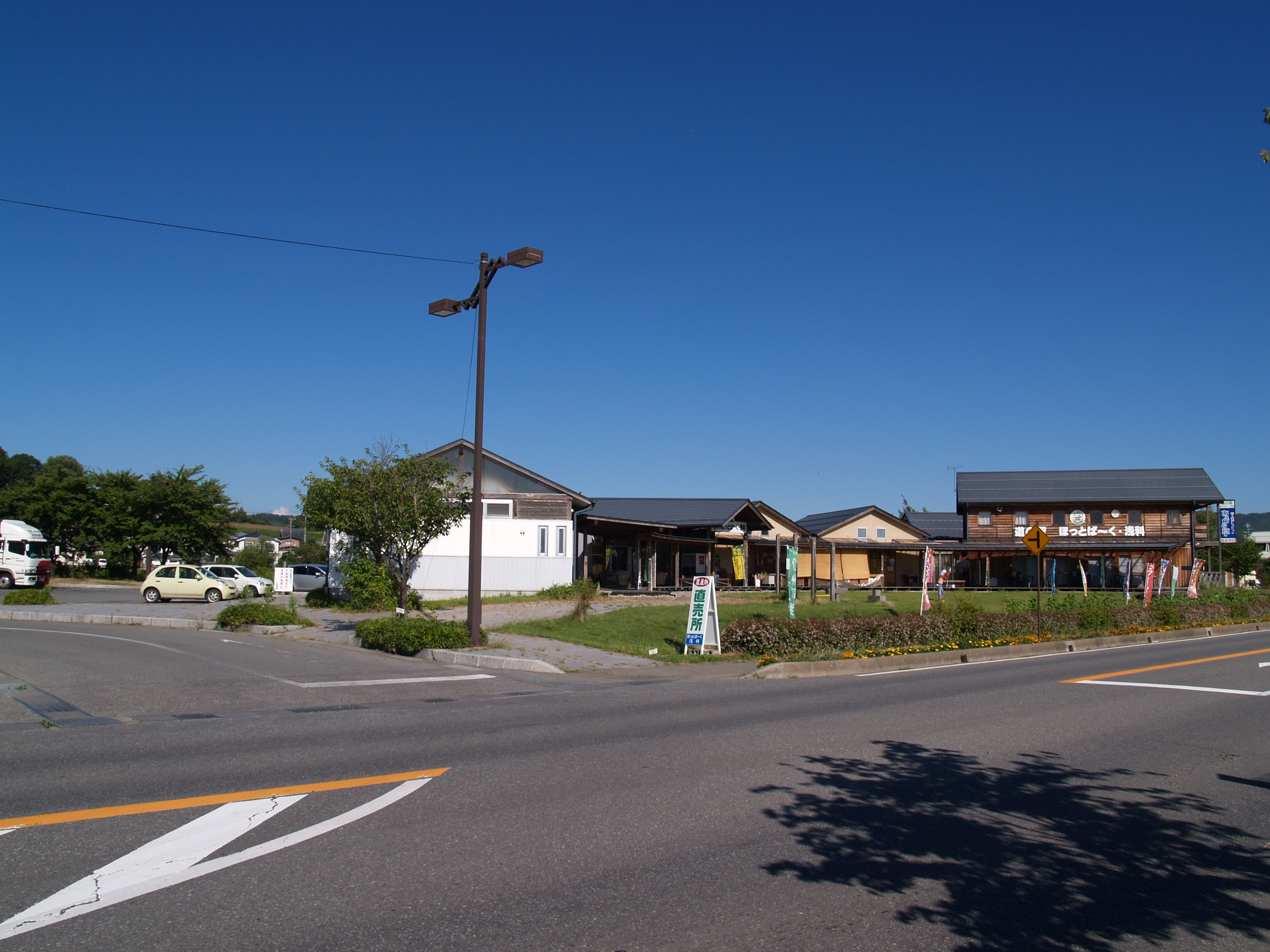
Hotpark Asashina
