= Ōtabe Station =

Railway station in Saku, Nagano Prefecture, Japan

Ōtabe Station 太田部駅
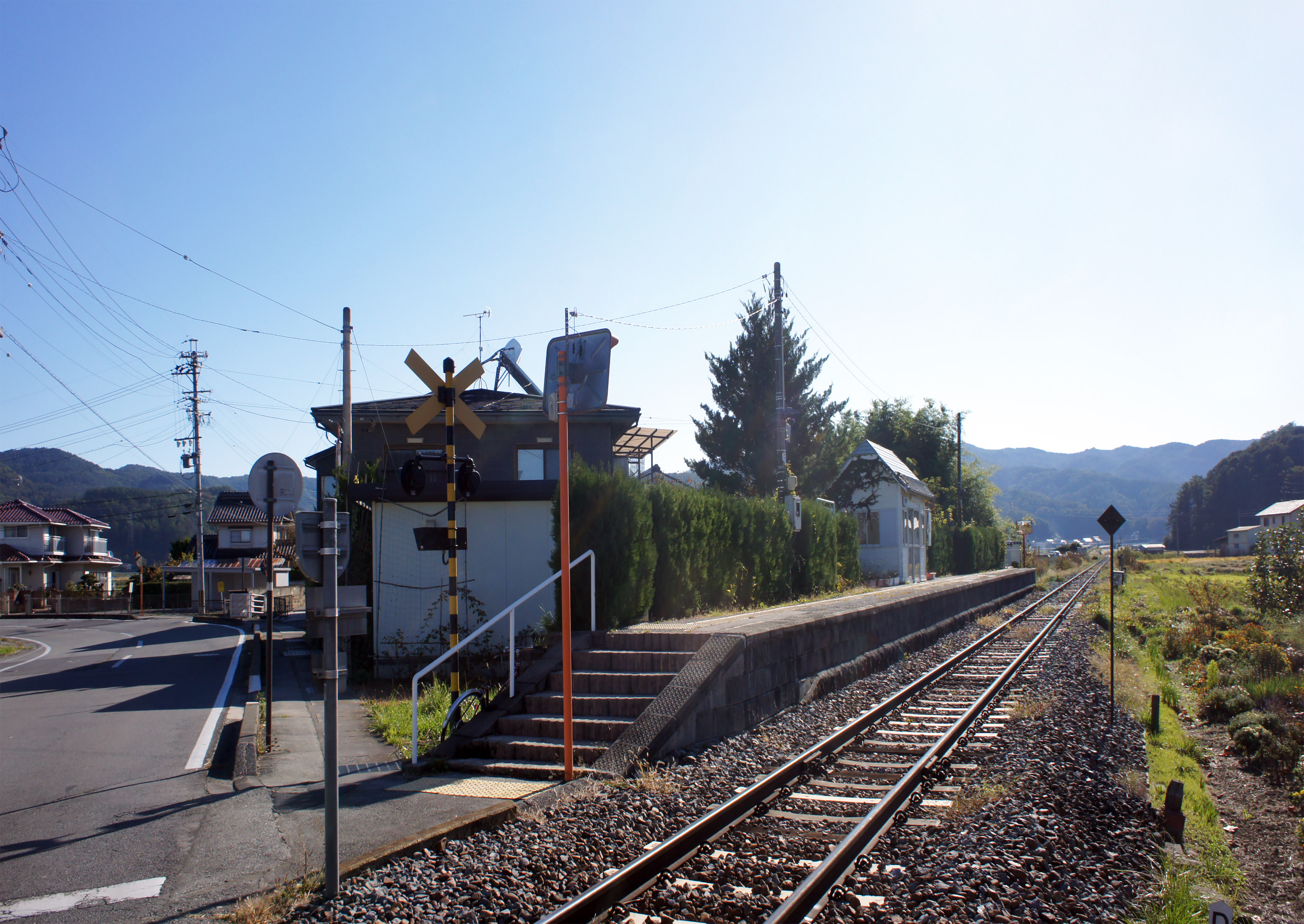
- Ōtabe Station, October 2021

General information
- Location: Ōtabe, Saku-shi, Nagano-ken 385-00331; Japan
- Coordinates: 36.2203°N 138.4879°E
- Elevation: 685.9 meters
- Operator: JR East
- Line: ■ Koumi Line
- Distance: 64.1 km from Kobuchizawa
- Platforms: 1 side platform

Other information
- Status: Unstaffed
- Website: Official website

History
- Opened: 1 May 1952

Passengers
- FY2011: 22

Services
Preceding station	JR East	Following station
Nakagomi towards Komoro	Koumi Line	Tatsuokajō towards Kobuchizawa
Location
- Location within Nagano Prefecture Location within Japan

Ōtabe Station (太田部駅, Ōtabe-eki) is a train station in the city of Saku, Nagano, Japan, operated by East Japan Railway Company (JR East).

== Lines ==
Ōtabe Station is served by the Koumi Line and is 64.1 kilometers from the terminus of the line at Kobuchizawa Station.

== Station layout ==
The station consists of one ground-level side platform serving a single bi-directional track. The station is unattended.

== History ==
Ōtabe Station opened on 1 May 1952. With the dissolution and privatization of JNR on April 1, 1987, the station came under the control of the East Japan Railway Company (JR East).

== Surrounding area ==
- Chikuma River

== See also ==
- List of railway stations in Japan
