= Saku, Nagano (town) =

Former town in Japan

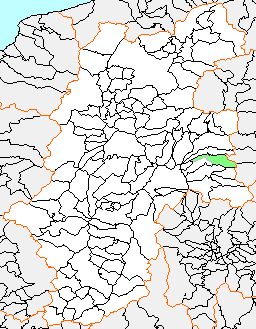
Location of Saku in Nagano Prefecture

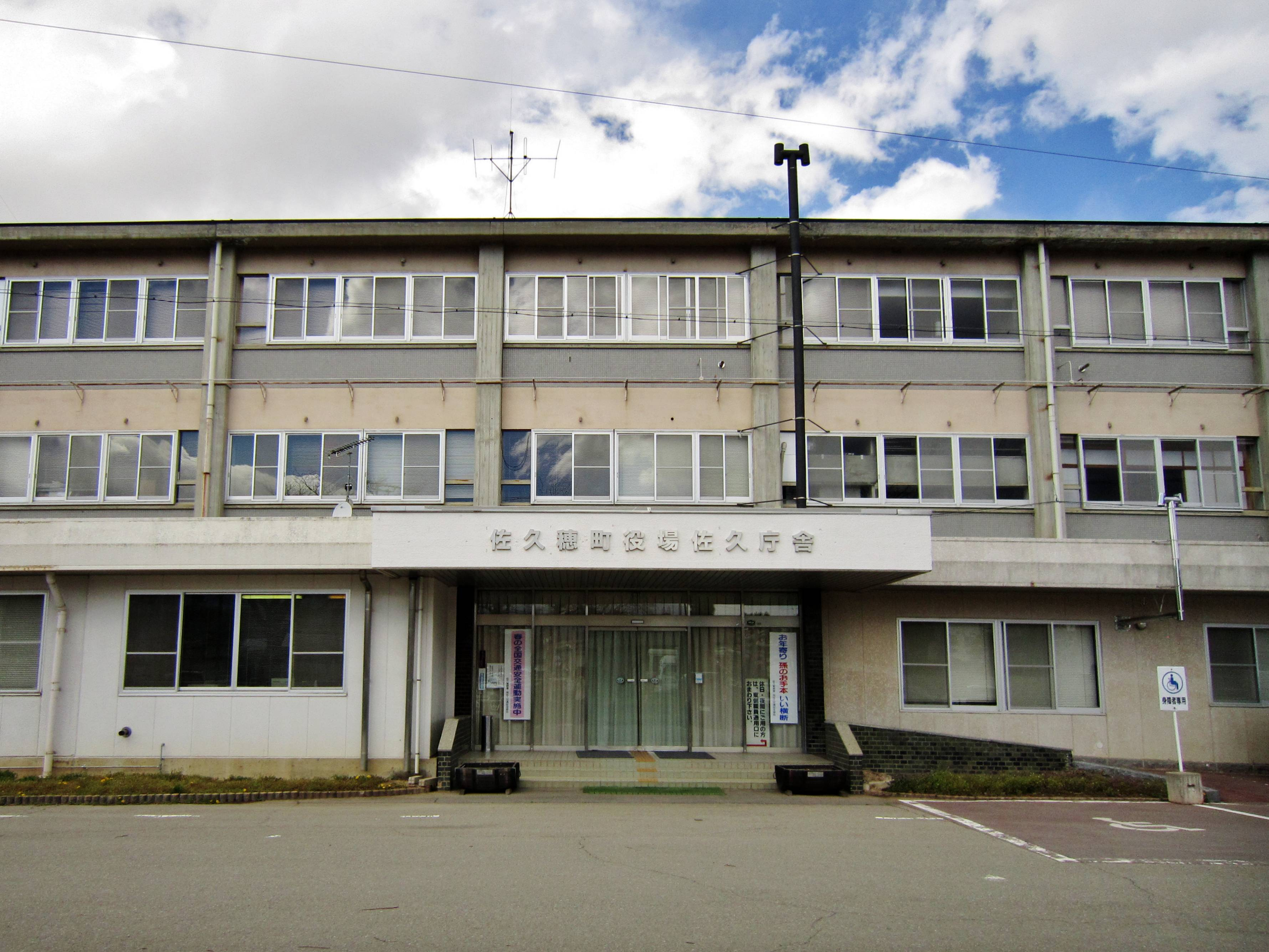
Saku branch office of Sakuho Town

Saku (佐久町, Saku-machi) was a Japanese town in Minamisaku District Nagano Prefecture.

== Population ==
As of January 1, 2004, the town had an estimated population of 8,663. The total area was 122.11 km^{2}.

== History ==
On March 20, 2005, Saku, along with the village of Yachiho (also from Minamisaku District), was merged to create the town of Sakuho.
