= Yachiho =

Dissolved municipality in Nagano prefecture, Japan

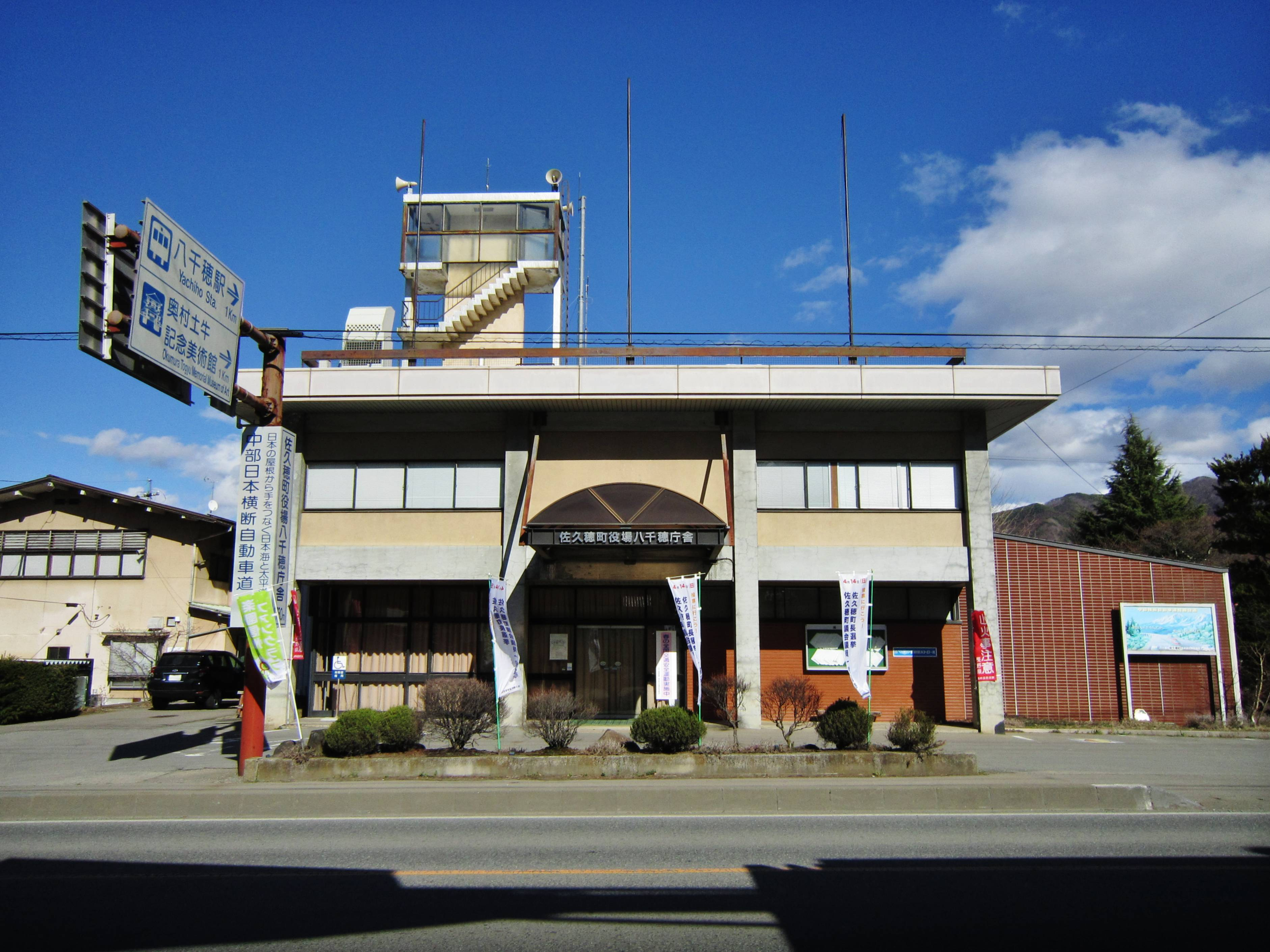
former Yachiho village hall

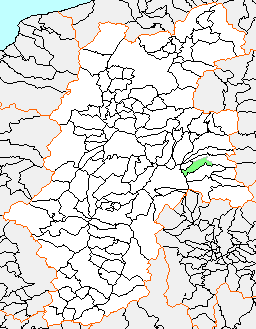
Location of Yachiho in Nagano Prefecture

Yachiho (八千穂村, Yachiho-mura) was a village located in Minamisaku District, Nagano Prefecture, Japan.

On March 20, 2005, Yachiho, along with the town of Saku (also from Minamisaku District), was merged to create the town of Sakuho.
