= Tatsuokajō Station =

Railway station in Saku, Nagano Prefecture, Japan

Tatsuokajō Station 龍岡城駅
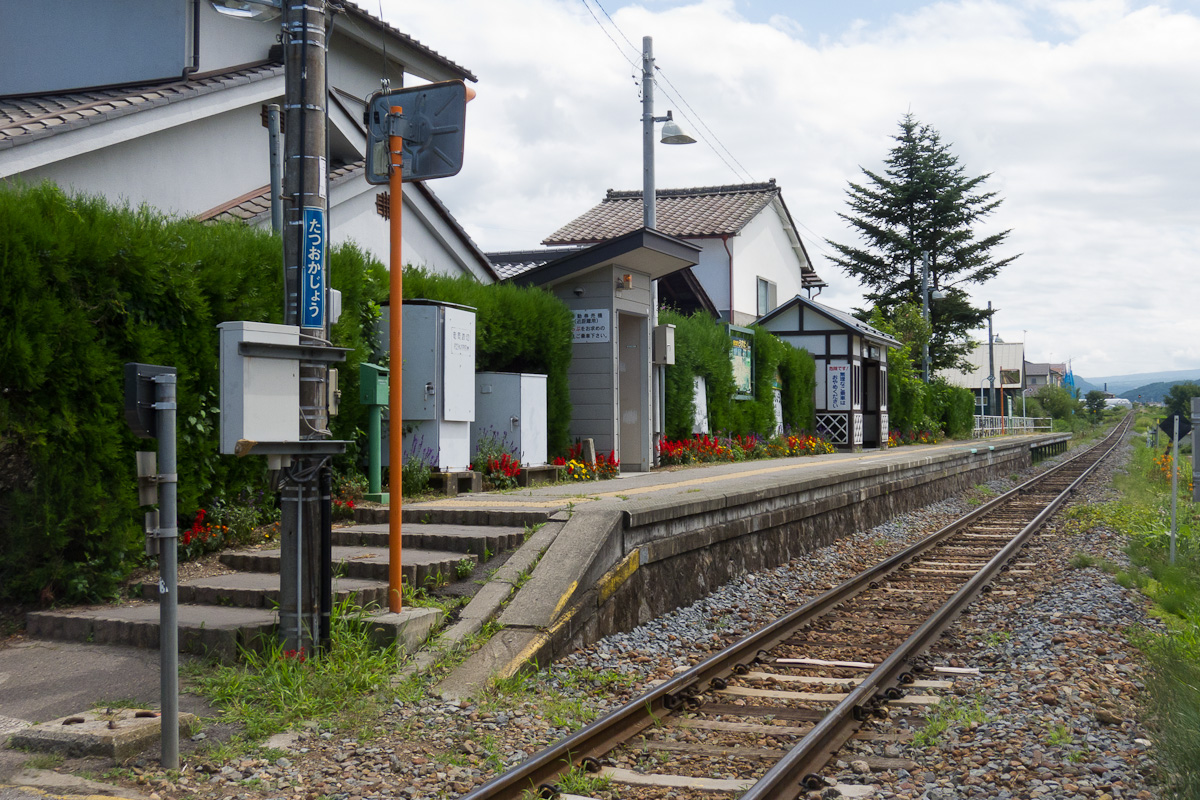
- Tatsuokajō Station, August 2011

General information
- Location: 4917 Taguchi-Kiriai Nagatoro, Saku-shi, Nagano-ken 384-0412; Japan
- Coordinates: 36.2044°N 138.4906°E
- Elevation: 700.1 meters
- Operator: JR East
- Line: ■ Koumi Line
- Distance: 62.1 km from Kobuchizawa
- Platforms: 1 side platform

Other information
- Status: Unstaffed
- Website: Official website

History
- Opened: 8 December 1915
- Former names: Onara (to 1952)

Passengers
- FY2011: 162

Services
Preceding station	JR East	Following station
Ōtabe towards Komoro	Koumi Line	Usuda towards Kobuchizawa
Location
- Location within Nagano Prefecture Location within Japan

Tatsuokajō Station (龍岡城駅, Tatsuokajō-eki) is a train station in the city of Saku, Nagano, Japan, operated by East Japan Railway Company (JR East).

== Lines ==
Tatsuokajō Station is served by the Koumi Line and is 62.1 kilometers from the terminus of the line at Kobuchizawa Station.

== Station layout ==
The station consists of one ground-level side platform serving a single bi-directional track. The station is unattended.

== History ==
Tatsuokajō Station opened on 8 August 1915 as Onara Stop (大奈良停留場). It was elevated to a full passenger station on 1 September 1934. The station was closed from 1944 to 1952. It was renamed to its present name on its reopening on 1 March 1952. With the dissolution and privatization of JNR on April 1, 1987, the station came under the control of the East Japan Railway Company (JR East).

== Surrounding area ==
- Tatsuoka Castle, a nearby star fort.

== See also ==
- List of railway stations in Japan
