= Usuda Station =

Railway station in Saku, Nagano Prefecture, Japan

Usuda Station 臼田駅
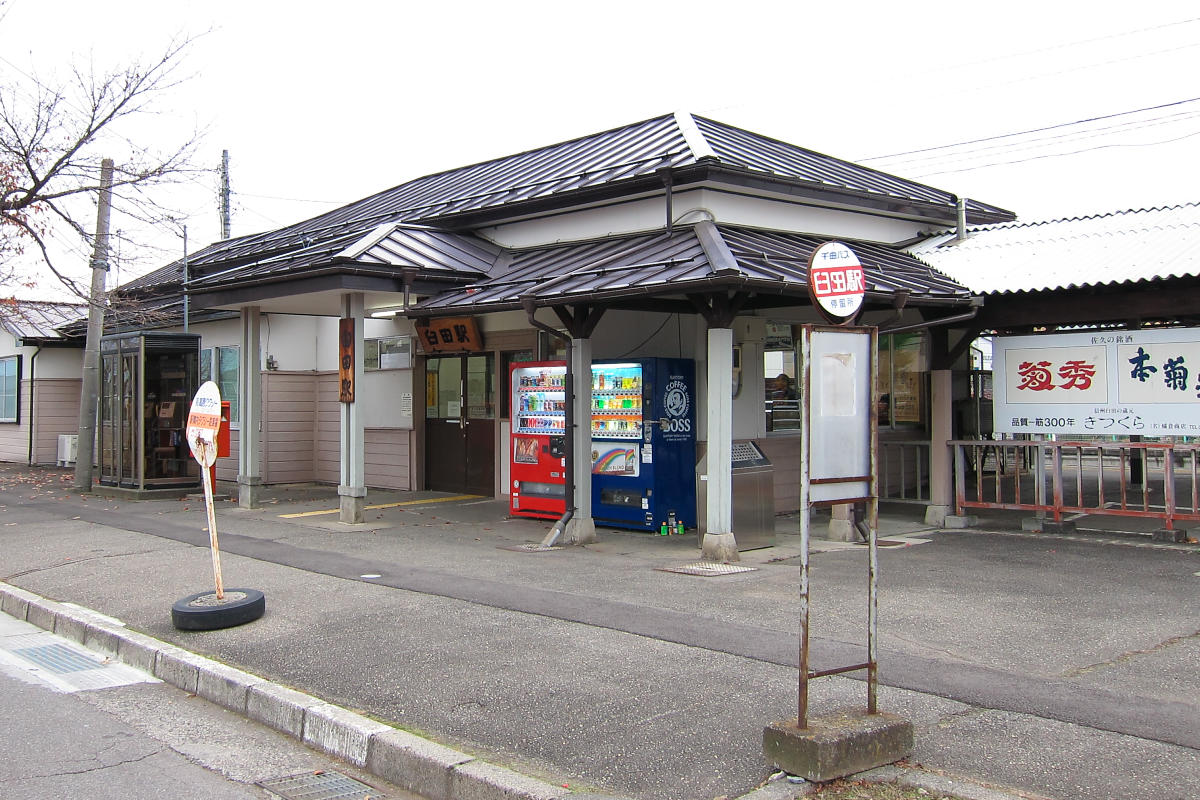
- Usuda Station, November 2009

General information
- Location: 157-2 Shimogoe, Saku-shi, Nagano-ken 384-0414; Japan
- Coordinates: 36.1939°N 138.4885°E
- Elevation: 709.6 meters
- Operator: JR East
- Line: ■ Koumi Line
- Distance: 60.9 km from Kobuchizawa
- Platforms: 2 side platforms

Other information
- Status: Staffed (Midori no Madoguchi)
- Website: Official website

History
- Opened: 28 December 1915
- Former names: Santanda Station (to 1963)

Passengers
- FY2015: 235

Services
Preceding station	JR East	Following station
Tatsuokajō towards Komoro	Koumi Line	Aonuma towards Kobuchizawa
Location
- Location within Nagano Prefecture Location within Japan

Usuda Station (臼田駅, Usuda-eki) is a train station in the city of Saku, Nagano, Japan, operated by East Japan Railway Company (JR East).

== Lines ==
Usuda Station is served by the Koumi Line and is 60.9 kilometers from the terminus of the line at Kobuchizawa Station.

== Station layout ==
The station consists of two ground-level side platforms connected by a level crossing. The station has a Midori no Madoguchi staffed ticket office.

=== Platforms ===
station side	■ Koumi Line	for Koumi and Kobuchizawa
opposite side	■ Koumi Line	for Nakagomi and Komoro

== History ==
Usuda Station opened on 28 December 1915 as the Sandanda Station (三反田駅). It was renamed Santanda Station on 1 September 1934, and renamed to its present name on 1 October 1963. With the dissolution and privatization of JNR on April 1, 1987, the station came under the control of the East Japan Railway Company (JR East).

== Passenger statistics ==
In fiscal year 2015, the station was used by an average of 235 passengers daily (boarding passengers only).

== Surrounding area ==
- former Usuda Town Hall
- Usuda Middle School

== See also ==
- List of railway stations in Japan
