= Usuda Deep Space Center =

Communications facility of JAXA

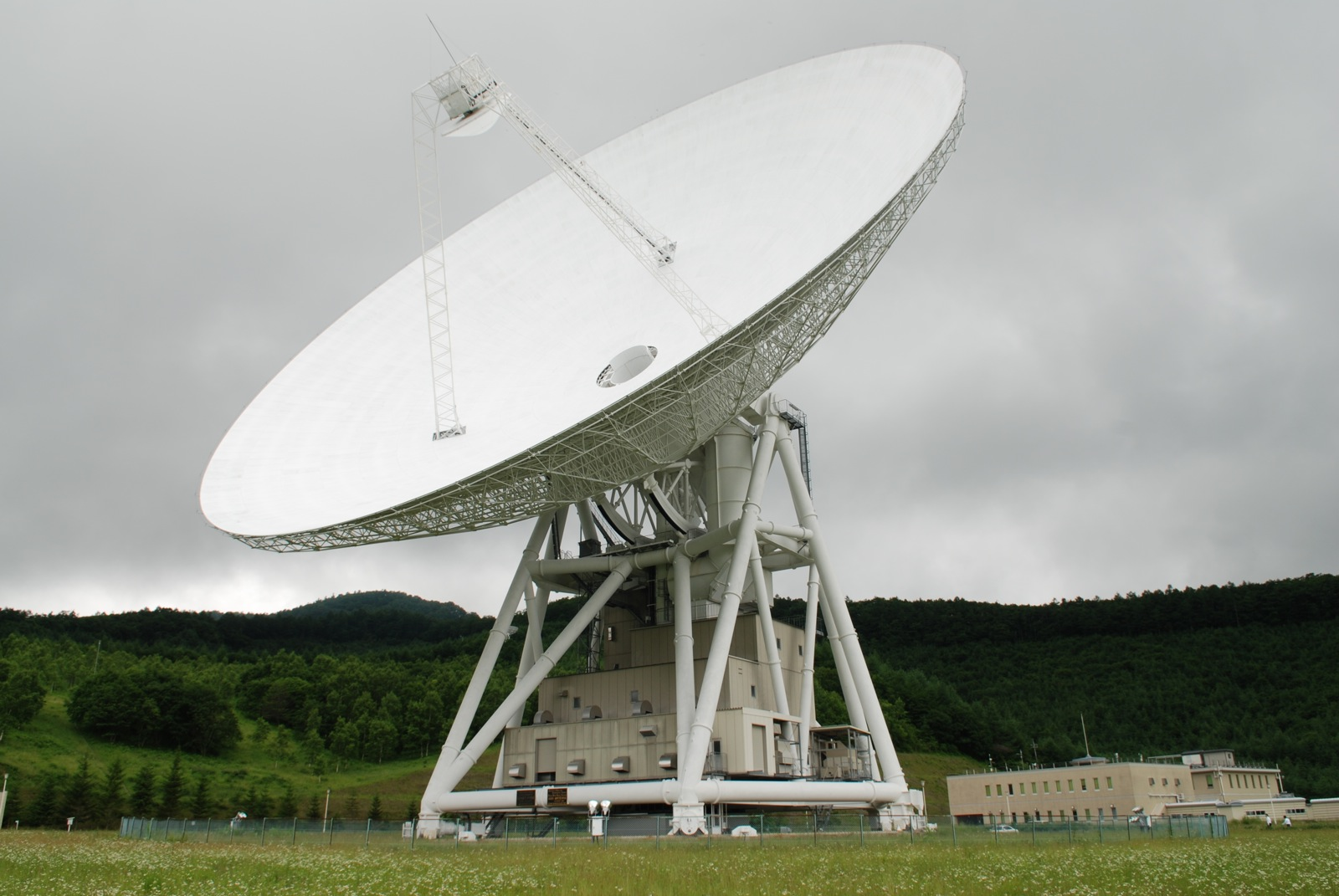
- The 64 meter antenna at the Usuda Deep Space Complex
- Alternative names: UDSC
- Location: Saku, Japan
- Coordinates: 36°07′59″N 138°21′44″E
- Altitude: 1,456 m (4,777 ft)
- Website: https://www.isas.jaxa.jp/about/facilities/usuda.html
- Related media on Commons

Usuda Deep Space Center (Japanese: 臼田宇宙空間観測所, Hepburn: Usuda Uchū Kūkan Kansokujo; Usuda DSC, UDSC) is a facility of the Japan Aerospace Exploration Agency. It is a spacecraft tracking station in Saku, Nagano (formerly in Usuda, Nagano; Usuda merged into Saku in 2005), opened in October, 1984. The main features of the station are two large beam waveguide antennas, an older 64 meter antenna and a newer 54 meter dish.

Usuda was the first deep-space antenna constructed with beam-waveguide technology. Although this construction dramatically simplifies installation and maintenance of electronics, it was previously thought to offer poor noise performance. However, after the U.S. Jet Propulsion Lab (JPL) tested this antenna and found the noise performance was better than its conventional 64-meter antennas, it too switched to this method of construction for all subsequent antennas of their Deep Space Network (DSN). Because the 64 meter antenna is aging and is still in use over ten years after its designed service life, JAXA has built a new antenna nearby, the 54 meter dish of Misasa Deep Space Station.

Similar huge antennas are used by the deep space networks of the USA, China, Russia, Europe, and India.

== Misasa Deep Space Station ==
Misasa Deep Space Station (MDSS) is now the world's most sensitive antenna for Ka-band communication worldwide. It is located 1.3 km from Usuda and is also administrated and maintained by the Usuda Deep Space Center.

This new antenna had the name GREAT (Ground Station for Deep Space Exploration and Telecommunication) during the construction. It is 54 meters in diameter and has an adaptive surface with high accuracy and efficiency, and hence is capable of working at the higher Ka-band frequencies. This will increase the potential data throughput despite the smaller size.

== Public Access Classification ==
- General public: Observation of exterior installation and access to exhibition room
- Special access: None specified. (An explanation of the UDSC communications are conducted during special public access events conducted by Sagamihara Campus).
- Research Utilization: National Cooperative Research Institute, National University Cooperative Research Institute, International Cooperative Research Institute (access via the Space Sciences Research Institute)
