= Saku University =

University in Nagano Prefecture, Japan

- 佐久大学
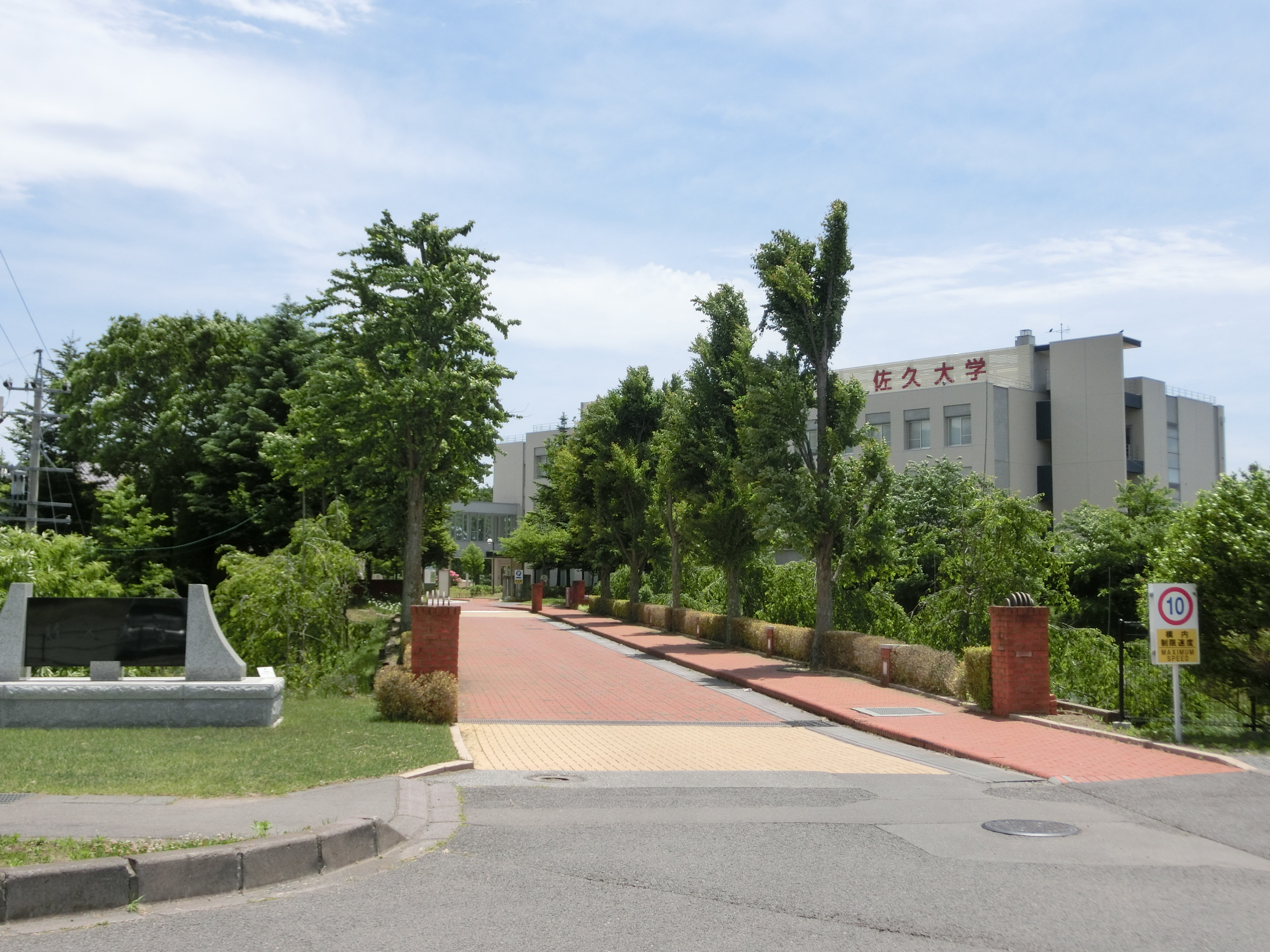
- Saku University
- Motto: 自律 創造 友愛
- Motto in English: Autonomy, Creativity and Friendship
- Type: Private
- Established: 2008
- Affiliation: Saku Educational Institute
- President: Fuki Horiuchi
- Academic staff: 99
- Administrative staff: 13
- Students: 380
- Undergraduates: 370
- Postgraduates: 10
- Location: Saku, Nagano, 385-0022, Japan; 36°15′57.5″N 138°27′47.2″E
- Language: Japanese
- Website: www.saku.ac.jp (in Japanese)

Saku University (佐久大学, Saku daigaku) is a private university in the city of Saku, Nagano, Japan. It was established in 2008.
