= Saku District, Shinano =

Former district in Nagano prefecture, Japan

Coordinates: 36°17′06″N 138°27′21″E

Saku (佐久郡, -gun) was a district located in Shinano Province (now Nagano Prefecture).

== History ==
The former Gunga(ancient district office) (郡衙) is estimated to be located at Nagatoro in the city of Saku.

Due to land reforms, Saku District split into Minamisaku (南佐久郡) and Kitasaku (北佐久郡) Districts on January 14, 1879.

== Pesticide problems ==
Cases of dermatitis caused by pesticide exposures, tabulated by the Division of Dermatology, Saku Central Hospital, Japan, from 1975 to 2000 are described. Dermatitis cases gradually decreased from 1975 to 2000, presumably accelerated by the phase-out of dermatitis-causing pesticides, including difolatan fungicide and salithion, an organophosphate insecticide. Cases of chronic and solar dermatitis gradually decreased, which may be explained by reductions in the use of allergenic or photosensitive sulfur agents and organophosphates. However, the ratios of chemical burns from irritant pesticides—calcium polysulfide, dazomet, methyl bromide, chlorpicrin, paraquat/diquat, organophosphorus, quintozene, and glyphosate—rose in those years. Chemical burns from calcium polysulfide were responsible for most of the severe cases.
