= Kitasaku District, Nagano =

District in Nagano Prefecture, Japan

Coordinates: 36.353°N 138.552°E

Kitasaku (北佐久郡, Kitasaku-gun) is a district located in Nagano Prefecture, Japan.

As of 2023, the district has an estimated population of 41,894 with a density of 149 persons per km^{2}. The total area is 281.69 km^{2}.

== Municipalities ==
The district consists of three towns:

- Karuizawa (Note: Classified as a town.)
- Miyota
- Tateshina

== History ==
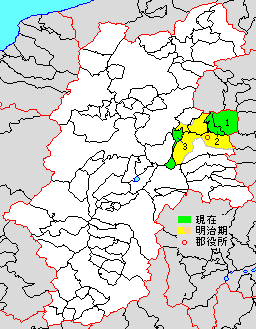
Map showing original extent of Kitasaku District in Nagano Prefecture: * yellow - areas formerly within the district borders during the early Meiji period: 1. Karuizawa-machi; 2. Miyota-machi; 3. Tateshina-machi

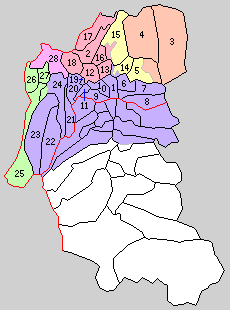
Colored areas are in this district.

=== Recent mergers ===
- On April 1, 2004 - The village of Kitamimaki was merged with the town of Tōbu (from Chiisagata District) to form the new city of Tōmi.
- On April 1, 2005 - The town of Mochizuki and the village of Asashina were merged with the town of Usuda (from Minamisaku District) and the old city of Saku to form the new city of Saku.
