= Saku, Nagano =

Saku 佐久市
- City
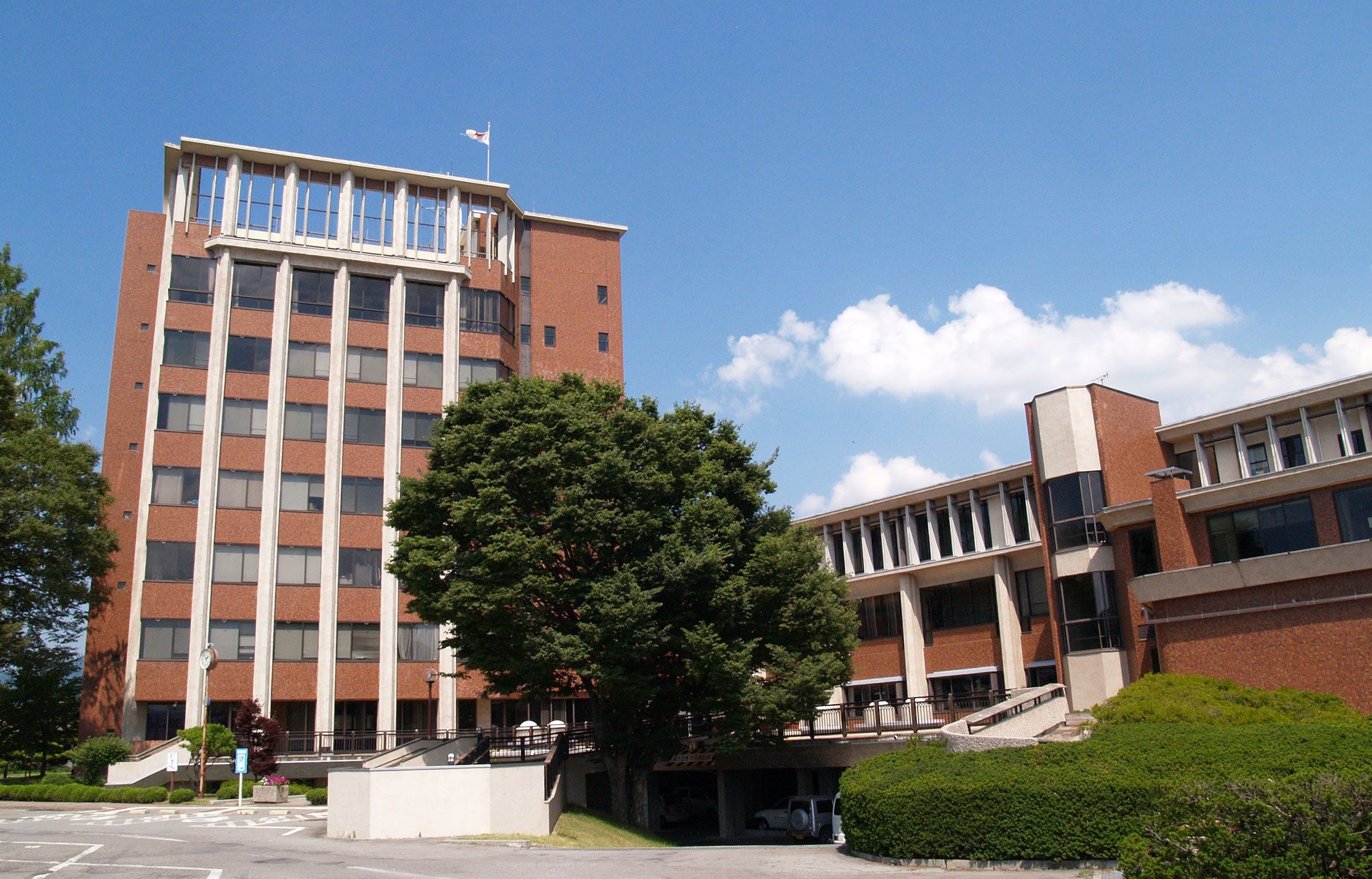
- Saku City Hall

- Flag Seal

- Location of Saku in Nagano Prefecture

- Coordinates: 36°14′55.7″N 138°28′37″E
- Country: Japan
- Region: Chūbu (Kōshin'etsu)
- Prefecture: Nagano

Government
  - Mayor: Seiji Yanagida

Area
  - Total: 423.51 km^{2} (163.52 sq mi)

Population (July 1, 2023)
  - Total: 97,454
  - Density: 230.11/km^{2} (595.98/sq mi)
- Time zone: UTC+9 (Japan Standard Time)
- Phone number: 0268-62-1111
- Address: 3056, Nakagomi, Saku-shi, Nagano-ken 385-8501
- Climate: Cwa/Dwa
- Website: Official website
- Symbols
- Fish: Carp
- Flower: Cosmos
- Tree: Larix kaempferi

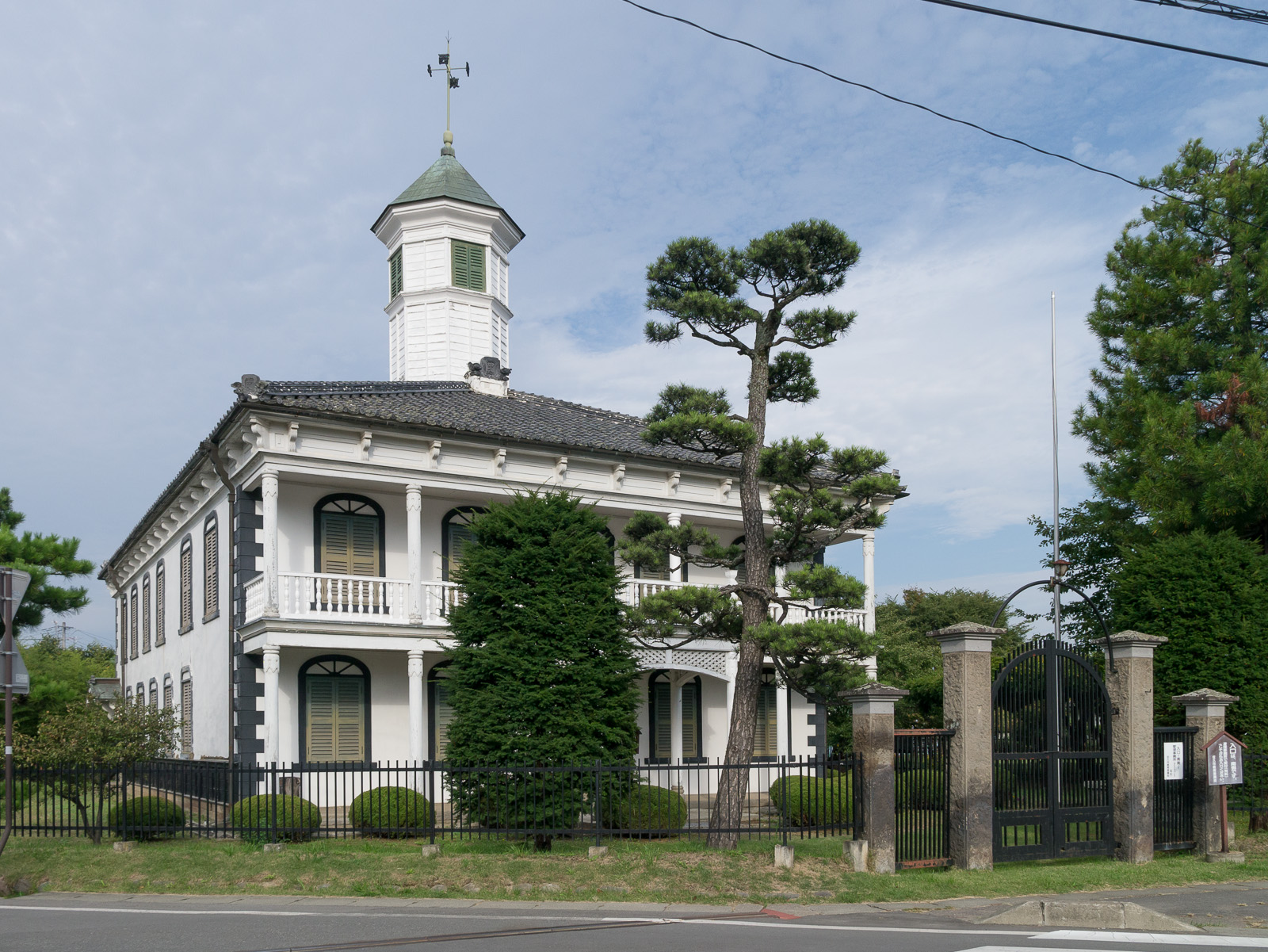
Former Nakagomi school

Saku (佐久市, Saku-shi) is a city located in Nagano Prefecture, Japan. As of 1 July 2023, the city had an estimated population of 97,454 in 41,522 households, and a population density of 230 persons per km². The total area of the city is 423.51 square kilometres (163.52 sq mi).

== Geography ==
Saku is located in east-central Nagano Prefecture in the Saku Basin of the upper reaches of the Shinano River. The city claims the distinction of containing the point furthest from the sea within Honshu island (actually this point lies within the former town of Usuda). Since the opening of Sakudaira Station on the Nagano Shinkansen, many people commute to Tokyo, which is one hour away.

=== Surrounding municipalities ===
- Gunma Prefecture
  - Kanra District: Shimonita, Nanmoku
- Nagano Prefecture
  - Komoro, Chino, Tōmi
  - Minamisaku District: Sakuho
  - Kitasaku District: Karuizawa, Miyota, Tateshina

== Climate ==
The city has a climate characterized by hot and humid summers, and relatively mild winters (Köppen climate classification Dwa). The average annual temperature in Saku is 10.9 °C (51.6 °F). The average annual rainfall is 964.0 mm (37.95 in) with September as the wettest month. The temperatures are highest on average in August, at around 23.7 °C (74.7 °F), and lowest in January, at around −1.6 °C (29.1 °F).

Climate data for Saku (1991–2020 normals, extremes 1978–present)
Month	Jan	Feb	Mar	Apr	May	Jun	Jul	Aug	Sep	Oct	Nov	Dec	Year
Record high °C (°F)	17.4 (63.3)	21.6 (70.9)	27.6 (81.7)	30.4 (86.7)	33.0 (91.4)	37.1 (98.8)	37.5 (99.5)	37.0 (98.6)	36.3 (97.3)	30.6 (87.1)	26.3 (79.3)	22.7 (72.9)	37.5 (99.5)
Mean daily maximum °C (°F)	4.4 (39.9)	5.7 (42.3)	10.2 (50.4)	16.8 (62.2)	22.2 (72.0)	25.1 (77.2)	29.1 (84.4)	30.1 (86.2)	25.1 (77.2)	18.9 (66.0)	13.4 (56.1)	7.4 (45.3)	17.4 (63.3)
Daily mean °C (°F)	−1.6 (29.1)	−0.6 (30.9)	3.4 (38.1)	9.5 (49.1)	15.1 (59.2)	19.0 (66.2)	22.9 (73.2)	23.7 (74.7)	19.3 (66.7)	12.8 (55.0)	6.5 (43.7)	1.1 (34.0)	10.9 (51.6)
Mean daily minimum °C (°F)	−7.2 (19.0)	−6.4 (20.5)	−2.7 (27.1)	2.7 (36.9)	8.7 (47.7)	14.2 (57.6)	18.5 (65.3)	19.1 (66.4)	14.9 (58.8)	8.0 (46.4)	0.8 (33.4)	−4.4 (24.1)	5.5 (41.9)
Record low °C (°F)	−16.9 (1.6)	−18.3 (−0.9)	−13.4 (7.9)	−9.1 (15.6)	−1.4 (29.5)	3.7 (38.7)	8.8 (47.8)	10.5 (50.9)	3.4 (38.1)	−3.3 (26.1)	−8.1 (17.4)	−14.4 (6.1)	−18.3 (−0.9)
Average precipitation mm (inches)	25.6 (1.01)	28.5 (1.12)	52.4 (2.06)	58.9 (2.32)	84.7 (3.33)	119.1 (4.69)	143.3 (5.64)	106.4 (4.19)	153.6 (6.05)	129.3 (5.09)	40.8 (1.61)	21.5 (0.85)	964.0 (37.95)
Average precipitation days (≥ 1.0 mm)	4.4	4.6	7.6	8.2	9.4	11.6	13.7	9.5	10.1	8.4	5.8	4.4	97.7
Mean monthly sunshine hours	188.7	178.3	194.7	202.6	213.7	159.2	168.3	197.0	144.0	148.2	169.3	182.8	2,146.9
Source: Japan Meteorological Agency (1991–2020 normals, extremes 1978–present)

== History ==
Saku is located in former Shinano Province, and by the Sengoku period it was home to the Ochiai clan, a samurai family that sided with Uesugi Kenshin during his conflict with Takeda Shingen in the 1550s. The Ochiai clan consequently fought for the Uesugi during the Siege of Katsurayama in March 1557; all Ochiai members who took part in the battle were killed in combat or committed suicide. During the Edo period the area of Saku developed as the castle town of Tatsuoka Domain under the Tokugawa shogunate and as a post town. Following the post-Meiji restoration cadastral reforms, the area was organised into Saku District, with the town of Asama, and the village of Higashi (from Kitasaku District) merging with the towns of Nozawa and Nakagomi (both from Minamisaku District) to create the city of Saku. On April 1, 2005 Saku absorbed the town of Usuda (from Minamisaku District), the town of Mochizuki, and the village of Asashina (both from Kitasaku District).

=== Former town of Asama area in Kitasaku District ===
- c. 1875 The villages of Iwao, Ochiai, and Owada from Saku District merged to form the village of Naruse.
- May 1876 The villages of Akaiwa, Kamitsukabara, Shimotsukabara, Neneitsukabara, and Nakachi from Saku District merged to form the village of Tsukabara, and the village of Ichi from the same district merged with the village of Ichimurashinden to form the village of Ichida.
- c. 1879 Kitasaku District Government enforced. The villages of Iwamurada, Nagatoro, Sarukubo, Tsukabara, Nenei, Hiratsuka, Ichida, Naruse, Imai, Yokowa, Mikawada, Kamihirao, Shimohirao, and Yokone belongs to Kitasaku District.
- April 1, 1889 The city, town, and village status enforced.
  - The town of Iwamurada in Kitasaku District absorbed the villages of Nagatoro and Sarukubo to gain town status.
  - The village of Tsukabara, Nenei, Hiratsuka, and Ichida from Kitasaku District merged to form the village of Nakasato.
  - The village of Naruse, Imai, Yokowa, and Mikawada from Kitasaku District merged to form the village of Takase.
  - The village of Kamihirao, Shimohirao, and Yokone from Kitasaku District merged to form the village of Hirane.
- December 20, 1954 The town of Iwamurada and the villages of Nakasato, Takase, and Hirane merged to form the town of Asama in Kitasaku District.

=== Former village of Higashi area in Kitasaku District ===
- August 1876 The village of Kosaka absorbed the village of Kosakashinden.
- 1879 Kitasaku District Government enforced. The villages of Kosaka, Arakoda, Yasuhara, and Shiga belongs to Kitasaku District.
- April 1, 1889 The city, town, and village status enforced.
  - The village of Kosaka, Arakoda, and Yasuhara from Kitasaku District merged to form the village of Mitsui.
  - The village of Shiga formed without merging.
- February 1, 1955 The village of Shiga and Mitsui merged to form the village of Higashi.

=== Former town of Nozawa area in Minamisaku District ===
- December 1874 The village of Maeyama in Saku District absorbes the village of Maeyamashinden, Shimo, and Naka.
- c. 1875 The village of Kamisakurai, Nakasakurai, Shimosakurai, and Sakuraishinden merged to form the village of Sakurai.
- May 1876 The villages of Takeda, Nukao, Kutsuzawa, and Hirai merged to form the village of Negishi, and the villages of Shimogata, Shimogatashinden, Shimohira, Imaoka, and Aihama merged to form the village of Tomono. In June, the village of Osawa absorbed the village of Osawashinden.
- c. 1879 Minamisaku District Government enforced. The villages of Nozawa, Hara, Toridemachi, Takayanagi, Honshinmachi, Atobe, Michizuka, Negishi, Tomono, Maeyama, Komiyama, Sakurai, and Osawa belongs to Minamisaku District.
- April 1, 1889 The city, town, and village status enforced.
  - The village of Nozawa in Minamisaku District was formed by absorbing the villages of Hara, Toridemachi, Takayanagi, Kajiya, Honshinmachi, Atobe, and Michizuka.
  - The villages of Negishi and Tomono merged to form the village of Kishino.
  - The village of Maeyama was formed by absorbing the village of Komiyama.
  - The village of Sakurai was formed without merging.
  - The village of Osawa was formed without merging.
- March 9, 1897 The village of Nozawa gained town status.
- April 1, 1954 The town of Nozawa in Minamisaku District absorbed the villages of Osawa, Kishino, Sakurai, and Maeyama.

=== Former town of Nakagomi area in Minamisaku District ===
- August 2, 1876 The village of Hiraka in Saku District absorbed the village of Hirakashinmachi. The villages of Yamada, Kitazawa, and Kiyokawa merged to form the village of Tokiwa.
- c. 1879 Minamisaku District Government enforced. The villages of Shimonakagomi, Seto, Hiraka, Otabe, Tokiwa, and Uchiyama belongs to Minamisaku District.
- April 1, 1889 The city, town, and village status enforced.
  - The villages of Shimonakagomi and Seto merged to form the village of Nakaze.
  - The villages of Hiraka and Otabe merged into the village of Tokiwa. (※The former village of Kiyokawa in the village of Tokiwa was merged into the village of Taguchi (later merged with the village of Aonuma to form the village of Taguchiaonuma→merged into the village of Usuda. Now part of the city of Saku))
  - The village of Uchiyama was formed without merging.
- April 1, 1899 The village of Hiraka absorbed the former village of Seto areas from the village of Nakaze. On July 18, the village of Nakaze renamed to the village of Nakagomi.
- November 1, 1919 The village of Nakagomi gained town status.
- August 1, 1956 The town of Nakagomi in Minamisaku District absorbed the villages of Hiraka and Uchiyama.

=== Former village of Asashina area in Kitasaku District ===
- May 30, 1876 The village of Shionada absorbed the village of Ichizaemonshinden in Saku District.
- c. 1879 Kitasaku District government enforced. The villages of Shionada, Mimayose, Gorobēshinden, Yawata, Yomogita, Kuwayama, and Yashima belongs to Kitasaku District.
- April 1, 1889 The city, town, and village status enforced.
  - The villages of Shionada and Mimayose merged to form the village of Nakatsu.
  - The villages of Yawata, Yomogita, Kuwayama and Yashima merged to form the village of Minamimimaki.
- January 15, 1955 The villages of Nakatsu, Gorobēshinden and Minamimimaki merged to form the village of Asashina.

=== Former town of Mochizuki area in Kitasaku District ===
- c. 1875 The town of Mochizukishinden merged into the town of Mochizuki in Saku District. The village of Kannonjishinden merged into the village of Motai. The villages of Irikatakura, Iwashita, and Kasugashinmachi merged into the village of Kasuga. The village of Makifuse, Irifuse, Shikibu, Nukui, Nakai, Kutsuzawashinden, and Maeyamasanshinden merged to form the village of Fuse.
- c. 1876 The village of Katakura, Hidai, Tenjinbayashi, Oyachishinden, Kodaira, Mitsui, and Koro merged to form the village of Kyowa.
- c. 1879 Kitasaku District government enforced. The town of Mochizuki and the villages of Innai, Motai, Kasuga, Fuse, and Kyowa belongs to Kitasaku District.
- April 1, 1889 The city, town, and village status enforced.
  - The town of Mochizuki and the villages of Innai and Motai merged to form the village of Motomaki.
  - The village of Kasuga was formed without merging.
  - The village of Fuse was founded without merging.
  - The village of Kyowa was founded without merging.
- April 1, 1954 The village of Motomaki gained town status.
- April 1, 1959 The town of Motomaki and the villages of Kasuga, Fuse, and Kyowa merged to reform the town of Mochizuki.

(※The town of Mochizuki was once dissolved since March 31, 1889)

- April 15, 1960 Motai area from the former town of Motomaki broke off and went to the town of Tateshina.

=== Former town of Usuda area in Minamisaku District ===
- c. 1875 The village of Yuhara absorbed the village of Yuharashinden in Saku District.
- August 2, 1876 The villages of Tanokuchi and Kaminakagomi merged into the village of Taguchi.
- c. 1879 Minamisaku District government enforced. The villages of Usuda, Shimootagiri, Katsuma, Kamiotagiri, Nakaotagiri, Nakaotagirishinden, Yuhara, Mibun, Shimogoe, Taguchi, Irisawa and Hirabayashi belongs to Minamisaku District.
- April 1, 1889 The city, town, and village status enforced.
  - The village of Usuda absorbed the villages of Shimootagiri and Katsuma.
  - The villages of Kamiotagiri, Nakaotagiri, Nakaotagirishinden and Yuhara merged to form the village of Kirihara.
  - The village of Taguchi absorbed the villages of Mibun and Shimogoe, and the former village of Kiyokawa in the village of Tokiwa.
  - The villages of Irisawa and Hirabayashi merged to form the village of Aonuma
- June 30, 1951 The village of Usuda gained town status.
- August 1, 1955 The town of Usuda absorbed the village of Kirihara.
- September 30, 1956 The villages of Taguchi and Aonuma merged to form the village of Taguchiaonuma.
- April 1, 1957 The town of Usuda absorbed the village of Taguchiaonuma.
- April 1, 1959 Sohara, Haguroshita and Hirabayashi area from the former village of Taguchiaonuma broke off and went to the town of Saku.

== Demographics ==
Per Japanese census data, the population of Saku has remained relatively steady over the past 60 years.

Historical population
Year	Pop.	±%
1960	94,732	—
1970	89,029	−6.0%
1980	91,285	+2.5%
1990	95,625	+4.8%
2000	100,016	+4.6%
2010	100,575	+0.6%
2020	98,199	−2.4%

== Government ==
Saku has a mayor-council form of government with a directly elected mayor and a unicameral city legislature of 26 members.

== Economy ==
The economy of Saku is largely agricultural, with rice, and carp fish farming as major components. The manufacturing sector includes electronics.

== Education ==
=== Universities and colleges ===
- Saku University
- Shinshu Junior College

=== Primary and secondary education ===
Saku has 17 public elementary schools and 7 public middle school operated by the city government, and one private middle school. There are five public high school operated by the Nagano Prefectural Board of Education.

== Transportation ==
=== Railway ===
- East Japan Railway Company - Hokuriku Shinkansen
  - Sakudaira
- East Japan Railway Company - Koumi Line
  - Aonuma - Usuda - Tatsuokajō - Ōtabe - Nakagomi - Namezu - Kita-Nakagomi - Iwamurada - Sakudaira - Nakasato

=== Highway ===
- Jōshin-etsu Expressway
- Chūbu-Ōdan Expressway
- National Route 141
- National Route 142
- National Route 254

== External relations ==
- Sister cities
  - - Avallon (Yonne, Burgundy, France, sister city since July 14, 1976
- Friendship cities
  - - Kōzushima, Tokyo, Japan
  - - Saku, (Harju County, Estonia, since May 1, 2007
  - - Yurihonjō, Akita, Japan
  - - Shizuoka, Shizuoka, Japan
  - - Sükhbaatar, Ulaanbaatar, Mongolia, since August 4, 2008

== Notable people from Saku, Nagano ==
- Seishiro Endo, 8th dan ranked Aikikai aikido master teacher
- Miho Nakayama (1970 – 2024, Nihongo: 中山美穂) Japanese actress and singer.
- Buronson, Japanese manga writer, and one of the creators of both Fist of the North Star and Heat (Real Name: Yoshiyuki Okamura, Nihongo: 岡村 善行, Okamura Yoshiyuki/Sho Fumimura, Nihongo: 史村 翔, Fumimura Shō)
- Jiro Okabe, Japanese politician, former member of House of Representatives, Rikken Seiyūkai, Chūseikai and Kenseikai
- Toru Owashi, Japanese professional wrestler (Real Name: Toru Ito, Nihongo: 伊藤 透, Itō Tōru)
- Yusuke Shirai, Japanese voice actor
- Shinji Takahashi, Japanese religious leader, corporate manager and hardware engineer, founder of God Light Association
- Yoshimi Takeuchi, Japanese Sinologist
- Yuichiro Ueno, Japanese long-distance runner, who specializes in the 1500 and 5000 metres events

== Local attractions ==
- Kasuga Onsen
- Former Nakagomi School
- Saku Balloon Festival
- Saku Ski Garden "Parada"
- Shinkai Sansha Shrine
- Tatsuoka Castle Site
- Usuda Star Dome
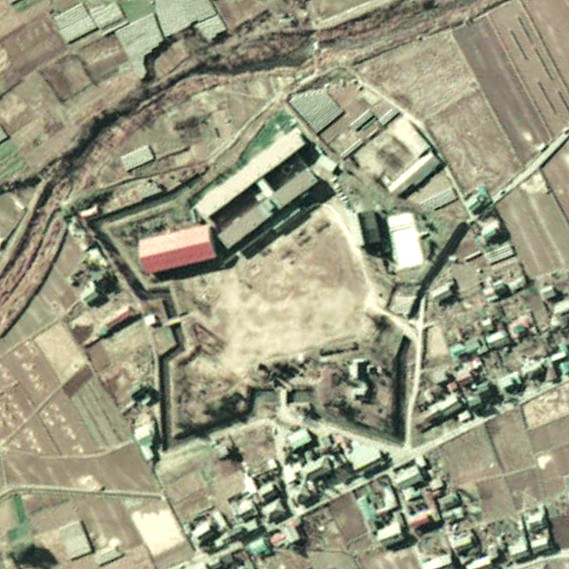
Tatsuoka Castle Site

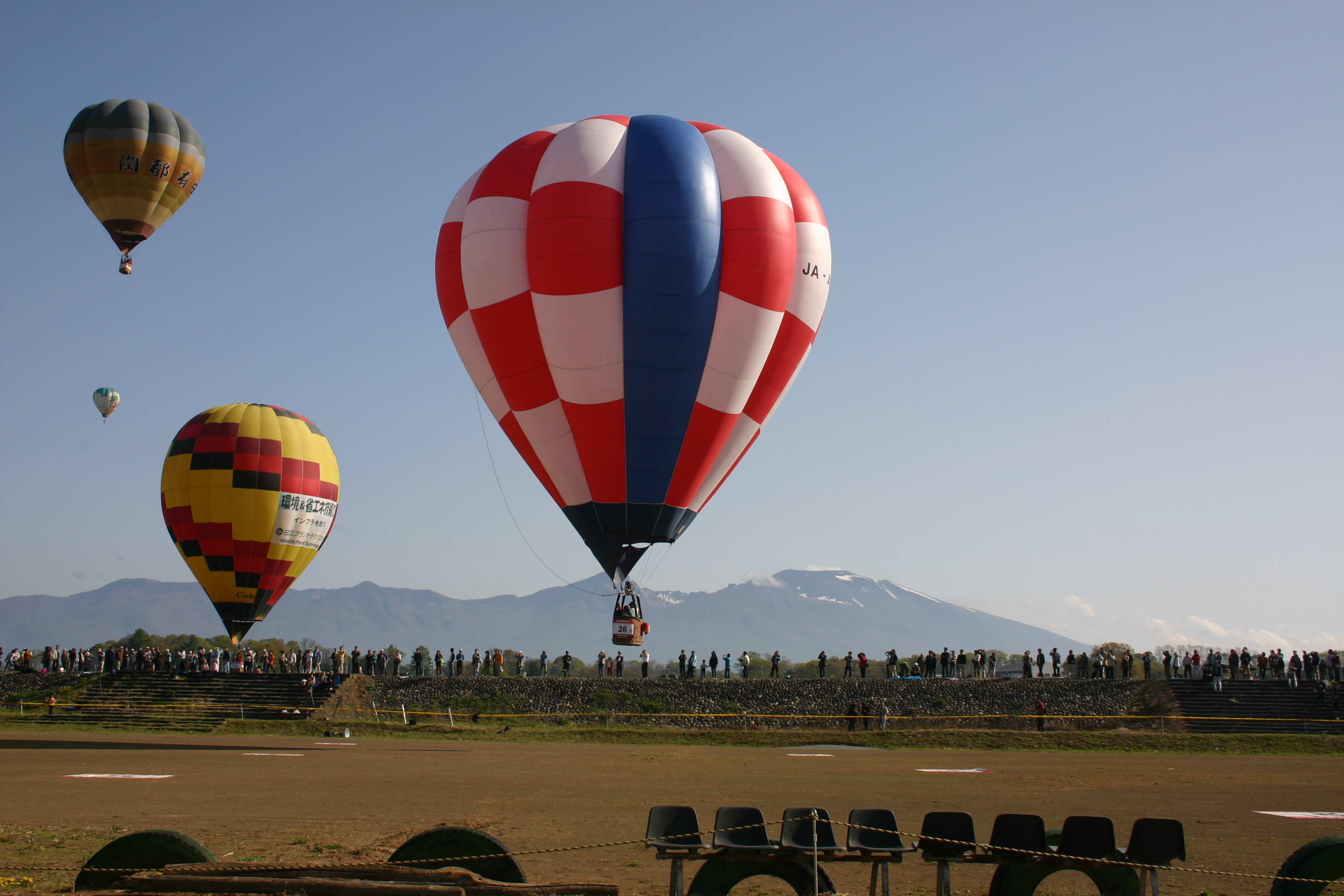
Saku Hot Air Ballon Festival

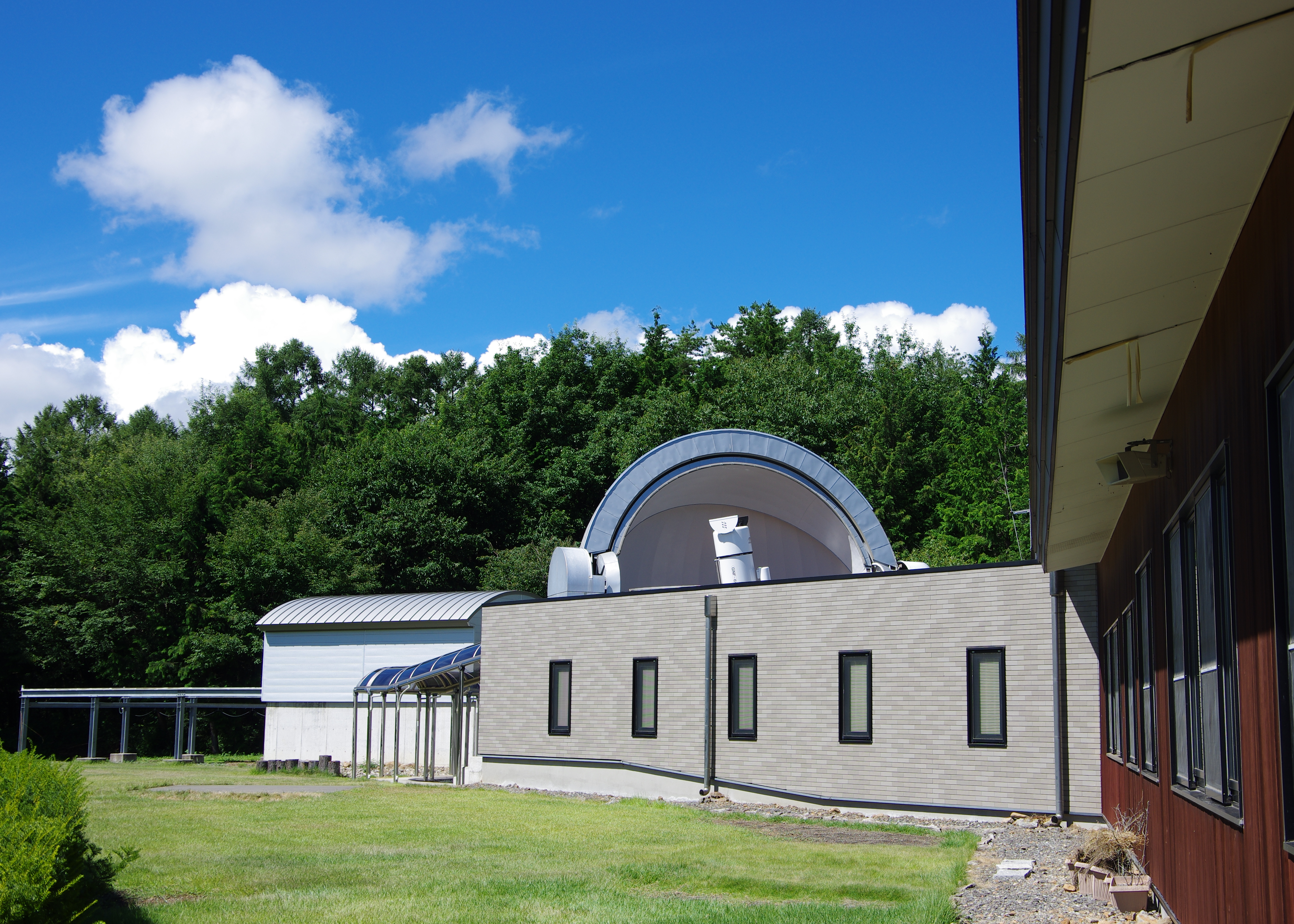
Usuda Star Dome

== Bibliography ==
- Turnbull, Stephen (2008) [1st pub. 2003]. Kawanakajima 1553–64. Samurai power struggle (4th ed.). Oxford: Osprey Publishing. ISBN 978-1-84176-562-4.
