= Minamisaku District, Nagano =

District in Nagano prefecture, Japan

Coordinates: 36.059°N 138.504°E

Minamisaku (南佐久郡, Minamisaku-gun) is a district located in Nagano Prefecture, Japan.

As of 2023, the district has an estimated population of 22,248 with a density of 29 persons per km^{2}. The total area is 767.42 km^{2}.

== Municipalities ==
The district consists of two towns and four villages:

- Kawakami (Note: Classified as a village.)
- Kitaaiki
- Koumi (Note: Classified as a town.)
- Minamiaiki
- Minamimaki
- Sakuho

== History ==
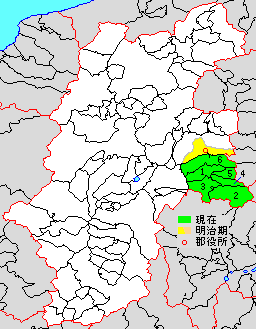
Map showing original extent of Minamisaku District in Nagano Prefecture: * yellow - areas formerly within the district borders during the early Meiji period: 1. Koumi-machi; 2. Kawakami-mura; 3. Minamimaki-mura; 4. Minamiaiki-mura; 5. Kitaaiki-mura; 6. Sakuho-machi

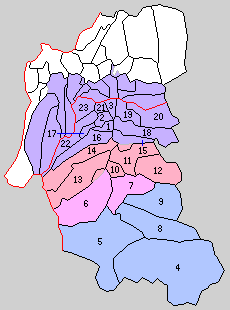
Colored areas are in this district.

=== District Timeline ===
- April 1, 1954 - The municipalities of Nozawa, Sakurai, Kishino, Maeyama, and Osawa merged to form the town of Nozawa.
- February 1, 1955 - The villages of Sakae and Umise merged to form the town of Saku.
- August 1, 1955 - The town of Usuda merged with the village of Kirihara to form the town of Usuda.
- August 1, 1956 - The municipalities of Nakagomi, Hiraga, and Uchimura merged to form the town of Nakagoshi.
- September 30, 1956:
  - The village of Ohyuga merged into the town of Saku.
  - The villages of Taguchi and Aonuma merged to form the village of Taguchiaonuma.
  - The town of Koumi merged with the village of Hokuboku to form the town of Koumi.
- April 1, 1957 - The village of Taguchiaonuma merged with the town of Usuda to form the town of Usuda.
- March 25, 1958 - Parts of the town of Koumi merged into the village of Yachiho.
- April 1, 1959 - Parts of the town of Usuda merged into the town of Saku.
- April 1, 1961 - The towns of Nozawa and Nakagomi merged with the municipalities of Asama and Azuma from Kitasaku District to form the city of Saku.

=== Recent mergers ===
- March 20, 2005 - The town of Saku and the village of Yachiho were merged to form the new town of Sakuho.
- April 1, 2005 - The town of Usuda was merged with the town of Mochizuki, the village of Asashina (both from Kitasaku District), and the old city of Saku to form the new city of Saku.
