= Hokkaido Heritage =

Hokkaidō Heritage (北海道遺産, Hokkaidō isan) is an initiative aimed at the valorization and transmission to the next generation of the tangible and intangible natural, cultural, historical, and industrial heritage of Hokkaidō, Japan. It is advanced by the Hokkaidō Heritage Council (北海道遺産協議会), an NPO, and endorsed by the prefectural government, amongst other bodies. Seventy-four assets have been identified to date in four sessions, the first twenty-five on 22 October 2001, a further twenty-seven on 22 October 2004, fifteen more on 1 November 2018, and, most recently, an additional six (together with the split of "The Ubagami Daijingū Festival and Esashi Oiwake" into two separate assets) on 13 October 2022. The scheme does not include a formal system for management or preservation but is intended to be a citizen-led movement with the concomitant benefits of promoting tourism, fostering pride and a sense of belonging in local communities, developing human capital and potential, and the revitalization of local economies.

Asset	Municipality	Comments	Image	Coordinates	Session	Ref
North Breakwater Dome in Wakkanai Port 稚内港北防波堤ドーム; Wakkanai-kō kita-bōhatei dōmu	Wakkanai	Built in connection with the former Chihaku ferry that connected Wakkanai with Ōdomari, now Korsakov, in what was then Karafuto Prefecture, South Sakhalin		45°25′13″N 141°40′50″E	I	
Circumferential Glacier Topography of Sōya Hills 宗谷丘陵の周氷河地形; Sōya kyūryō no shūhyōga chikei	Wakkanai	Formed around 20,000 years ago during the Last Glacial Period; site of Sōya Misaki Wind Farm		45°28′55″N 141°55′07″E	II	
The Teshio River 天塩川; Teshio-gawa	Bifuka, Horonobe, Kenbuchi, Nakagawa, Nayoro, Otoineppu, Shibetsu, Shimokawa, Teshio, Toyotomi, Wakkanai, Wassamu	At 256 kilometres (159 mi), the second longest river on the island (after the Ishikari River)		44°52′44″N 141°44′18″E	II	
The Herring Highway in Rumoi 留萌のニシン街道; Rumoi no nishin kaidō	Rumoi, Obira, Tomamae	Includes the Former Saga Fishing Ground (旧佐賀家漁場), Former Hanada Banya (旧花田家番屋) (pictured), Okada Residence (岡田家) and Life and Culture		44°08′11″N 141°39′19″E	I	
Historical Buildings in Mashike 増毛の歴史的建物群; Mashike no rekishi-teki tatemono-gun	Mashike	Includes the Former Honma Family Residence (旧本間家住宅) (an Important Cultural Property), Kunimare Brewery (国稀酒造) (pictured), and the historical buildings and Mashike Elementary Schoolhouse (増毛小学校) near Mashike Station		43°51′11″N 141°31′35″E	I	
Asahibashi Bridge 旭橋; Asahi-bashi	Asahikawa	Over the Ishikari River; completed in 1932 to replace the 1892 bridge of wood covered in earth		43°46′44″N 142°21′36″E	II	
Museum of Soils "Mansion of Soils" 土の博物館「土の館」 Tsuchi no Hakubutsukan "Tsuchi no Yakata"	Kamifurano	Tells the story of the agricultural development of the island from the time of the Hokkaidō Development Commission, also of the 1926 eruption of Mount Tokachi		43°27′46″N 142°27′07″E	II	
Uryū Marsh 雨竜沼湿原; Uryū-numa shitsugen	Uryū	In Shokanbetsu-Teuri-Yagishiri Quasi-National Park; a Ramsar Site		43°27′46″N 142°27′07″E	II	
Hokkai Principal Irrigation Channel 北海幹線用水路; Hokkai kansen-yō suiro	Akabira, Bibai, Iwamizawa, Mikasa, Naie, Nanporo, Sunagawa	The longest exclusively agricultural irrigation channel in the country; runs 80 kilometres (50 mi) from Akabira to Nanporo; constructed in four years from 1924; draws water from the Sorachi River (空知川)		43°18′15″N 141°50′59″E	II	
Colliery-related Facilities, and Life and Culture of Sorachi 空知の炭鉱関連施設と生活文化; Sorachi no tankō kanren shisetsu to seikatsu bunka	Ashibetsu, Bibai, Iwamizawa, Utashinai, Yūbari, etc	At the industry's peak in the 1960s there were some 110 mines in Sorachi, with an annual output of 17,500,000 metric tons (17,200,000 long tons; 19,300,000 short tons); all had closed by the 1990s; see Ishikari coalfield, Hokutan Horonai coal mine, Yūbari Coal Mine Museum		43°04′06″N 141°59′21″E	I	
The Ishikari River 天塩川; Ishikari-gawa	Ishikari, etc	The longest on the island and third longest in the country, the river flows from the Daisetsuzan Mountains into the Sea of Japan		43°16′07″N 141°22′18″E	I	
Bricks of Ebetsu 江別のれんが; Ebetsu no renga	Ebetsu	Construction in brick was encouraged by the Hokkaidō Development Commission, resulting in buildings such as the Former Hokkaidō Government Office in Sapporo; at one point there were seventeen brickworks in eight areas of the prefecture, but during the Taishō era they converged on Ebetsu, with its fine clays; three brickworks continue in the area today; there are some four hundred brick buildings in the city, including the Former Hida Factory (旧ヒダ工場) and Ebetsu Glass Crafts Museum (江別市ガラス工芸館) (pictured)		43°05′47″N 141°31′21″E	II	
Hokkaido University, the Sapporo Agricultural College Farm No.2 北海道大学札幌農学校第２農場; Hokkaidō Daigaku Sapporo Nō Gakkō dai-ni nōjō	Sapporo	Founded in 1877 by William S. Clark as a "model" farm		43°04′56″N 141°20′25″E	I	
The European Architecture in the Era of the Hokkaidō Development Commission 開拓使時代の洋風建築; Kaitakushi jidai no yōfū kenchiku	Sapporo	Includes the Sapporo Clock Tower, Hōheikan (pictured), Seikatei, Former Nagayama Residence (永山邸), Bureau of Industry Office Building (旧開拓使工業局庁舎), etc		43°03′45″N 141°21′13″E	II	
The Factories and Memorial Halls in Naebo, Sapporo 札幌苗穂地区の工場・記念館群; Sapporo Naebo chiku no kōjō kinenkan-gun	Sapporo	Includes the Hokkaidō Railway Technology Museum (北海道鉄道技術館), Sapporo Beer Museum (pictured), Snow Brand Milk Products Archives (雪印乳業史料館), Fukuyama Brewery (福山醸造), etc		43°04′17″N 141°22′08″E	II	
Otaru Minato Harbour and Breakwater 小樽みなとと防波堤; Otaru minato to bōhatei	Otaru	The north breakwater was designed by Hiroi Isami (広井勇), inspired by the Port of Colombo, and makes use of sloping blocks; the south breakwater was constructed using caissons; cf. Otaru Canal (小樽運河)		43°11′18″N 141°01′52″E	I	
Nikka Whisky Yoichi Distillery ニッカウヰスキー余市蒸溜所; Nikka Uwisukii Yoichi jōryū-sho	Yoichi	Taketsuru Masataka opened his distillery here in 1934, malt whisky production starting two years later		43°11′08″N 140°47′21″E	II	
The Shakotan Peninsula and Cape Kamui 積丹半島と神威岬; Shakotan-hantō to Kamui-misaki	Shakotan etc	Remains of the old herring industry, which prospered from the Meiji period to the Shōwa era include a banya (番屋), unloading place, fish ponds, tunnels, and roads		43°20′01″N 140°20′47″E	II	
Natural Spring Water in Kyōgoku 京極のふきだし湧水; Kyōgoku no fukidashi yūsui	Kyōgoku	One of the largest springs in the country, replenished by snow thaw from Mount Yōtei that filters through minerals underground; selected in 1985 by the Environmental Agency as one of the 100 Select Waters (名水百選)		42°51′29″N 140°52′08″E	I	
Skiing and the Niseko Mountains スキーとニセコ連峰; Sukii to Niseko renpō	Kutchan, Niseko	Skiing grew in popularity both locally and across the country at large in the 1960s		42°51′42″N 140°41′53″E	II	
Beech Forests at the Northern Boundary 北限のブナ林; Hokugen no buna bayashi	Kuromatsunai	The Oshima Peninsula marks the northern limit of this temperate zone tree; in Nanae there is a beech forest planted by Reinhold Gaertner (ガルトネル), son of painter Eduard and brother of Hakodate Consul Conrad		42°39′35″N 140°19′10″E	II	
Shōwashinzan International Snowball Fight Festival 昭和新山国際雪合戦大会; Shōwa-shinzan Kokusai Yukigassen Taikai	Sōbetsu	Shōwa-shinzan or "new mountain of the Shōwa era" was formed by volcanic lava in the 1940s; this competitive snowballing or yuki-gassen began in 1989		42°32′27″N 140°51′27″E	I	
Noboribetsu Onsen Jigoku-dani 登別温泉地獄谷; Noboribetsu onsen Jigoku-dani	Noboribetsu	There are fifteen so-called thermal "hells" in the valley, which is surrounded by Ōyu Pond (大湯沼), with a surface temperature that reaches 50 °C (122 °F), the smoking Mount Hiyori (日和山), and Noboribetsu Primaeval Forest (登別原始林)		42°29′51″N 141°08′55″E	II	
The Remains of Jōmon Culture on the Coast of Uchiura Gulf 内浦湾沿岸の縄文文化遺跡群; Uchiura-wan engan no Jōmon bunka iseki-gun	Date, Hakodate, etc	Four million artefacts, including "Hollow Dogū", have been found at eighty-nine sites in Hakodate alone; see Ōfune Site|, Kitakogane Shell Mound (北黄金貝塚), Jōmon Archaeological Sites in Hokkaidō, Northern Tōhoku, and other regions; cf. Zoku-Jōmon period		42°24′04″N 140°54′40″E	I	
The Ubagami Daijingū Festival 姥神大神宮渡御祭; Ubagami Daijingū togyo-sai	Esashi	Herring-related matsuri, some 360 years old		41°51′59″N 140°07′30″E	I	
Esashi Oiwake 江差追分; Esashi oiwake	Esashi	folk song		41°52′07″N 140°07′36″E	II	
The Former Fort from the 15th Century in Kaminokuni 上ノ国の中世の館; Kaminokuni no chūsei no tate	Kaminokuni	Katsuyama-date (勝山館跡), built by Takeda Nobuhiro, ancestor of the Matsumae clan; cf. Shinori-date, Yafurai-date, Continued Top 100 Japanese Castles		41°48′05″N 140°06′03″E	I	
Fukuyama (Matsumae) Castle and its Temple District 福山（松前）城と寺町; Fukuyama (Matsumae)-jō to teramachi	Matsumae	The last castle to be built in Edo period Japan; it served as the base for the Matsumae Domain daimyō and later as a battleground during the Boshin War and Battle of Hakodate; to the north of the castle is a temple district with five temples, Hōdō-ji (法幢寺), family temple and burial site of the Matsumae clan daimyō, Aun-ji (阿吽寺), Hōgen-ji (法源寺), Kōzen-ji (光善寺), and Ryūun-in; famous for its cherry blossoms		41°25′48″N 140°06′30″E	I	
Goryōkaku and the Relics of the Battle of Hakodate 五稜郭と箱館戦争の遺構; Goryōkaku to Hakodate sensō no ikō	Hakodate etc	Includes Goryōkaku, Shiryōkaku, Fukuyama Castle, the waters off Kamome Island where the Japanese frigate Kaiyō Maru sank, Washinoki, where the shogunate forces under Enomoto Takeaki landed, the battlefield of Futamataguchi (二股口), the Otobe Coast (乙部海岸), where the new Meiji Government forces made landfall, the Ippongi Checkpoint (一本木関門跡), where Hijikata Toshizō was killed, etc		41°47′49″N 140°45′24″E	II	
Mount Hakodate and the Remains of the Batteries 函館山と砲台跡; Hakodate-yama to hōdai ato	Hakodate	Famous as the location for one of the Three Night Views of Japan; fortified from the mid-Meiji period		41°45′24″N 140°42′06″E	I	
Seibuchiku Area in Hakodate 函館西部地区の街並み; Hakodate Seibu-chiku no machi-nami	Hakodate	The Port of Hakodate was a treaty port that opened to foreign ships in Ansei 6 (1859); includes the red brick warehouses, Former Public Hall of Hakodate Ward (旧函館区公会堂) (pictured), Hakodate Orthodox Church (函館ハリストス正教会), etc; see Important Preservation Districts for Groups of Traditional Buildings		41°45′46″N 140°42′44″E	II	
The Tramways 路面電車; Romen densha	Hakodate, Sapporo	Hakodate City Tram (pictured) first operated as a horse-drawn railway car in 1897 and was electrified in 1913; the Sapporo Streetcar began operations in 1918		41°46′20″N 140°43′40″E	I	
The Cherry Trees on Nijikken Road in Shizunai 静内二十間道路の桜並木; Shizunai Nijikken-dōro no sakura namiki	Shinhidaka	With the Hidaka Mountains as backdrop, some three thousand cherry trees, including 90-year old Ezoyama cherries, line a 7 kilometres (4.3 mi) stretch of the Nijikken Road that runs between Shizunai and Niikappu, to the pastures opened in line with Kuroda Kiyotaka's advice for the rearing of larger horses from the native breeds		42°23′49″N 142°26′28″E	II	
Mōru Hot Springs モール温泉; Mōru onsen	Otofuke	The name is derived from the German Moor, the springs rising through peat; includes Tokachigawa Onsen (十勝川温泉)		42°55′56″N 143°17′48″E	II	
Rawan Butterburs ラワンブキ; Rawan-buki	Ashoro	Giant butterburs that grow to a height of 2 metres (6.6 ft) to 3 metres (9.8 ft) along the Rawan River (螺湾川); it is said they used to grow to a height of some 4 metres (13 ft); cf. Koropokkuru (pictured)		43°20′16″N 143°50′44″E	I	
The Former National Railroad and Concrete Arch Bridges of the Shihoro Line 旧国鉄士幌線コンクリートアーチ橋梁群 kyū-Kokutetsu Shihoro-sen konkurīto āchi kyōryō-gun	Kamishihoro	Thirty-four bridges from the early Shōwa era are preserved, including Taushubetsu Bridge (タウシュベツ川橋梁) (pictured)		43°24′56″N 143°11′20″E	I	
Kiritappu Wetland 霧多布湿原; Kiritappu shitsugen	Hamanaka	A Ramsar Site and Wildlife Protection Area; in Akkeshi Prefectural Natural Park; its "peat-forming plant communities" are a Natural Monument		43°05′04″N 145°04′48″E	I	
Lake Mashū 摩周湖; Mashū-ko	Teshikaga	An endorheic crater lake in Akan National Park said to be one of world's clearest lakes		43°35′00″N 144°31′42″E	I	
The Konsen Highland Windbreak 根釧台地の格子状防風林; Konsen daichi no kōshi-jō bōfū-rin	Betsukai, Nakashibetsu, Shibecha, Shibetsu	A grid formed by bands of trees some 180 metres (590 ft) wide that run a total of 648 kilometres (403 mi)		43°11′37″N 145°02′11″E	I	
The Notsuke Peninsula and the Utase Boats 野付半島と打瀬舟; Notsuke-hantō to utase-bune	Betsukai, Shibetsu	The biggest sandspit in Japan, extending 26 kilometres (16 mi); there are remains of Satsumon culture pit dwellings, while in the Edo period there was a checkpoint regulating travel and trade with Kunashir Island		43°36′12″N 145°17′32″E	II	
Wakka/Koshimizu primaeval flower garden ワッカ／小清水原生花園; Wakka/Koshimizu gensei ka-en	Kitami, Koshimizu	Facing the Sea of Okhotsk and Lake Saroma, the Wakka Primaeval Flower Garden is the longest stretch of undeveloped and uncultivated land on the coastline of Japan and has some three hundred different flowers; see Lake Tōfutsu		44°08′08″N 143°57′39″E	I	
The Pierson Memorial House ピアソン記念館; Piason Kinenkan	Kitami	Built in 1914 as the home for American missionaries George and Ida Pierson by architect Merrell Vories Hitotsuyanagi		43°48′24″N 143°53′13″E	I	
The Forest Railroad Steam Locomotive "Amamiya No.21" 森林鉄道蒸気機関車「雨宮21号」 Shinrin Tetsudō jōki kikansha "Amamiya 21-gō"	Engaru	See Hokkaido Maruseppu Recreation Forest Park Railway		43°55′55″N 143°20′12″E	II	
Ancient Remains along the Okhotsk Coast オホーツク沿岸の古代遺跡群; Ohōtsuku engan no kodai iseki-gun	Abashiri, Engaru, Kitami, Shari, etc	Deposits from the Paleolithic, Jōmon and Zoku-Jōmon periods, Okhotsk culture and Ainu; includes the Shirataki Site (白滝遺跡), Moyoro Shell Mound (モヨロ貝塚), and Tokoro Site (常呂遺跡); see Yūbetsu technique		44°01′30″N 144°16′05″E	II	
Ice Floes and Garinko 流氷とガリンコ号; Ryūhyō to Garinko-gō	Monbetsu	'"Drift Ice in the Sea of Okhotsk" is one of the 100 Soundscapes of Japan; Garinko (pictured) is an icebreaker		44°20′01″N 143°22′23″E	II	
Villages of the Farmer-Soldiers and Military Barracks 屯田兵村と兵屋; Tondenhei mura to heioku	Akkeshi, Ebetsu, Nemuro, Sapporo, Shibetsu, etc	See Tondenhei		43°04′35″N 141°18′07″E	II	
Hokkaidō Horse Culture 北海道の馬文化; Hokkaidō no uma bunka	Obihiro, etc	See Ban'ei, Dosanko		42°55′16″N 143°10′56″E	II	
Ainu Place Names アイヌ語地名; Ainu-go chimei	passim	Some 80% of Hokkaidō's Place Names are said to be derived from the Ainu language		42°38′07″N 142°09′41″E	I	
Ainu Patterns アイヌ文様; Ainu monyō	passim	The three fundamental Ainu designs are the spiral (モレウ, moreu), thorn pattern (アイウシ, aiushi), and fish scale pattern (ラムラムノカ, ramramnoka), that are then endlessly reimagined and recombined		42°38′13″N 142°09′25″E	I	
Ainu Oral Culture アイヌ口承文芸; Ainu kōshō bungei	passim	See Yukar, Kutune Shirka, Imekanu, Chiri Yukie (pictured)		42°33′41″N 141°22′01″E	II	
The Culture of Salmon サケの文化; Sake no bunka	passim	See Japan Heritage "story" #084, Shibetsu Salmon Science Museum		43°39′36″N 145°06′59″E	II	
Hokkaidō Ramen Noodles 北海道のラーメン; Hokkaidō no rāmen	Asahikawa, Hakodate, Kushiro, Sapporo, etc	See Regional variations of ramen, Muroran curry ramen		43°03′20″N 141°21′12″E	I	
Genghis Khan ジンギスカン; Jingisukan	passim	Involves a distinctively-shaped cooking pan (pictured)		43°03′20″N 141°21′12″E	II	
Rishiri Island Fishing Industry Heritage Sites and Life and Culture 利尻島の漁業遺産群と生活文化; Rishiritō no gyogyō isan-gun to seikatsu bunka	Rishiri, Rishirifuji	The key products of Rishiri Island (pictured) included herring, kombu, abalone, and sea cucumbers; in the Edo period there was a trading station for traders from Matsumae Domain and the Ōmi merchants (近江商人), while the Kitamaebune were involved in particular in the shipping of herring; after the Meiji Restoration, fishermen arrived from Matsumae, Aomori, and Akita; there are remains of a fukuroma (袋澗), a port facility for the temporary storage of herring, and a banya (番屋), a working station for fishermen, other inherited assets including shrines and offerings relating to safe voyages and plentiful catches, stone stelai, and lion dances; see Rishiri-Rebun-Sarobetsu National Park		45°06′47″N 141°12′58″E	III	
Asahikawa Furniture 旭川家具; Asahikawa kagu	Asahikawa	Includes the Oda Collection, "connecting wooden furniture culture with the world" (木製家具文化と世界につなぐ織田コレクション)		43°48′00″N 142°24′56″E	III	
Miura Ayako Literature Museum and Foreign Species Specimen Forest 三浦綾子記念文学館と外国樹種見本林; Miura Ayako Kinen Bungakukan to Gaikoku Jushu Mihon-rin	Asahikawa			43°45′13″N 142°20′53″E	III	
Mashike Mountain Trail and Gokibiru Mountain Trail 増毛山道と濃昼山道; Mahike-sandō to Gokibiru-sandō	Ishikari, Mashike			43°50′07″N 141°29′16″E	III	
Hokkaidō Shūchikan Prisons 北海道の集治監; Hokkaidō no shūchikan	Abashiri, Mikasa, Obihiro, Shibecha, Tsukigata	Five penitentiaries built between 1881 and 1893 to house political prisoners from the Satsuma Rebellion, and later for those convicted of serious crimes; see Abashiri Prison Museum (pictured)		43°59′46″N 144°13′43″E	III	
Otaru Railway Heritage 小樽の鉄道遺産; Otaru no tetsudō isan	Otaru	See Otaru Station, Otaru City General Museum, Former Temiya Line		43°12′40″N 141°00′03″E	III	
Achievements of Ōtomo Kametarō and Remains of Ōtomo-bori 大友亀太郎の事績と大友堀遺構; Ōtomo Kametarō no jiseki to Ōtomo-bori ikō	Sapporo			43°05′58″N 141°20′44″E	III	
Pacific Music Festival パシフィック・ミュージック・フェスティバル; Pashifikku myūjikku fesutibaru	Sapporo	Founded by Leonard Bernstein in 1990		42°56′20″N 141°20′24″E	III	
Sapporo Soft Stone 札幌軟石; Sapporo nanseki	Sapporo			42°58′09″N 141°20′29″E	III	
Three Government Temples of Ezo 蝦夷三官寺; Ezo Sankanji	Akkeshi, Date, Samani	Kokutai-ji (国泰寺), Usu Zenkō-ji (有珠善光寺), Tōju-in (等澍院)		43°01′56″N 144°50′18″E	III	
Shikabe Geyser しかべ間歇泉; Shikabe kanketsusen	Shikabe			42°01′43″N 140°49′50″E	III	
Mukawa Town Hobetsu Fossils of Sentient Beings of Old むかわ町穂別の古生物化石群; Mukawa-chō Hobetsu no koseibutsu kaseki-gun	Mukawa			42°45′58″N 142°08′09″E	III	
Hokkaidō Basic Railroads 北海道の簡易軌道; Hokkaidō no kan'i kidō	Tsurui, etc			43°13′43″N 144°19′33″E	III	
Chishimazakura Cherry Trees 千島桜; Chishima-zakura	passim			43°19′43″N 145°34′32″E	III	
Traces of the Exploration of Ezo by Matsuura Takeshirō 松浦武四郎による蝦夷地踏査の足跡; Matsuura Takeshirō ni yoru Ezo-chi tōsa no ashiato	passim			43°03′12″N 141°29′48″E	III	
Shimokawa Circular Forest Culture しもかわの循環型森林文化; Shimokawa no junkan-gata shinrin bunka	Shimokawa	hōseirin (法正林) sustainable forestry		44°18′02″N 142°38′35″E	IV	
The Roots of Hokkaidō Rice, Akage-mai 北海道米のルーツ「赤毛米」 Hokkaidō kome no rūtsu「akage-mai」	Kitahiroshima	in 1873, Nakayama Kyūzō (中山久蔵) successfully cultivated the akage-mai variety of cold-climate rice at Shimamatsu		42°55′24″N 141°32′15″E	IV	
Imakane and Pirika Gold Mine Sites 今金・美利河の金山遺跡; Imakane・Pirika no kinzan iseki	Imakane			42°28′14″N 140°11′27″E	IV	
Sendai Domain Shiraoi Moto-Jin'ya 仙台藩白老元陣屋; Sendai-han Shiraoi moto-jin'ya	Shiraoi	jin'ya		42°33′51″N 141°20′36″E	IV	
Sea of Trees at Tokachi-Mitsumata 十勝三股の樹海; Tokachi Mitsumata no jukai	Kamishihoro			43°31′00″N 143°09′00″E	IV	
Shimo-no-ku Karuta 下の句かるた shimo-no-ku karuta	passim	variant of uta-garuta			IV	

== See also ==
- Cultural Properties of Japan
- Japan Heritage
- List of Historic Sites of Japan (Hokkaidō)
- List of Cultural Properties of Japan - structures (Hokkaidō)
- List of Natural Monuments of Japan (Hokkaidō)
