= Yūbari City Museum of Art =

Museum in Yūbari, Hokkaido, Japan

- 夕張市美術館
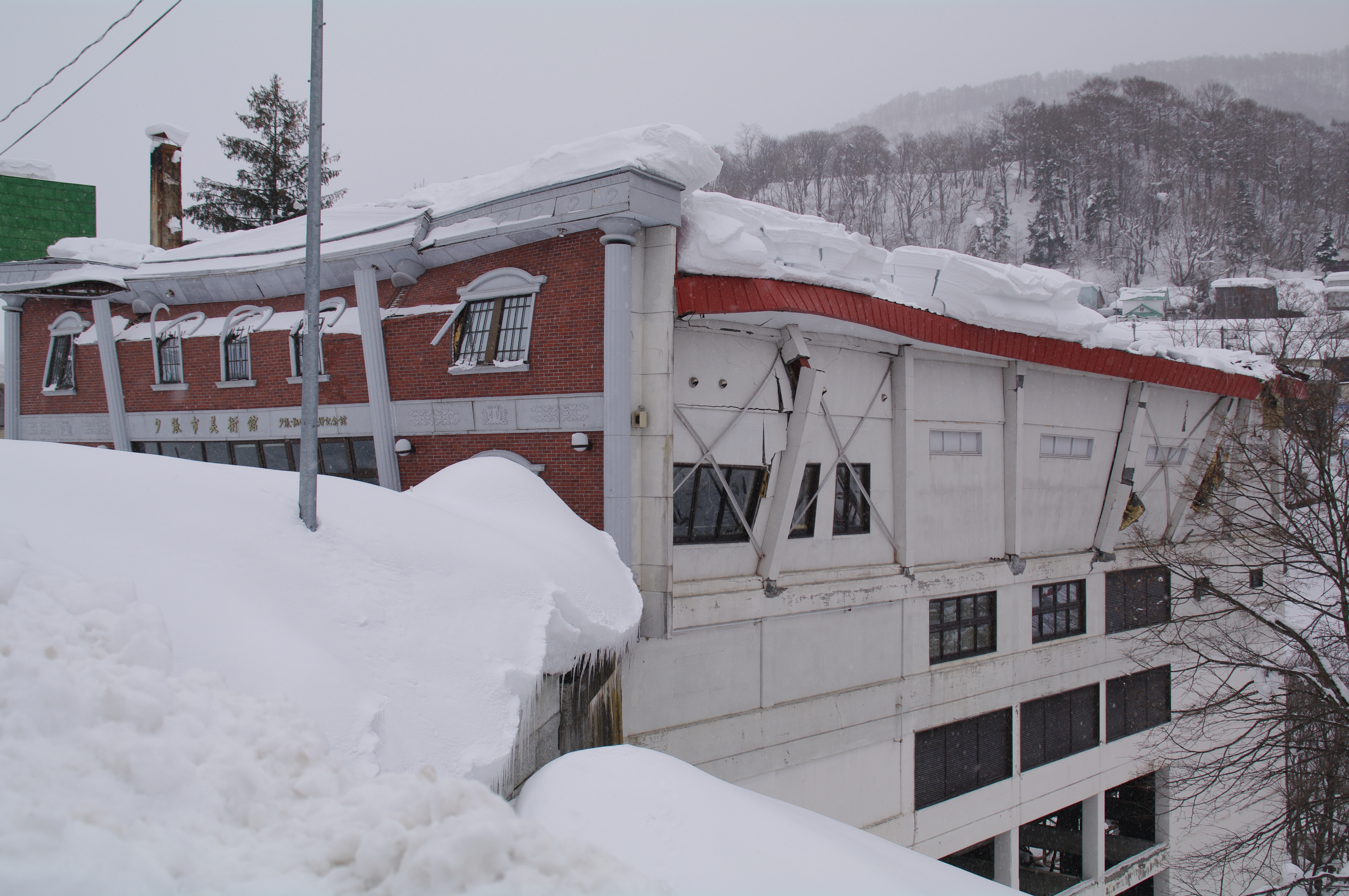
- Interactive map of the Yūbari City Museum of Art area

General information
- Location: 4-3 Asahimachi, Yūbari, Hokkaido, Japan
- Coordinates: 43°03′29″N 141°58′30″E
- Opened: 1979
- Closed: February 2012

Website
- Official website (in Japanese)

Yūbari City Museum of Art (夕張市美術館, Yūbari-shi Bijutsukan) opened in Yūbari, Hokkaido, Japan in 1979. In February 2012, the museum's roof collapsed after heavy snowfall; due to the city's financial difficulties, the museum has since remained closed. The collection was undamaged and, since the museum's closure, has been stored in other facilities in the city, featuring in a number of temporary exhibitions.

== See also ==
- Yūbari Coal Mine Museum
- Yubari King
