= Toyohashi Railroad Atsumi Line =

Railway line in Aichi prefecture, Japan

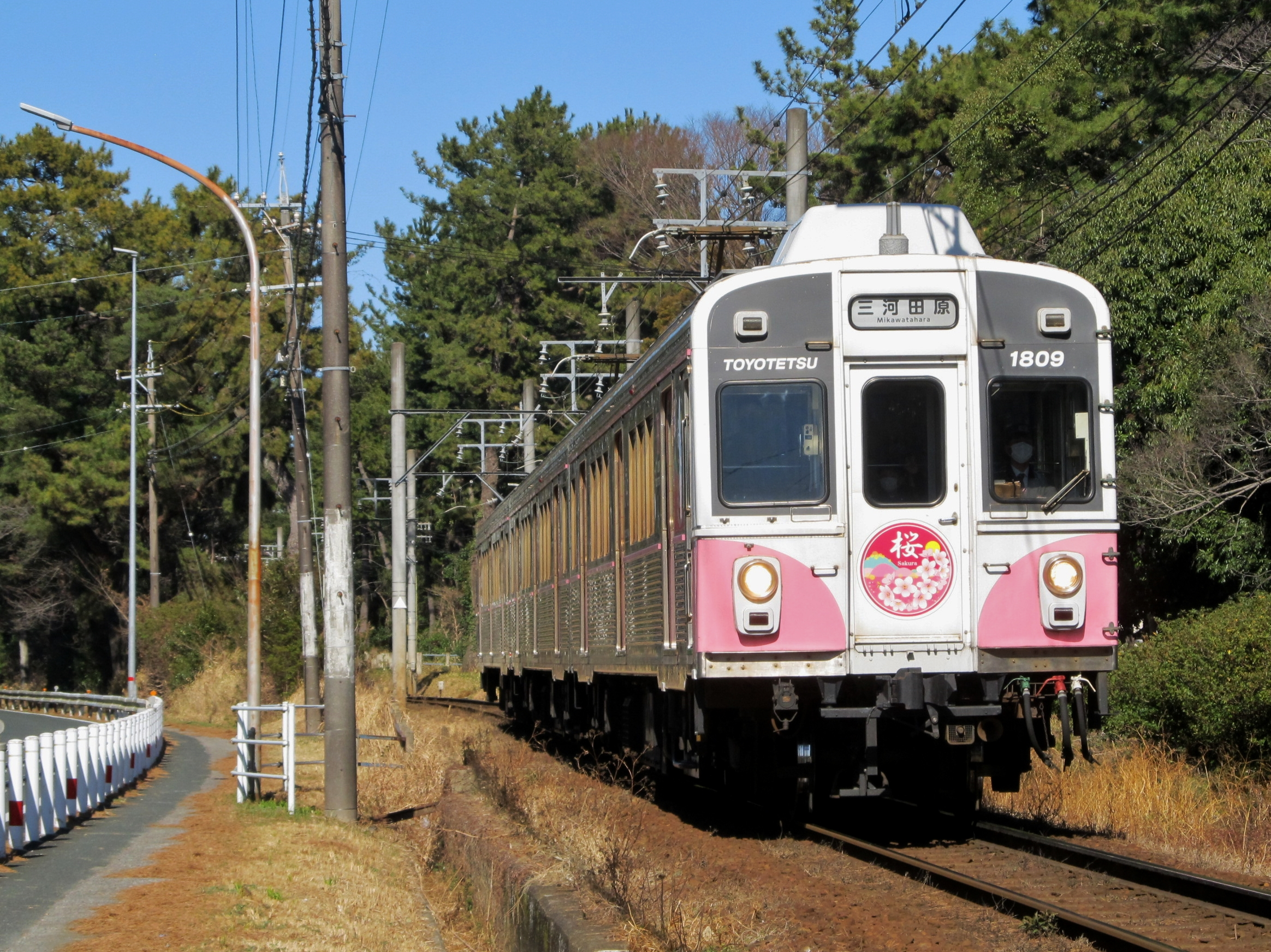
- A 1800 series EMU bound for Mikawa Tahara Station in February 2023

Overview
- Native name: 豊橋鉄道渥美線
- Locale: Aichi Prefecture
- Termini: Shin-Toyohashi; Mikawa Tahara
- Stations: 16
- Website: www.toyotetsu.com

Service
- Type: Heavy rail
- Operator(s): Toyohashi Railroad
- Rolling stock: 1800 series EMUs

History
- Opened: January 22, 1924; 102 years ago

Technical
- Line length: 18.0 km (11.2 mi)
- Number of tracks: single
- Track gauge: 3 ft 6 in (1,067 mm)
- Electrification: 1,500 V DC overhead
- Operating speed: 70 km/h (45 mph)
- Train protection system: ATS-PT (compatible with Meitetsu)

Linemap of Atsumi Line

The Toyohashi Railroad Atsumi Line (豊橋鉄道渥美線, Toyohashi Tetsudō Atsumi-sen) is a railway line in eastern Aichi Prefecture, Japan, operated by the private railway operator Toyohashi Railroad ("Toyotetsu"). The line is entirely within the cities of Toyohashi and Tahara.

== History ==
=== Planning and construction ===
Plans to construct a railway going across the Atsumi Peninsula have been planned since the 15th Division was stationed in Toyohashi. 12 people with the financial help of Keijiro Amemiya planned building a light railway in 1909, but the railway wasn't constructed, and the permit expired. The Amami Light Railway was established in 1918 by locals, but was split on whether the railway should be operated by the government or not, and the privately owned Atsumi Electric Railway (渥美電鉄, Atsumi Dentetsu) was established in 1919 as a result. The company began operations on January 22, 1924 between Takashi and Toshima, electrified at 600 V DC. The line was extended to Kambe in March and to Mikawa Tahara by June 10 of the same year. In the opposite direction, the line was extended to Shin-Toyohashi by May 1925. On April 10, 1926, the now-defunct section of track from Mikawa Tahara to Kurokawahara was completed. Construction of a proposed extension to Mikawa Fukue commenced in 1939, but was later abandoned due to World War II.

On September 1, 1940, the Atsumi Electric Railway was merged into Nagoya Railway (Meitetsu). The section between Mikawa Tahara and Kurokawahara and many stations were suspended on June 5, 1944, due to steel shortage. Three P-51 Mustang aircraft attacked a train heading to Toyohashi on August 14, 1945, killing 15 people and injuring an additional 16.

=== Under Toyohashi Railroad operation ===
On October 1, 1954, the Toyohashi Railroad was spun out from the Nagoya Railway as an independently operating subsidiary. The suspended section from Mikawa Tahara to Kurokawahara was permanently closed November of that year. The timetable was revised on October 1, 1965 to introduce a express services that runs 18 times a day. This express service was abolished on September 1, 1985. All freight operations were discontinued from February 1, 1984. On July 2, 1997, the line's infrastructure was upgraded to allow railway electrification at 1500 V DC. 28 Meitetsu 7300 series trains were transferred from Meitetsu to operate in the line. The line also began supporting the Meitetsu-style automatic train stop system.

== Infrastructure ==
=== Rolling stock ===
As of 2024, the line is operated using a fleet of ten three-car 1800 series electric multiple unit (EMU) trains. These trains were modified from former Tokyu 7200 series EMUs.

Since 2013, the trains are each painted a different color and carry the names of flowers, as follows.

| Set No. | Flower name | Colour |
|---|---|---|
| 1801 | Rose (ばら, Bara) | Red |
| 1802 | Hibiscus (はまぼう, Hamabou) | Brown |
| 1803 | Rhododendron (つつじ, Tsutsuji) | Red |
| 1804 | Sunflower (ひまわり, Himawari) | Blue |
| 1805 | Sweet flag (菖蒲, Shoubu) | Purple |
| 1806 | Magnolia (しでこぶし, Shidekobushi) | Light green |
| 1807 | Rape blossom (菜の花, Nanohana) | Yellow |
| 1808 | Camellia (椿, Tsubaki) | Green |
| 1809 | Cherry blossom (桜, Sakura) | Pink |
| 1810 | Chrysanthemum (菊, Kiku) | Orange |

=== Stations ===
There are a total of 16 stations on the line, with a signal station between Shin-Toyohashi and Yagyu-bashi.

| No. | Image | Station name | Japanese | Distance from Shin-Toyohashi (km) | Transfers | Location |
|---|---|---|---|---|---|---|
| 1 | | Shin-Toyohashi | 新豊橋 | 0.0 | JR Central (Toyohashi Station) Tokaido Shinkansen, Tokaido Main Line, Iida Line Meitetsu (Toyohashi Station) ■ Nagoya Main Line Toyohashi Railroad (Ekimae Station) ■ Azumada Main Line | Toyohashi |
| 2 | | Yagyu-bashi | 柳生橋 | 1.0 | | Toyohashi |
| 3 | | Koike | 小池 | 1.7 | | Toyohashi |
| 4 | | Aichidaigakumae | 愛知大学前 | 2.5 | | Toyohashi |
| 5 | | Minami-Sakae | 南栄 | 3.2 | | Toyohashi |
| 6 | | Takashi | 高師 | 4.3 | | Toyohashi |
| 7 | | Ashihara | 芦原 | 5.3 | | Toyohashi |
| 8 | | Ueta | 植田 | 6.3 | | Toyohashi |
| 9 | | Mukougaoka | 向ヶ丘 | 7.1 | | Toyohashi |
| 10 | | Ōshimizu | 大清水 | 8.5 | | Toyohashi |
| 11 | | Oitsu | 老津 | 10.7 | | Toyohashi |
| 12 | | Sugiyama | 杉山 | 12.7 | | Toyohashi |
| 13 | | Yagumadai | やぐま台 | 14.0 | | Tahara |
| 14 | | Toshima | 豊島 | 15.6 | | Tahara |
| 15 | | Kambe | 神戸 | 17.1 | | Tahara |
| 16 | | Mikawa Tahara | 三河田原 | 18.0 | | Tahara |

== Network and operation ==
The line runs through the Atsumi Peninsula in Aichi Prefecture, Japan. The line is generally used by commuters from the peninsula to Toyohashi. Several residential districts have been developed near the stations. The northern terminal station for the Atsumi Line is located at Shin-Toyohashi Station. Most trains run to the southern terminus at Mikawa Tahara Station at approximately 15 minute intervals, with the exception of the last train departing Shin-Toyohashi Station. There are no express trains on the line.

=== Ridership ===
| No. | Station | Passengers (2023) |
|---|---|---|
| 1 | Shin-Toyohashi | 14,528 |
| 2 | Yagyu-bashi | 1,081 |
| 3 | Koike | 744 |
| 4 | Aichidaigakumae | 4,542 |
| 5 | Minami-sakae | 3,267 |
| 6 | Takashi | 2,236 |
| 7 | Ashihara | 600 |
| 8 | Ueta | 644 |
| 9 | Mukougaoka | 568 |
| 10 | Ōshimizu | 2,566 |
| 11 | Oitsu | 484 |
| 12 | Sugiyama | 409 |
| 13 | Yagumadai | 364 |
| 14 | Toshima | 350 |
| 15 | Kanbe | 379 |
| 16 | Mikawa Tahara | 2,306 |

== See also ==
- List of railway lines in Japan
