= Shibetsu Salmon Science Museum =

Fishing museum in Shibetsu, Japan

- 標津サーモン科学館
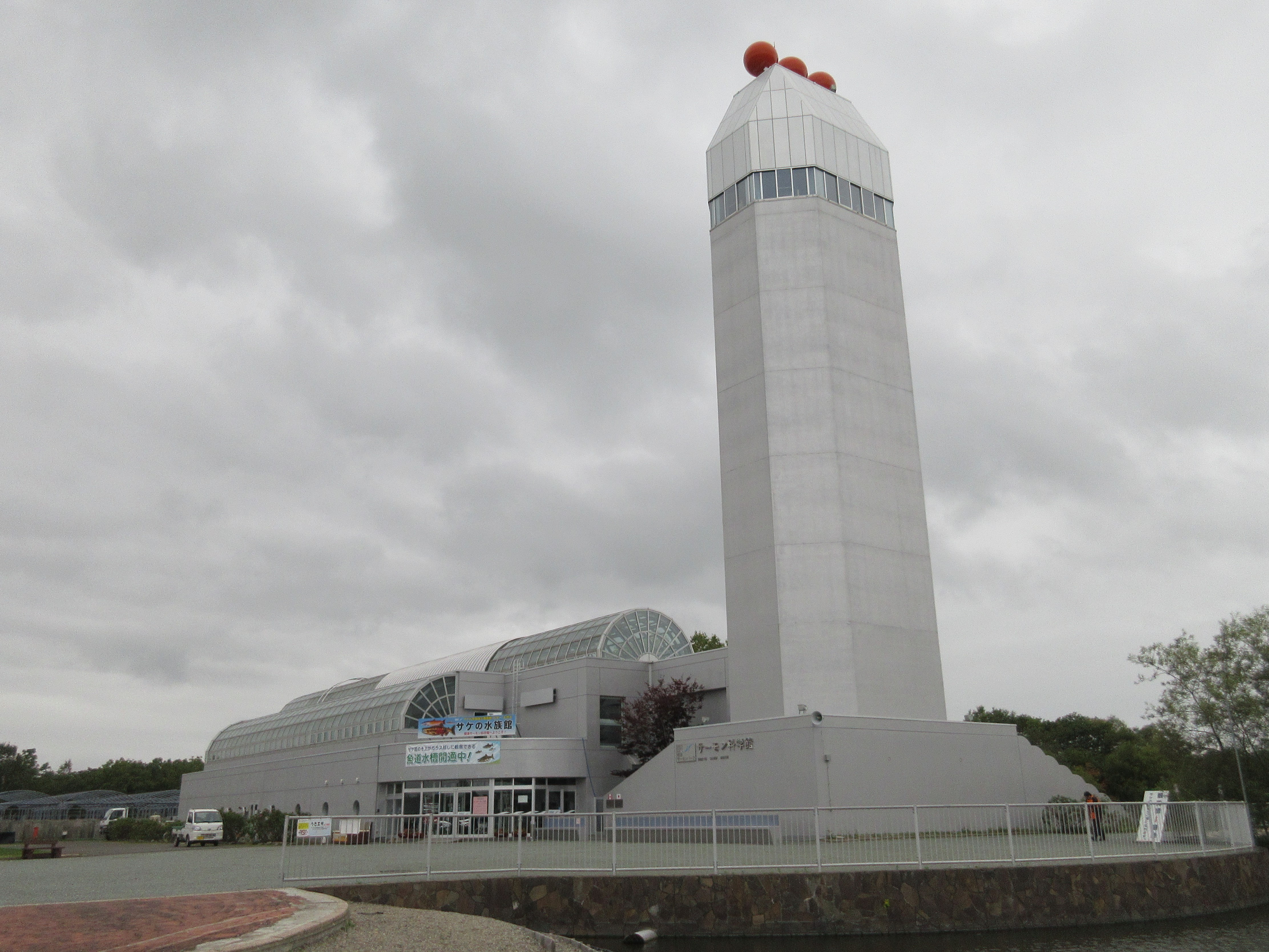
- Interactive map of the Shibetsu Salmon Science Museum area

General information
- Location: 1-1-1 Nishi 6-chōme Kita 1-jō, Shibetsu, Hokkaidō, Japan
- Coordinates: 43°39′36″N 145°06′58″E
- Opened: 1991

Website
- Official website

Shibetsu Salmon Science Museum (標津サーモン科学館, Shibetsu Sāmon Kagaku-kan) opened in Shibetsu, Hokkaidō, Japan in 1991. It is dedicated to the ecology of the world's salmonids and to Hokkaidō's salmon culture. In 1992 there were 130,000 visitors, while in 2011 the number dropped to 50,000.

== See also ==
- Salmon conservation
- Shellfish Museum of Rankoshi
