= Hokkaido Maruseppu Recreation Forest Park Railway =

Japanese heritage railway

Coordinates: 43.9319°N 143.3344°E

Maruseppu Forest Park Ikoi-no-Mori Railway
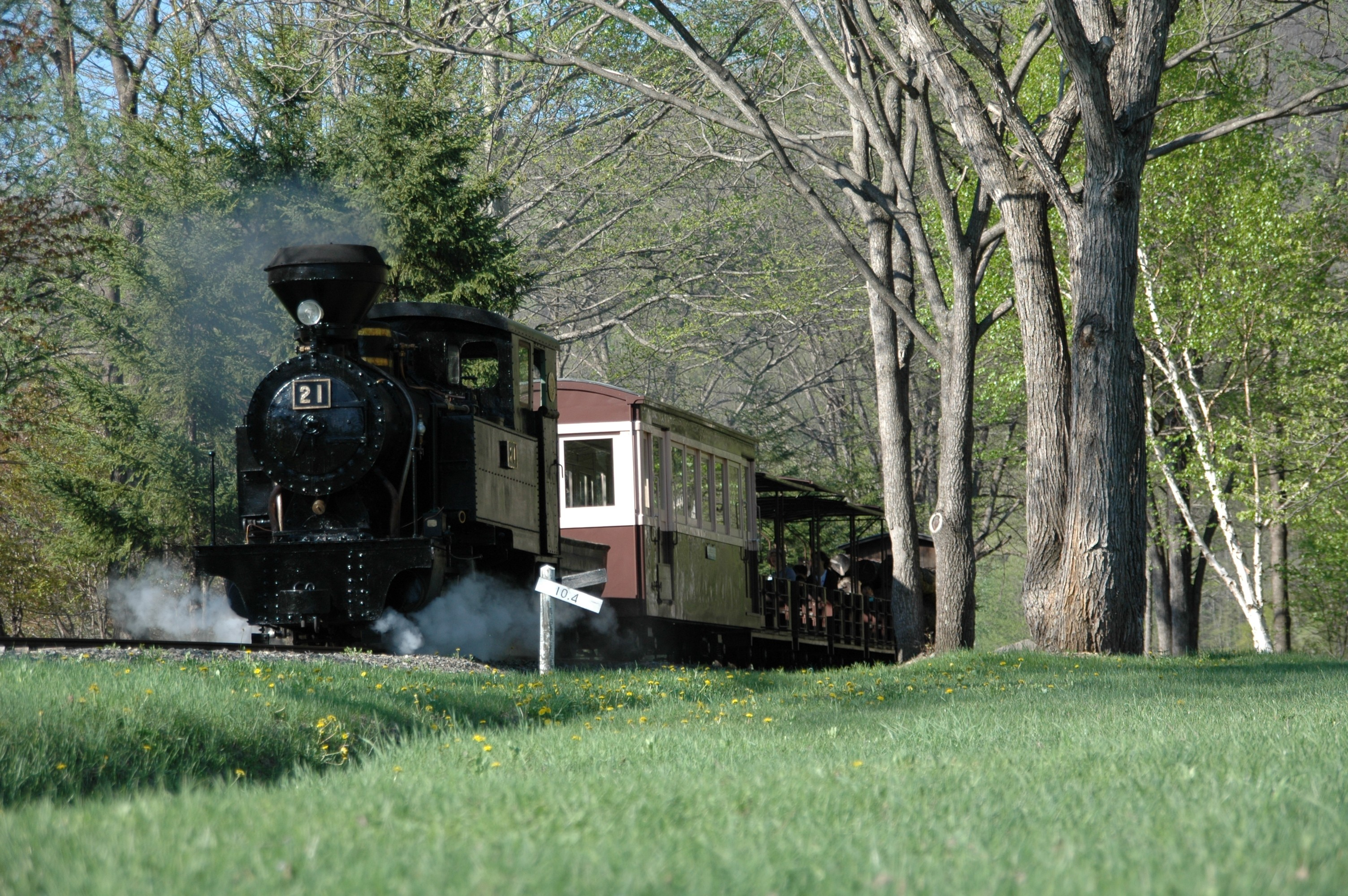
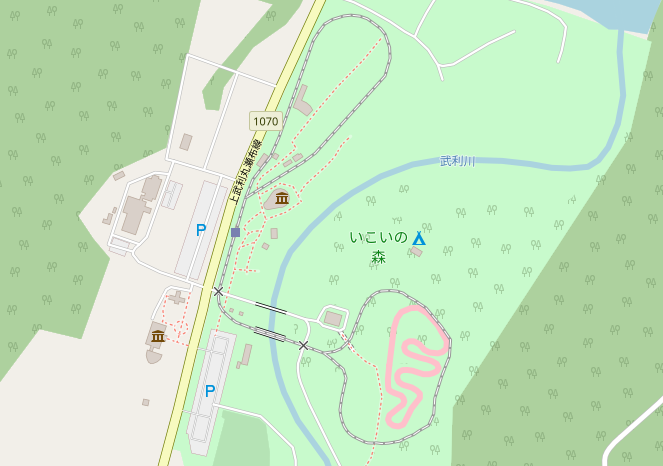
- Steam locomotive Amemiya 21-go Track

Technical
- Line length: ca. 1.24 miles (2.00 km)
- Track gauge: 2 ft 6 in (762 mm)

The Hokkaido Maruseppu Recreation Forest Park Railway or Maruseppu Forest Park Ikoi-no-Mori Railway (Japanese: 丸瀬布森林公園いこいの森鉄道, Maruseppu Shinrinkōen Ikoi no Mori Tetsudō) is an approximately 1.24 miles (2.00 km) long narrow gauge heritage railway with a track gauge of 2 ft 6 in (762 mm) near the Japanese City of Engaru near Mombetsu in the Okhotsk Subprefecture on the island Hokkaidō.

== Infrastructure ==
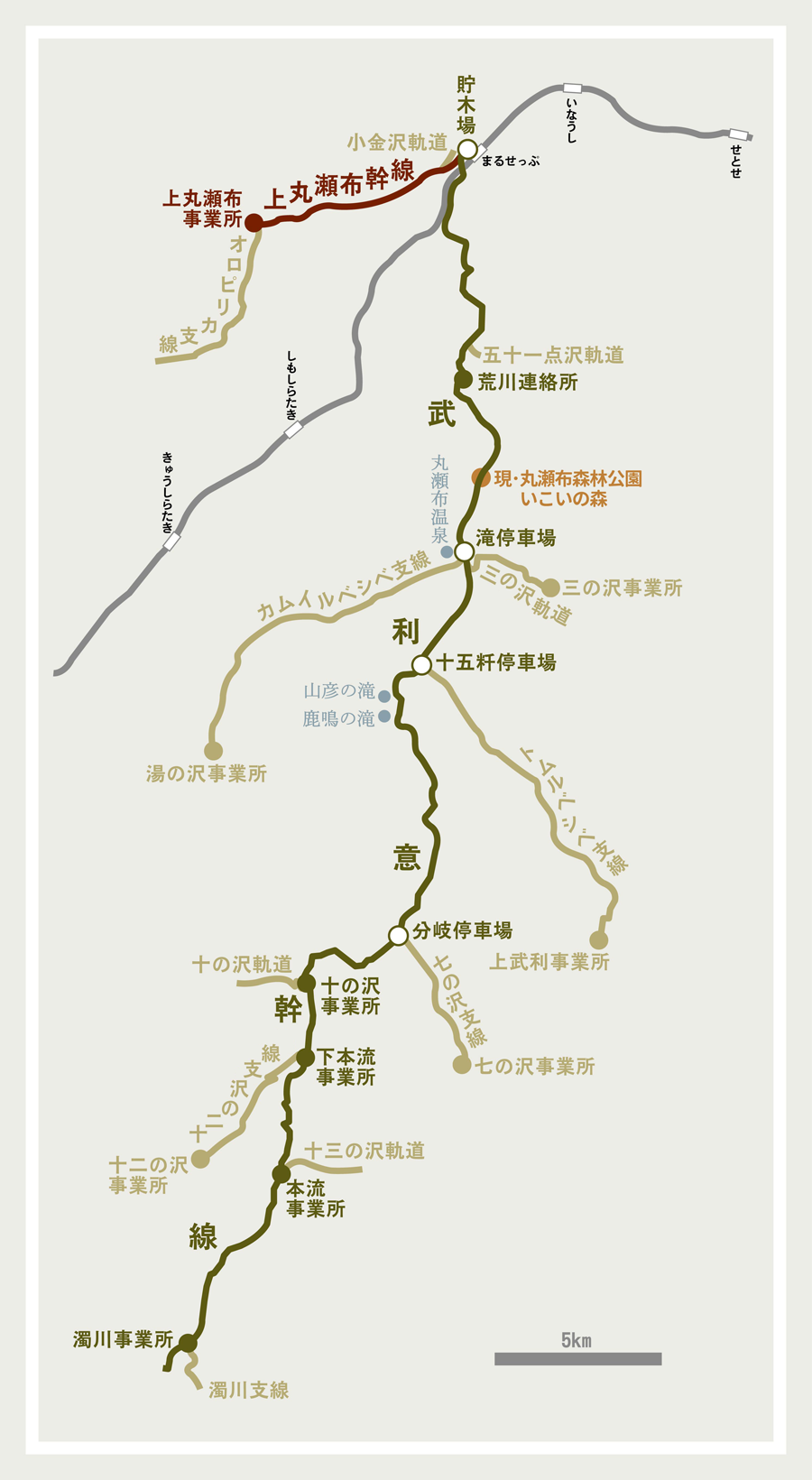
The map of former Murii Forest Railway. Pale orange point is the place of present Maruseppu Forest Park. Gray line is Sekihoku Main Line.

The rails with a gauge of 2 ft 6 in (762 mm) were laid in the forest park west-south of Engaru. In 1980, former Maruseppu town office (present Maruseppu branch office of Engaru town office) laid this railway on the site of a part of Murii Forest Railway (Murii Shinrin Tetsudō, 武利意森林鉄道) line with construction of forest park. In addition to the narrow-gauge railway there is the Maruseppu local history museum, the Maruseppu insects museum, the Maruseppu thermal spring "Yamabiko" and a campsite.

== Rail vehicles ==
=== Steam locomotives ===
==== Amemiya 21-go ====
The historic eleven-ton steam locomotive "Amemiya 21-go" (Amemiya Njūichi gō, the 18-series Murii Forest Railway steam locomotive No. 21) was built in 1928 by Amemiya Manufacturing Co. Ltd. It was formerly used on the Murii Forest Railway in Maruseppu. It was listed as Hokkaido heritage on October 22, 2004 and is now^{(2018)} in working order from the last part of April to the last part of October.

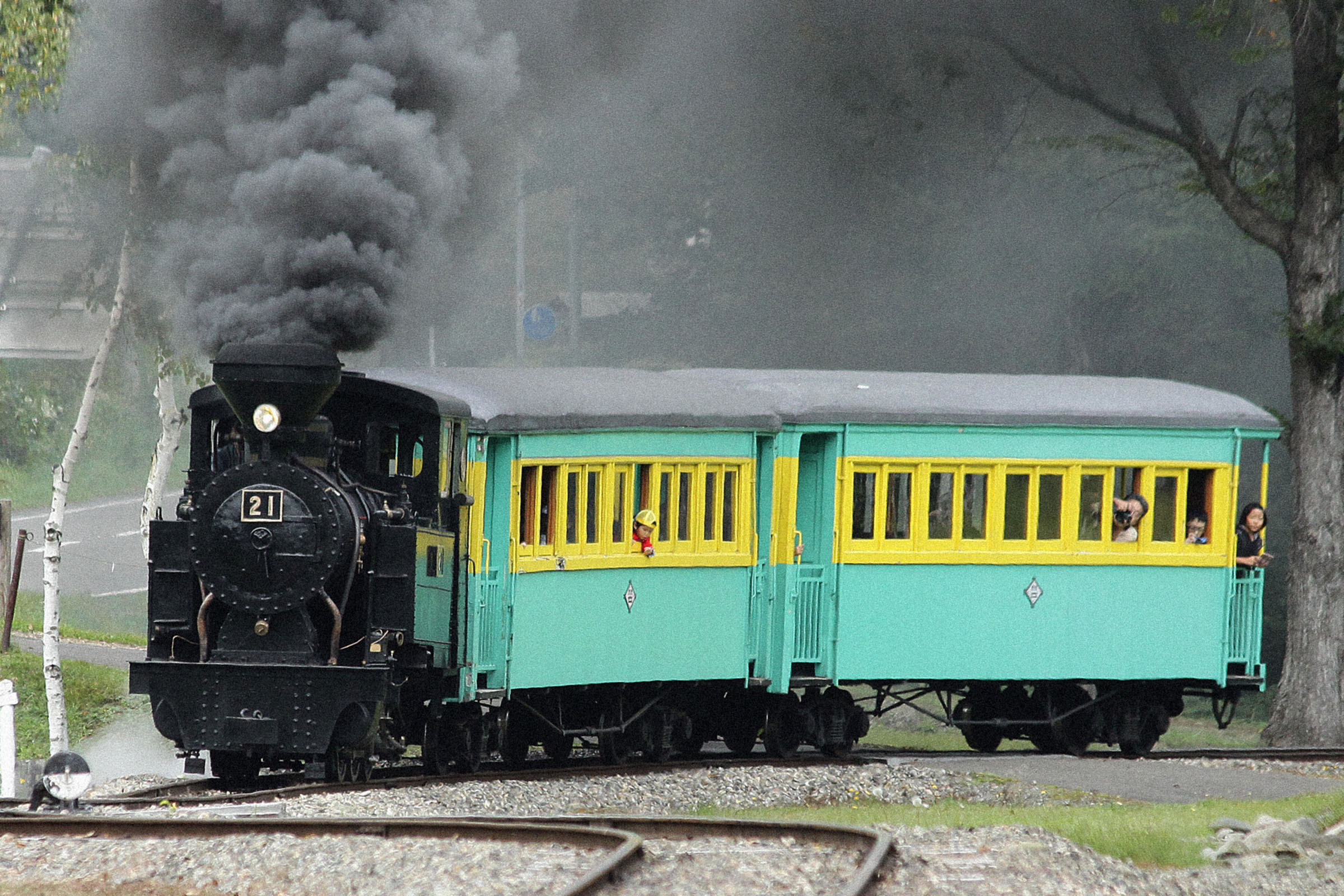
Steam locomotive Amemiya 21-go with wooden coaches of ex Ikasa Railway

Amemiya Manufacturing (Amemiya Seisakujo, 雨宮製作所) was the legendary railway vehicles manufacturer in Tokyo. It was established in 1907 by Keijirō Amemiya (1846 – 1911) who was the owner of Dai-nippon Kidō Company what had the 8 local light railways in Japan. Amemiya Manufacturing had made many small steam locomotives, tram cars, electric cars, petrol engine cars, coaches and wagons private local railways in Japan. But it became bankrupt in 1931, during the Great Depression. In 21st century, Amemiya 21-go is the sole product of Amemiya Manufacturing to be able to work on the rail.

Amemiya 21-go is called the first completed version of small industrial steam locomotive made in Japan. Over the post-war, many local locomotive manufacturers in Japan followed the structure of it.

Murii Forest Railway had 84 km max-length lines around the Maruseppu Station from 1928 until 1963. It was operated by Hokkaido Prefectural Agency of Home Ministry (1928-1947), National Forestry Bureau of Ministry of Agriculture and Forestry (1947-1949) and National Forestry Agency of Ministry of Agriculture, Forestry and Fisheries (1949-1963).

==== E103 ====
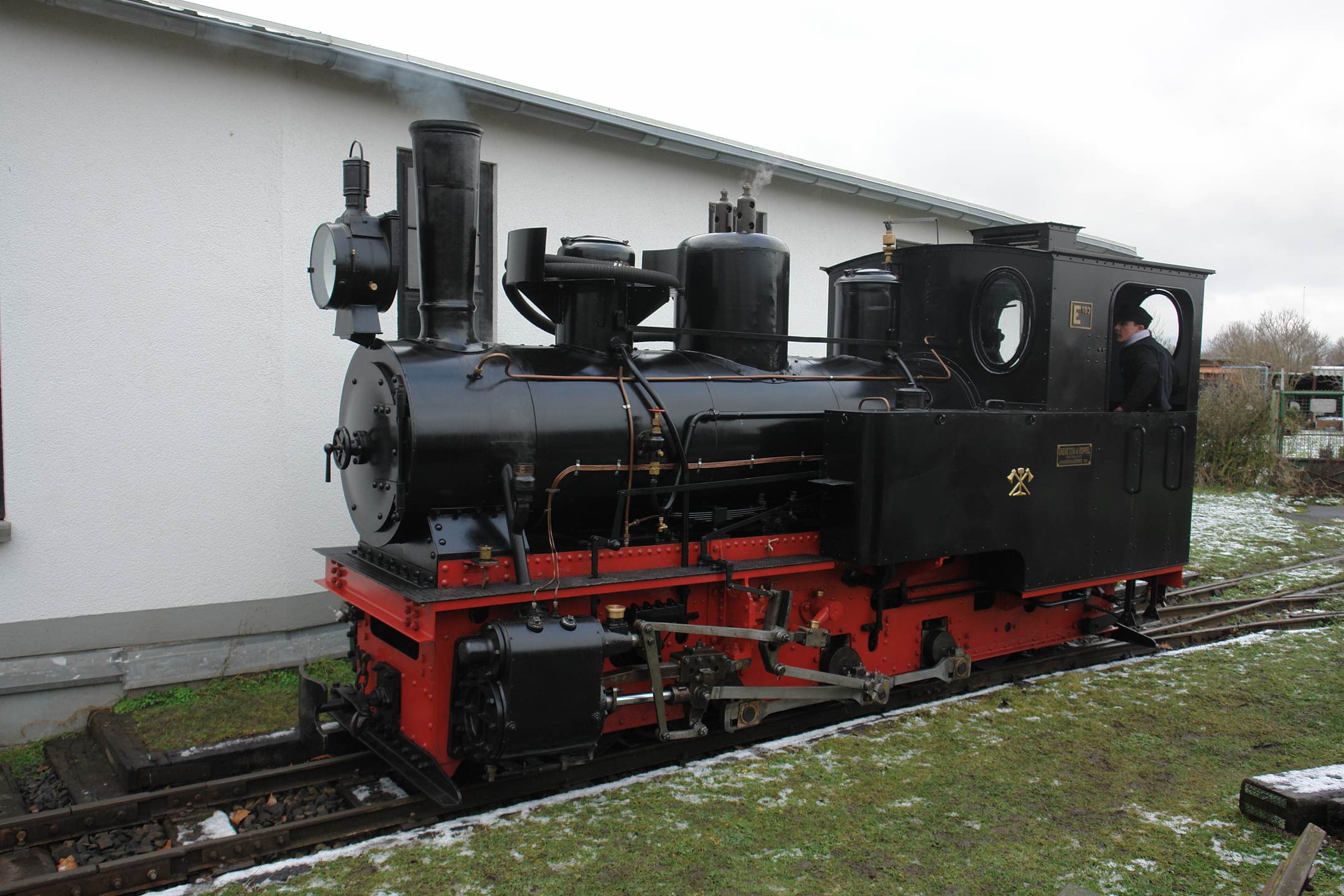
Steam locomotive E103 (Frankfurter Feldbahnmuseum, 2015)

Earlier, the E103 steam locomotive of the E-Class Imperial Japanese Army Railways and Shipping Section what was manufactured by Orenstein & Koppel was exhibited there in a non-operational condition. After World War II, It was acquired by Seibu Railway and was used on gravel-digging line of Ahina Station in Kawagoe, Saitama Prefecture. After Ahina Station was abolished, it had been exhibited in the amusement park of Seibu Railway, and came to Maruseppu in 1990. In 2002, it was transferred to Frankfurter Feldbahnmuseum in Frankfurt am Main, Germany.

==== 532 ====
The 525-series Seibu steam locomotive 532 was manufactured by Orenstein & Koppel in Germany in 1928. It was imported to Japan by the Seibu Railway in 1973, after being used by a Taiwanese sugar factory and used on the Seibu Yamaguchi Line from 1977 to 1984. After their track had been regauged, it came in October 1993 with four wooden coaches of Seibu type 31 (They had been used by Ikasa Railway) to Maruseppu forest park railway. It has been stored in a non-functional state in the engine shed and have not worked on Maruseppu, not even once.

=== Diesel locomotive ===
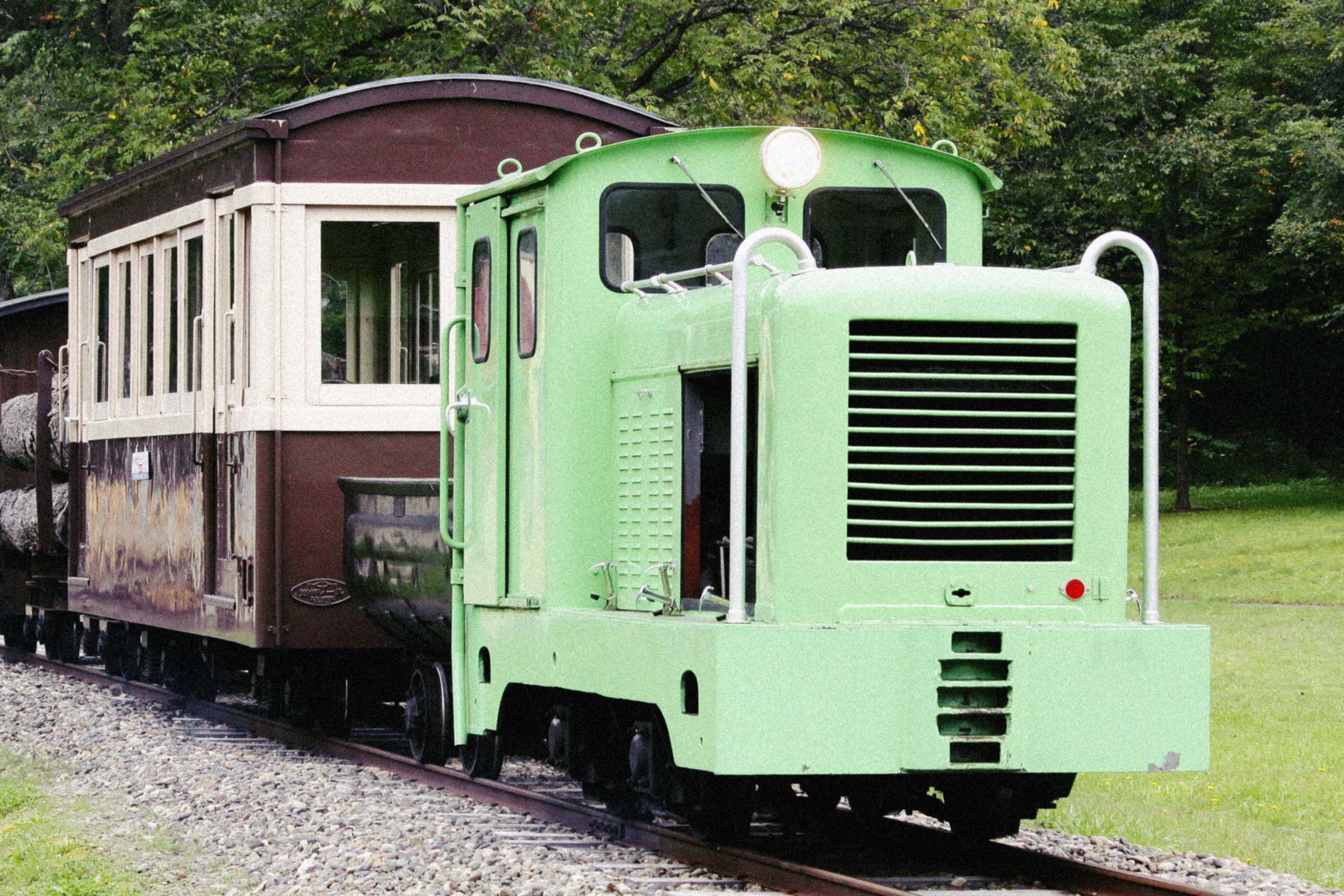
Diesel locomotive ex Tsurui Municipal Railway

A six-ton diesel locomotive operates on the line. It was manufactured by Un'yu Industry Co. in Sapporo in 1959 and used the Tsurui Municipal Railway (Tsurui Village-operated Railway; Tsurui Son'ei Kidō, 鶴居村営軌道; Shin-Fuji - Naka-Setsuri : 28.8 km, Shimo-Hororo - Shin-Hororo : 19.3 km; It was opened in 1929.) in Kushiro Subprefecture. After it was abolished in 1967, the locomotive had been used until 1989 in a plant in the city of Kushiro. Maruseppu town acquired it in 1995 and restored by Sapporo Transport Machinery (Sapporo) in 1996.

== Coaches ==
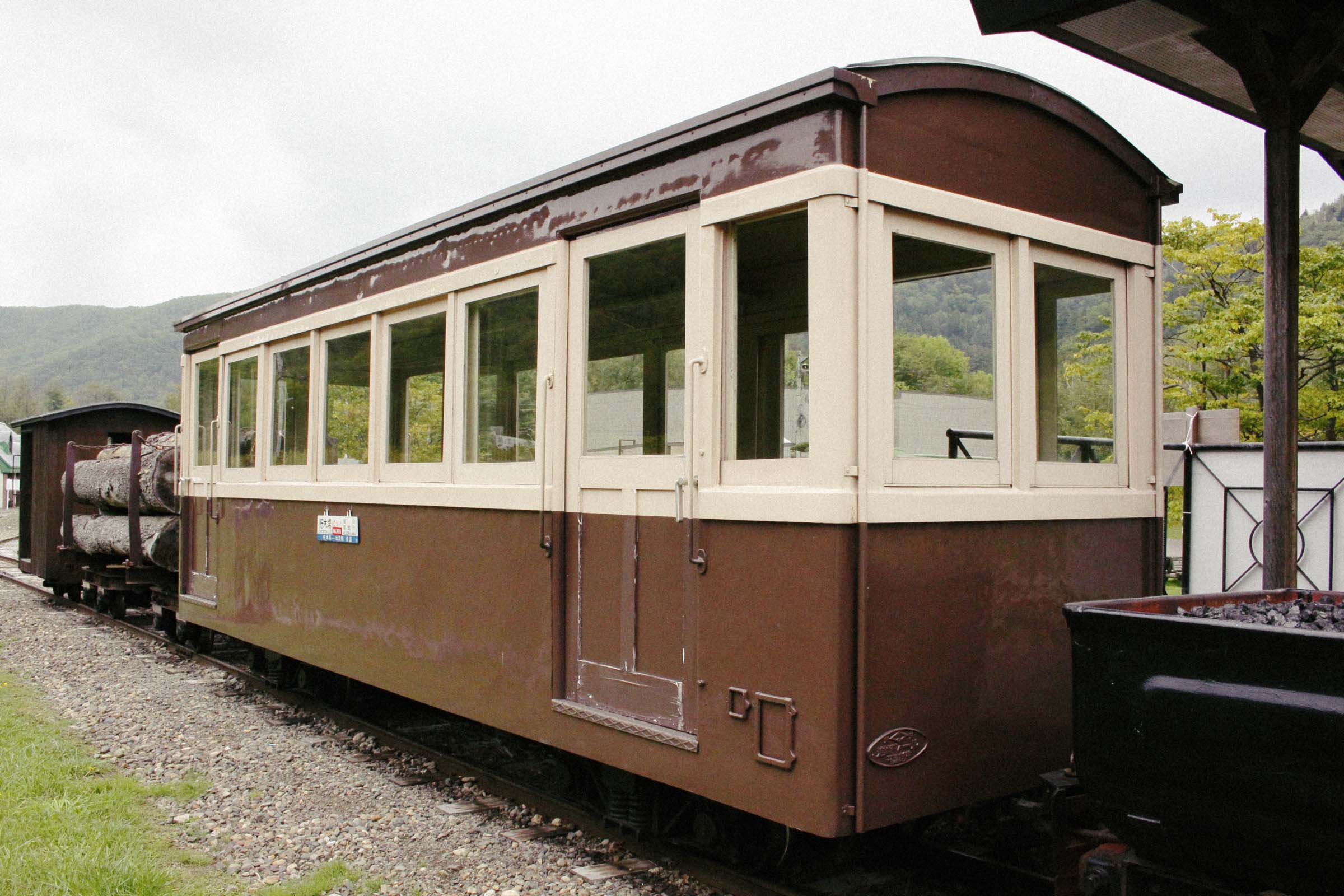
Small-size coach for National Forestry Agency

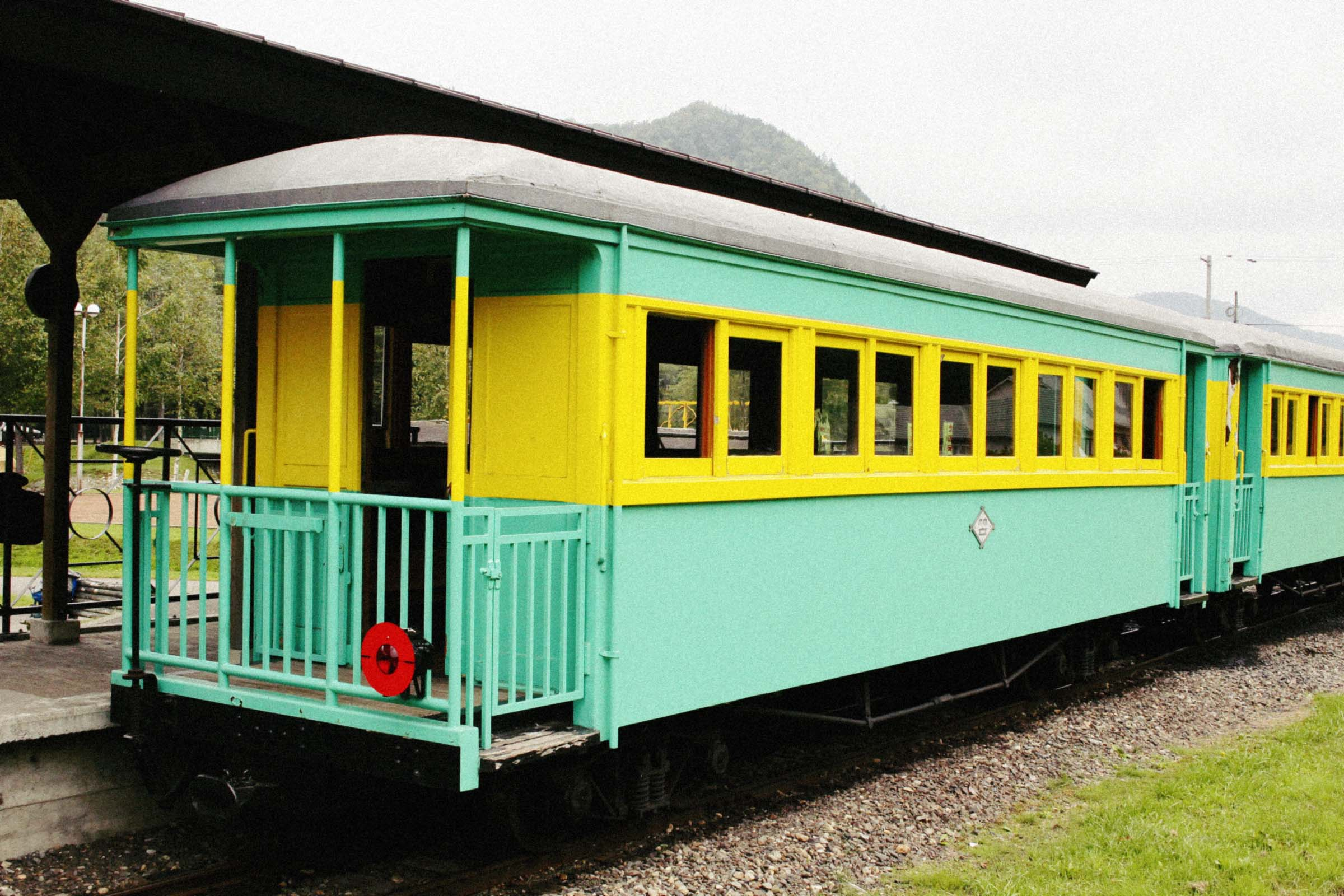
Wooden coach Hoha 13 ex Ikasa Railway

=== Small-size coach for forest railway of National Forestry Agency ===
The small-size coach for forest railway was made by Iwasaki Rail Industry Co. in 1956. Iwasaki Rail Industry was a company made many coaches and wagons forest railways in Japan. At first, it was used on a forest railway of Kitami Regional Forestry Bureau in Hokkaido. After that it was transferred to Ōtaki Forest Railway of Agematsu Forestry Transport Station, Nagano Regional Forestry Bureau in Nagano Prefecture and was used until 1975. Maruseppu town acquired it before Amemiya 21-go began to work in Maruseppu Forest Park.

=== Ikasa Railway's wooden coaches, Hoha 13, Hoha 14, Hoha 18, Hoha 19 ===
Former Ikasa Railway's wooden coaches were made by Nippon Sharyo Co. in 1925. Hoha 13 and Hoha 14 were used by Ikasa Railway (Ikasa Tetsudō, 井笠鉄道; Kasaoka - Ibara - Kannabe; period of railway business 1913–1971; line length until 1967: 33.0 km; track gauge: 762 mm; non-electrified)(not to be confused with Ibara Railway in the west-south of Okayama Prefecture). Hoha 18 and Hoha 19 were used by Ryōbi Light Railway connected Ikasa Railway line, after that Ikasa Railway acquired them when it purchased Jinkō Railway renamed from Ryōbi Light Railway in 1940.

On the named rule of Ikasa Railway, "Ho" meant bogie car and "Ha" meant 3rd class coach.

After Ikasa Railway abolished its railway business, Seibu Railway bought them with other coaches and took renumbering type 31 (Hoha 13 = No. 38, Hoha 14 = No. 39, Hoha 18 = No. 35, Hoha 19 = No. 36). These coaches were used on Seibu Yamaguchi Line until 1984. Maruseppu town acquired them with Steam locomotive 532 in 1993. In 1995, Hoha 13 and Hoha 19 were restored to use in forest park. These 2 coaches don't have any marking on their bodies, and the coach to have 4 poles and fence without end panel at one side of vestibule is Hoha 13. Usually, they are used during busy seasons with Amemiya 21-go.
