= Muroran curry ramen =

Japanese noodle dish

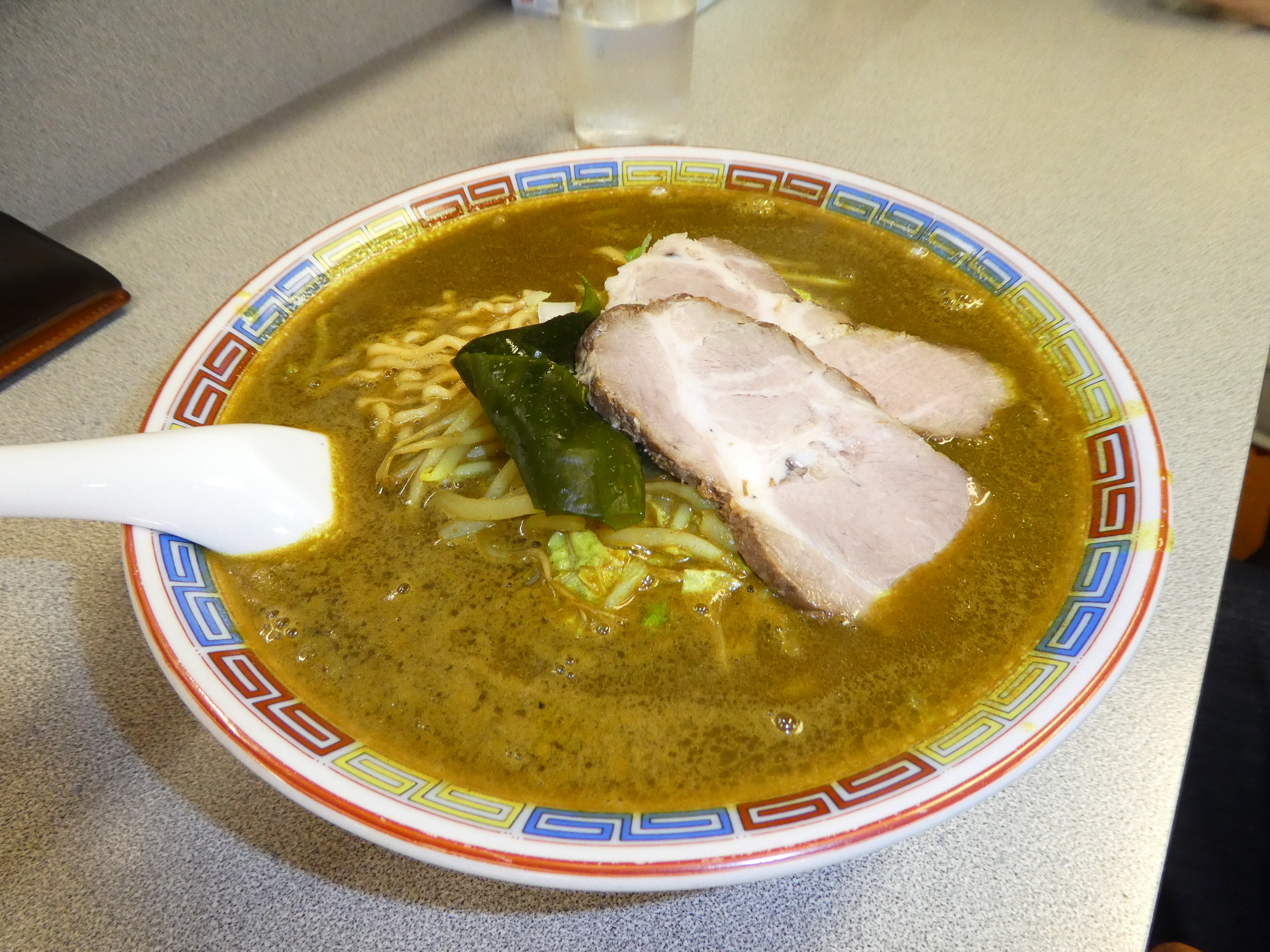
Muroran curry ramen of Ajinodaiō Muroran Main Store in Muroran City, Hokkaido

Muroran curry ramen (室蘭カレーラーメン, Muroran karē rāmen) is a curry-flavored ramen noodle dish provided at many ramen restaurants in the cities of Muroran, Noboribetsu, Date, and Tōyako in Hokkaido, Japan.

== Overview ==
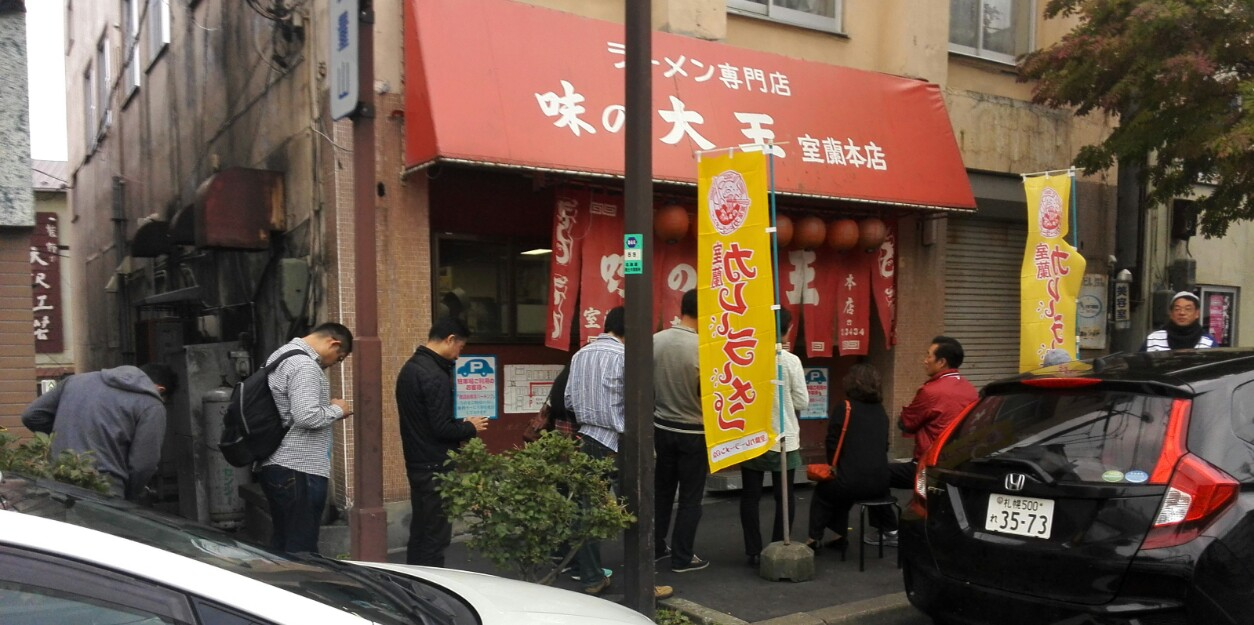
Ajinodaiō ramen restaurant the Muroran main store

Muroran curry ramen was first created in 1965 at Ajinodaiō ramen restaurant in Muroran.

== Characteristics ==
Muroran curry ramen typically contains thick ramen noodles made from Hokkaido wheat. The soup is both sweet and spicy and has a pork bone broth base. The dish is commonly topped with char siu, wakame, and bean sprouts.

== Public relations ==
The Muroran Curry Ramen Group was formed in 2006 to promote the style of ramen.

In 2010, Nissin Food Products launched a Muroran curry ramen instant noodle product nationwide under the supervision of the Muroran Curry Ramen Group.

== New initiatives ==
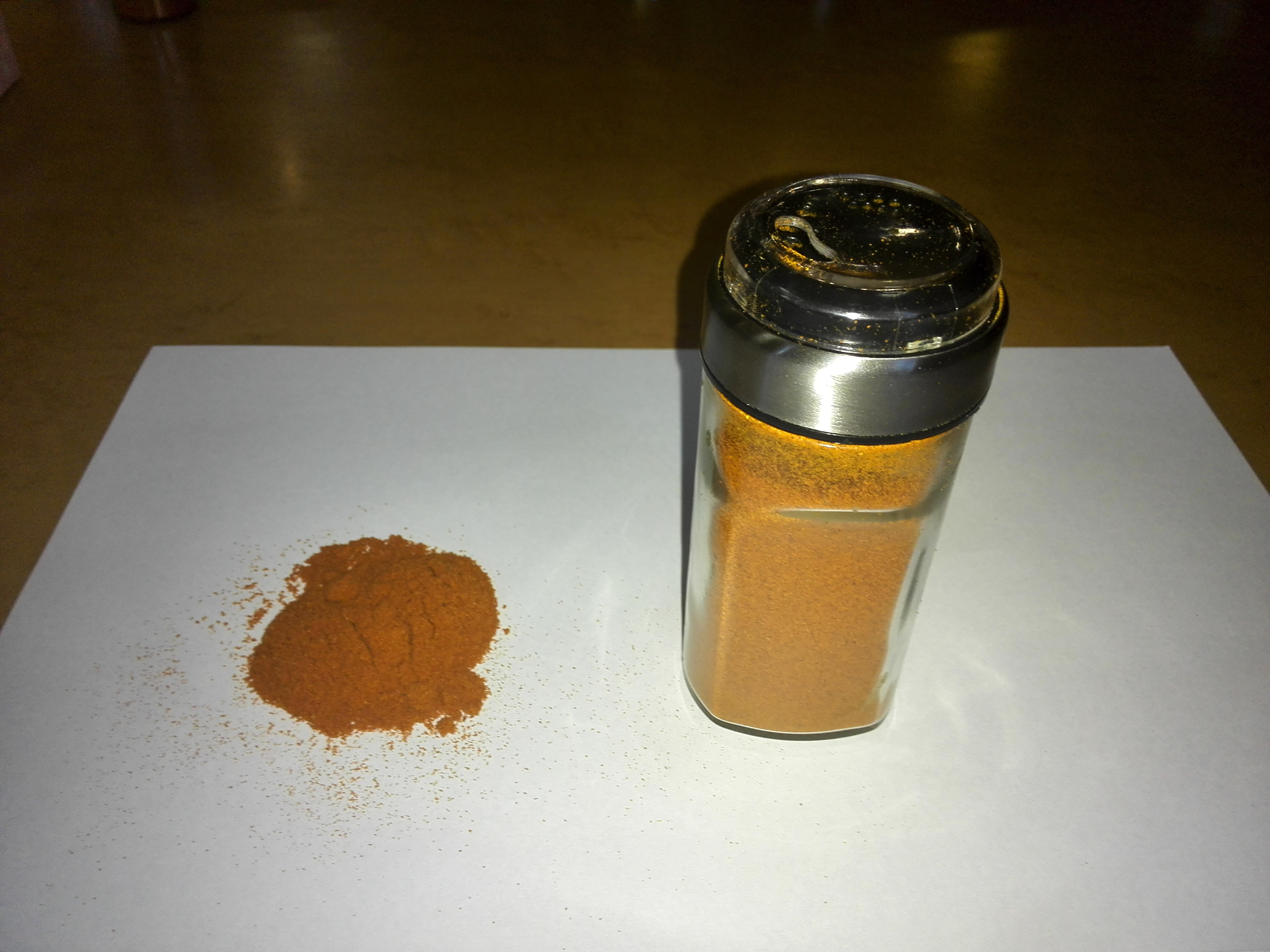
The original spice blend of the Rantantei ramen restaurant for the spicier variety of curry ramen served there

In 2015, Rantantei ramen restaurant in Muroran developed an original spice blend for customers wanting a spicier curry ramen.

== See also ==
- List of ramen dishes
