= Ōmi merchants =

Merchants from Omi, Japan

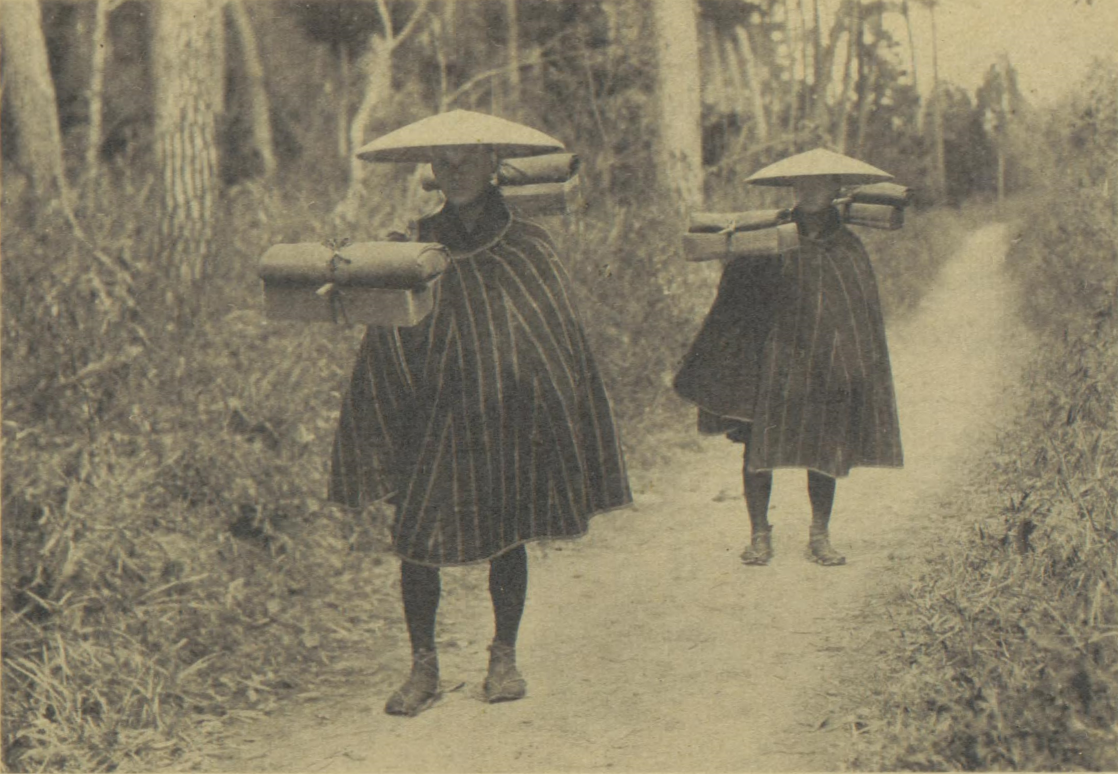
Two Ōmi merchants holding their iconic tenbinbō

Ōmi merchants (Japanese: 近江商人 Ōmi shōnin) refer to merchants who originated from Ōmi (around present-day Shiga prefecture and Lake Biwa), particularly from present-day Ōmihachiman, Hino, and Gokashō. Peddlers by trade, they were known for shouldering a tenbinbō (carrying pole) that carried their goods as they travelled from the Lake Biwa region to as far as Kyushu in the south and Hokkaido in the north.

== History ==
=== Origins ===
Ōmi's geography made it a well-connected location. Located in the middle of Honshu, it was a crossroad between eastern and western Japan. Overland routes such as the Tokaidō and Nakasendō traverse through Ōmi. Lake Biwa also connected ship routes to port cities on the Japan Sea coast, linking the region to coastal routes across the archipelago. Politically, due to its proximity to the ancient capitals of Nara and Kyoto, Ōmi served as an important region as an early point of contact for emissaries and migrants from Korea and China. Due to these factors, Ōmi had a history of commerce and traders who established their own za (guilds) early in the premodern period. Indeed, local authorities throughout the Kamakura and later Azuchi-Momoyama period, such as the Ōmi-born lord Gamō Ujisato, promoted and supported local merchants as a means of increasing their own revenues.

=== The Edo Period ===
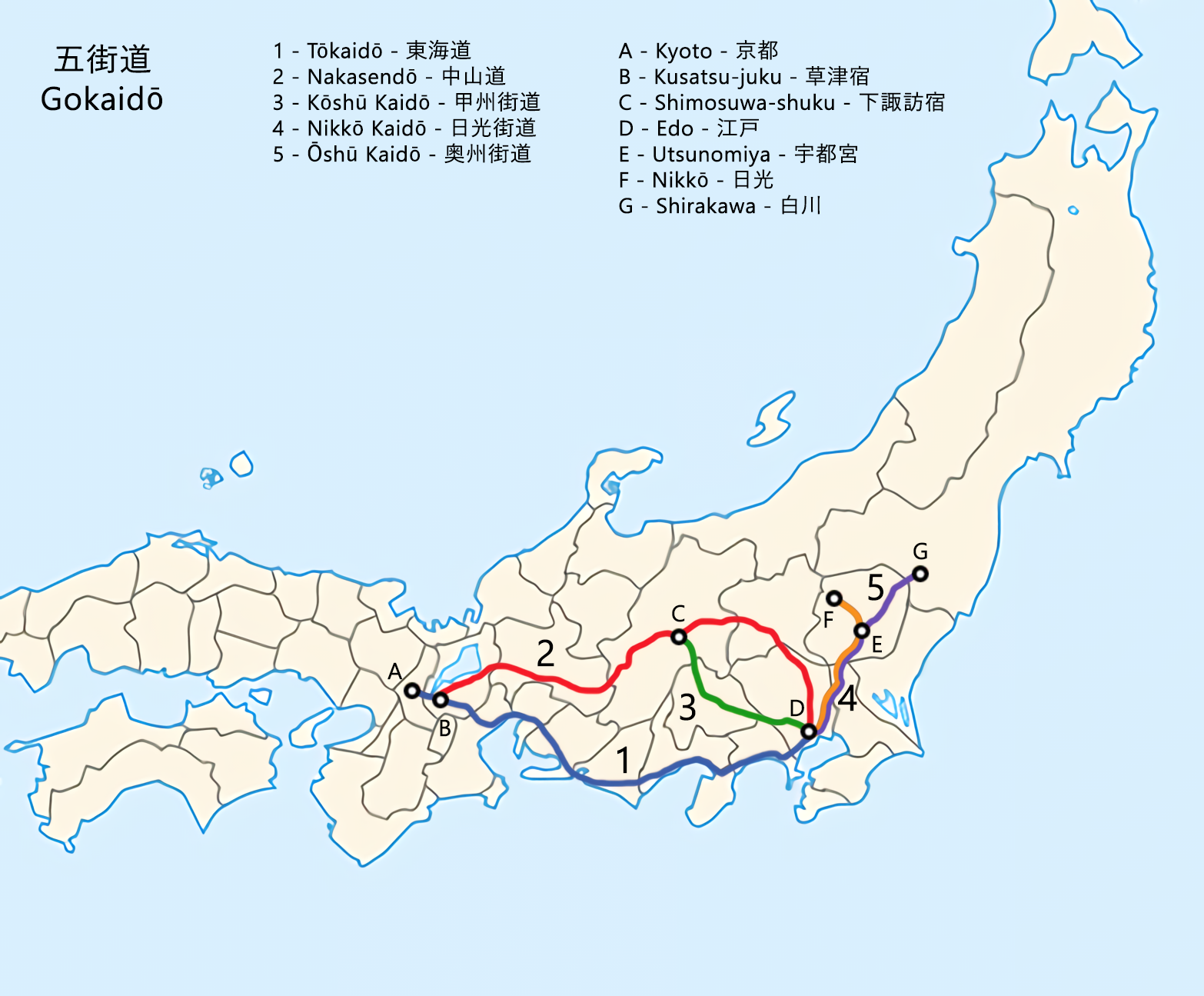
Map of the Gokaidō. The Tokaidō and Nakasendō pass through Ōmi, linking the region to Edo.

Although the Tokugawa shogunate restricted foreign trade through their Sakoku policy, the domestic economy became increasingly commercialised, especially in bustling cities such as the capital, Edo. The relative stability of Tokugawa society, together with the rise of small manufacturing industries in the Kinai region, propelled Ōmi's growth. In this context, Ōmi merchants began to take their manufactured goods to neighbouring, then eventually further domains to trade.

Merchants of Ōmi contributed to the Japanese economy through their networks of trade across the archipelago, connecting and circulating goods from Ezo (present-day Hokkaido) in the north to Kyushu in the south. As peddlers, they would carry local goods such as hemp cloth and nets from Ōmi to distant regions to sell. On the journey back, they would sell commodities of the distant region through various localities, making a profit by the time of their return to Ōmi.

=== Meiji to modern times ===
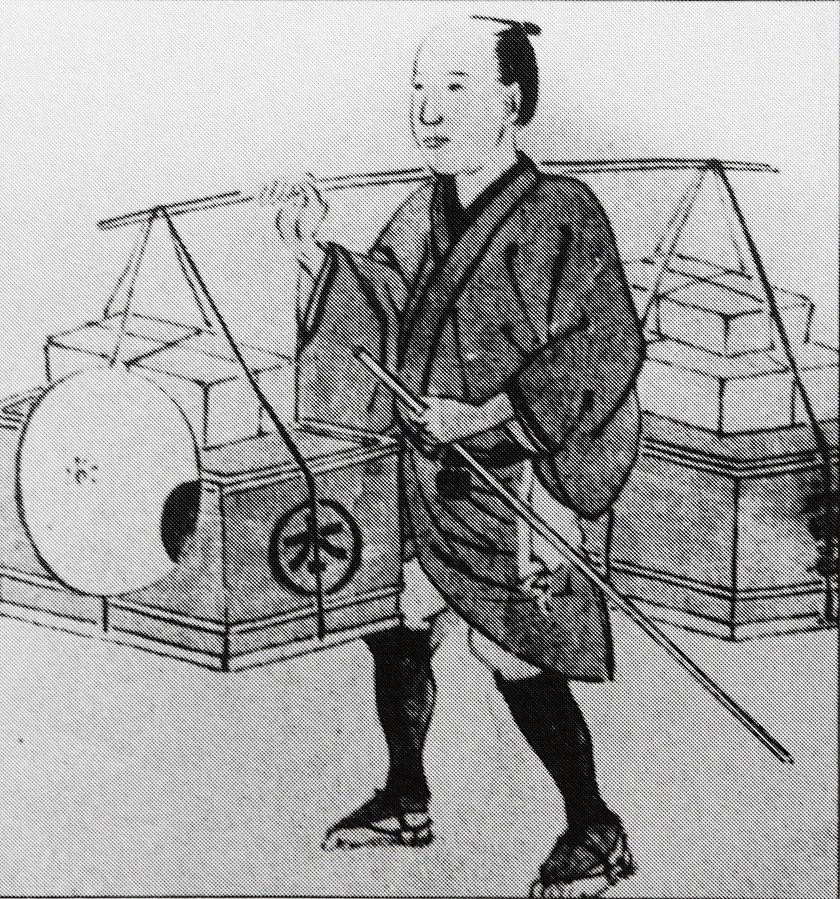
Drawing of the Ōmi merchant Hosoda Zenbē

The Ōmi merchants were believed to have lost their economic footing after the Meiji Restoration as the state allied itself with business conglomerates (Zaibatsu) to drive Japan's industrialization. The domain itself was dissolved as the Meiji state installed the prefectural system to centralise its power over the country. However, many Ōmi merchants continued to dominate certain industries through to the 1930s, such as the textile industry in Kansai. Ōmi merchants also remained active in the economy of Hokkaido where they managed fisheries. Despite the lack of government support, Ōmi merchant families restructured their business operations, often pooling capital together with other Ōmi families to create guild-like joint stock companies resembling European trading companies. By the 1920s, Ōmi merchants in the textile industry were so well organised and powerful that their influence resembled Zaibatsu families.

=== Expansion overseas ===
Many Ōmi merchants expanded their commercial activities abroad, setting up shop and networks as Japan expanded through East Asia. Nakae Katsujirō (1872–1944), for example, expanded his family's clothing business to the Korean peninsula in 1905 when Korea became a Japanese protectorate. By 1919, he had opened shops in five locations, from Busan in the south to Pyongyang in the north.

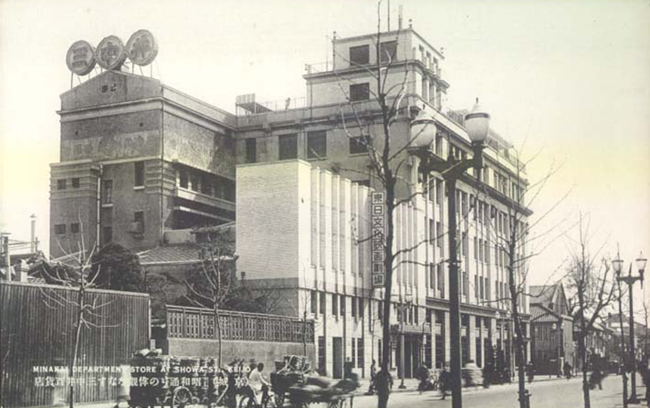
Minakai Department Store in Keijō (present-day Seoul), established by Nakae Katsujirō

Others migrated further, traversing across the Pacific Ocean to reach the shores of North America. In particular, Ōmi merchants formed a community in Vancouver, Canada. The earliest Japanese emigrants to Western Canada arrived in 1884, which included Ōmi migrants. Setting up in the Powell Street area, Ōmi merchants established shops, boardinghouses, and various services to a burgeoning Japanese community. Their commercial activities laid the basis for what eventually became Japantown and Little Tokyo.

== Business philosophy ==
The Ōmi merchants practiced a commercial philosophy called the sanpo-yoshi (三方よし, literally "good for three sides", which in turn refers to "good for the seller, good for the buyer, good for the world"). A heavy emphasis was placed on trust-building as Ōmi merchants had to travel far and maintain relations with distant suppliers and clients. Some people trace certain modern business practices to Ōmi merchant philosophy, such as ideas related to corporate social responsibility and environmentalism.

== Companies with Ōmi heritage ==
A number of successful Japanese businesses have Ōmi merchant heritage, with some having a global presence.

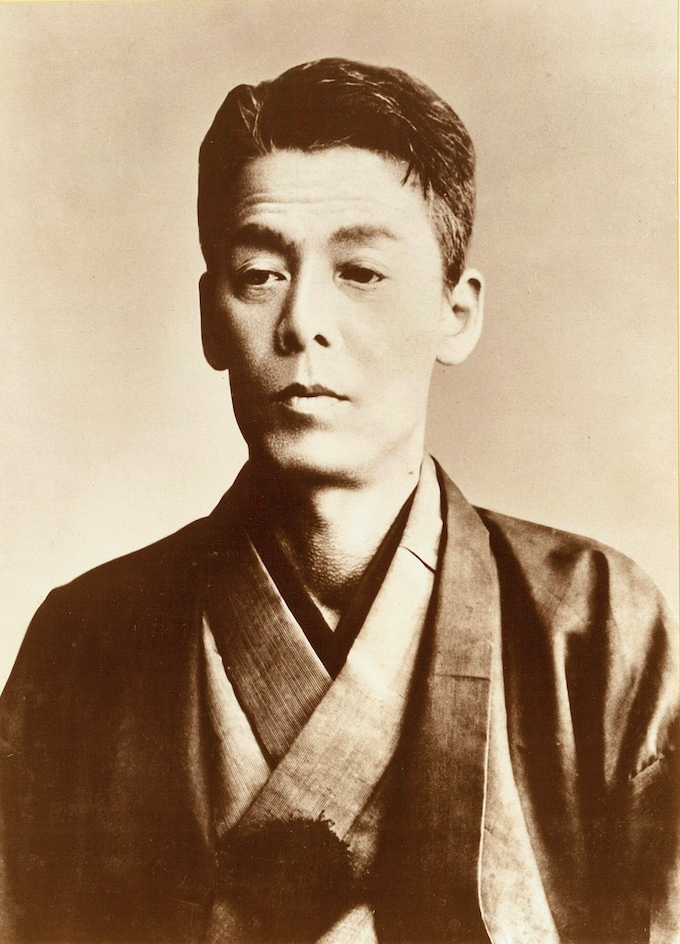
Itō Chūbē, the founder of Itōchū Corporation

Itōchū Corporation was founded by the Ōmi merchant Itō Chūbē. Born in 1842, he set up his own trading company in Ōmi, later expanding across Kansai and Kyushu, amassing a fortune through the production and selling of linen goods. His son, Chūbē II, expanded the business through the colonies of Korea and Manchuria, and even entered the Chinese cotton market. Around this time, in 1921, the Itō family founded Marubeni, their textile wholesale business, in a restructuring plan. The Itō family enterprise would continue to expand, and by 1940, their conglomerate that included Itōchū, Marubeni, and other enterprises, had direct interests across heavy and light industries, ranging from textiles (that they originally developed) to chemicals, steel, and munitions.

Takashimaya was also founded by the Ōmi merchant Iida Shinshichi who originated in Tsuruga (present day Fukui prefecture, north of Lake Biwa), in 1831.
