= Shellfish Museum of Rankoshi =

- 蘭越町貝の館
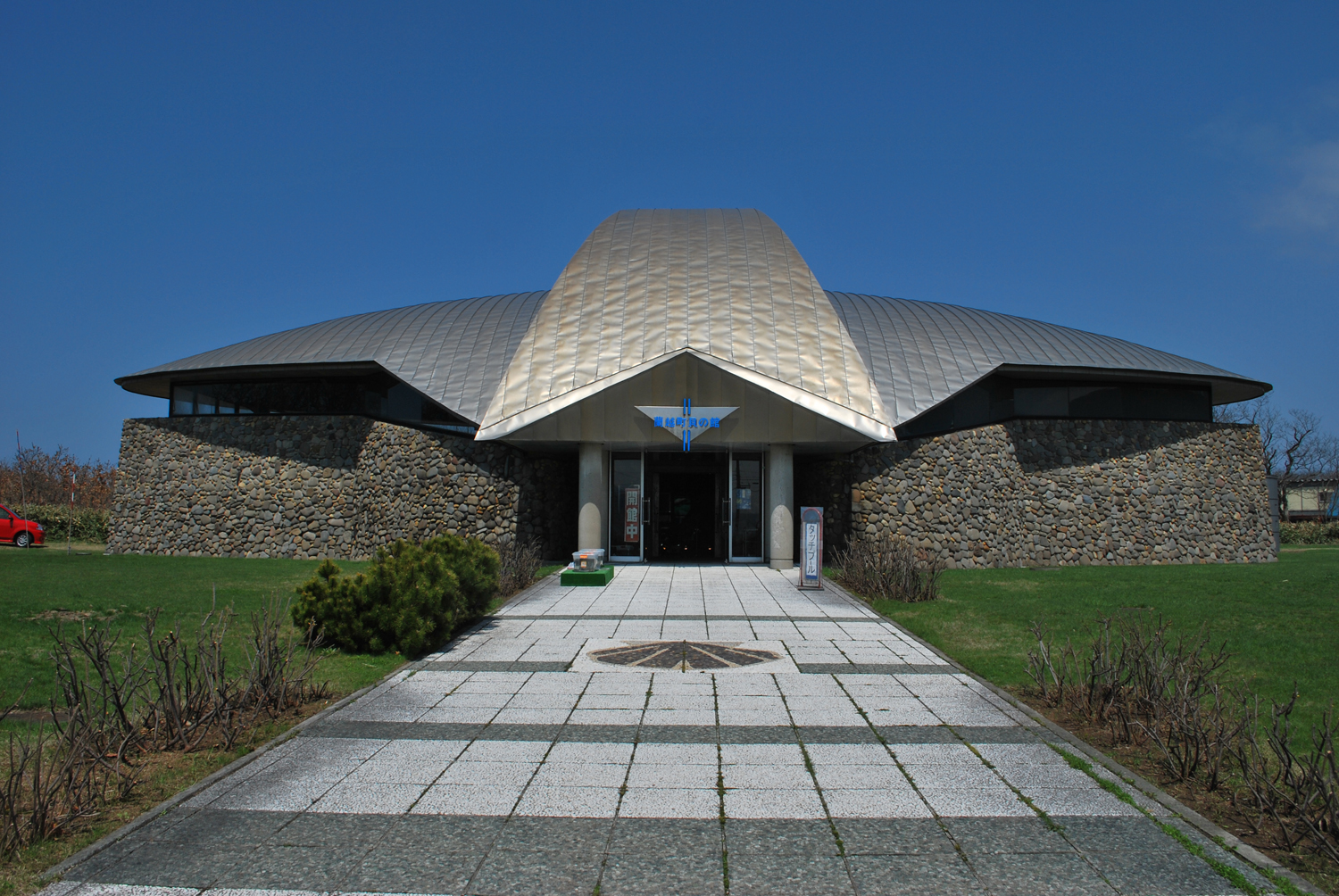
- Interactive map of the Shellfish Museum of Rankoshi area

General information
- Location: 1401 Minato-machi, Rankoshi, Hokkaidō, Japan
- Coordinates: 42°52′51″N 140°22′13″E
- Opened: 29 July 1991

Website
- Official website

The Shellfish Museum of Rankoshi (蘭越町貝の館, Rankoshi-chō Kai no Yakata) is a museum dedicated to the shellfish of the world in Rankoshi, Hokkaidō, Japan. Ammonites and other aquatic molluscs from Hokkaidō's fossil record are also exhibited. Comprising two buildings, the first opened in 1991 and the second in 1994. In 2017, the Shellfish Museum of Rankoshi together with the University of Toyama announced the discovery of a new species of clione.

== See also ==
- Niseko-Shakotan-Otaru Kaigan Quasi-National Park
