= Sōsei River =

River in Sapporo, Hokkaidō, Japan

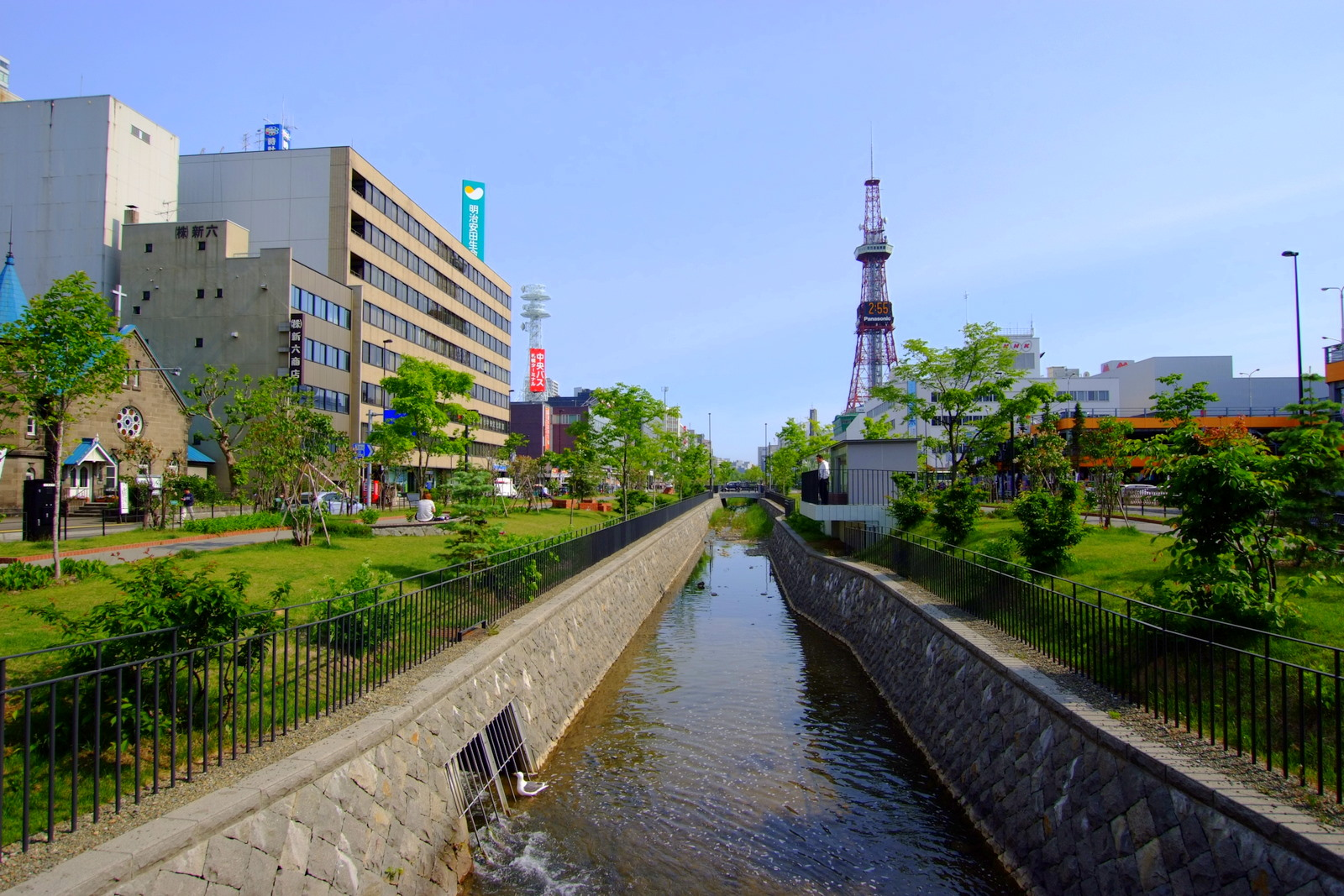

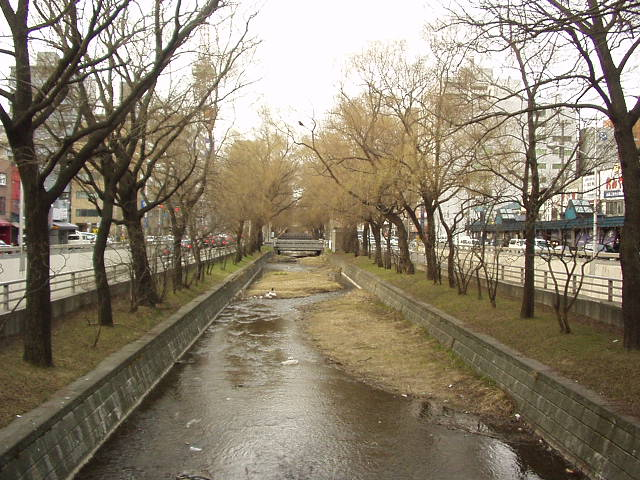
The Sōsei River in 2004, taken from Minami-Sanjo-doori, facing north.

The Sōsei River is a man-made river that runs through the center of Sapporo City, Hokkaidō, Japan. It was built under the supervision of Otomo Kametaro in the late 1860s, and was one of the first things constructed on the city site. When it was built, the river ran in a straight line to the Ishikari River. It is the dividing point between east and west in Sapporo's grid-based address system.
