= Yūbari Coal Mine Museum =

- 夕張市石炭博物館
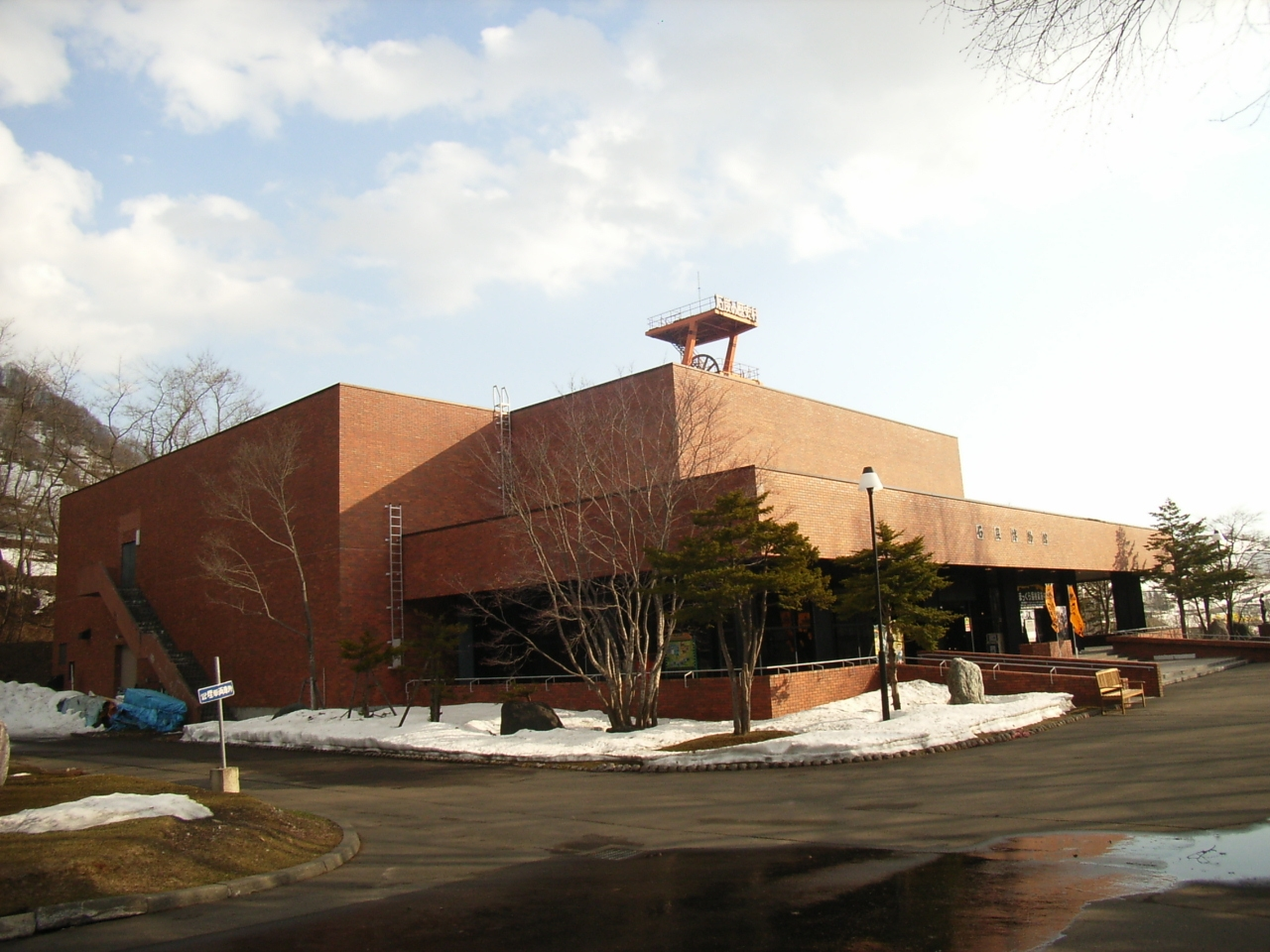
- Interactive map of the Yūbari Coal Mine Museum area

General information
- Location: 7 Takamatsu, Yūbari, Hokkaidō, Japan
- Coordinates: 43°04′06″N 141°59′21″E
- Opened: July 1980

Website
- Official website

Yūbari Coal Mine Museum (夕張市石炭博物館, Yūbari-shi Sekitan Hakubutsukan) opened in Yūbari, Hokkaidō, Japan in 1980. It documents the importance of coal mining to the local economy from the Meiji period to the Shōwa period. The museum is currently closed (October 1, 2017).

== See also ==
- Ishikari coalfield
- Yubari King
