= Yubari King =

Japanese cantaloupe cultivar

Cucumis melo 'Yubari King'
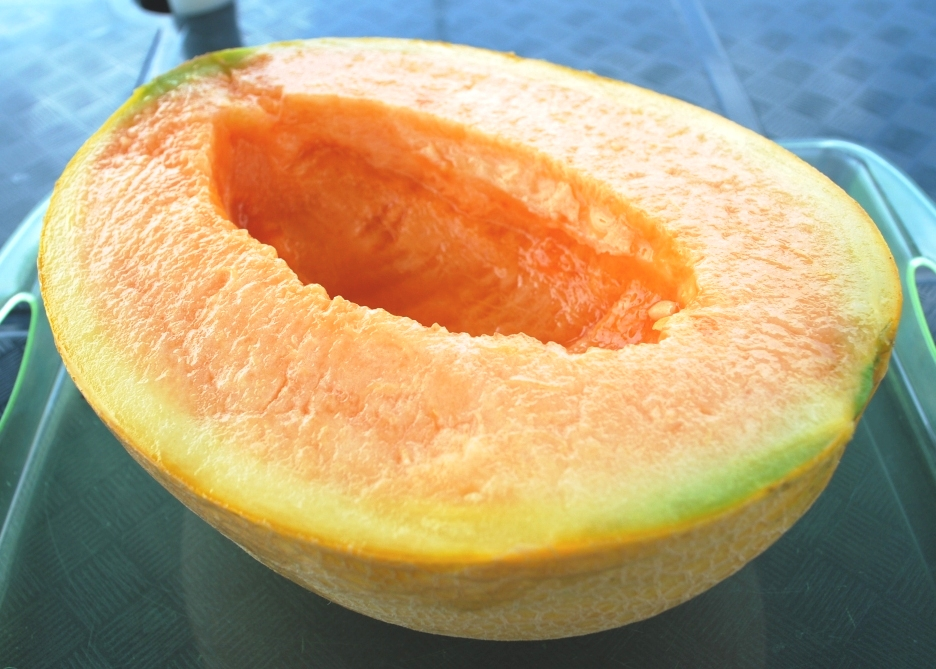
- Section of a fresh Yūbari King melon
- Genus: Cucumis
- Species: C. melo
- Hybrid parentage: Cucumis melo Earl's Favourite × Burpee's "Spicy" Cantaloupe
- Cultivar: 'Yubari King?'
- Origin: Yūbari, Hokkaidō, Japan

The Yubari King (夕張メロン, Yūbari Meron; Yūbari melon) is a cantaloupe cultivar farmed in greenhouses in Yūbari, Hokkaido, a small city near Sapporo.

The Yubari King is a hybrid of two other cantaloupe cultivars: Earl's Favourite and Burpee's "Spicy" Cantaloupe. The hybrid's scientific name is Cucumis melo L. var. reticulatus Naud. cv. Yubari King.

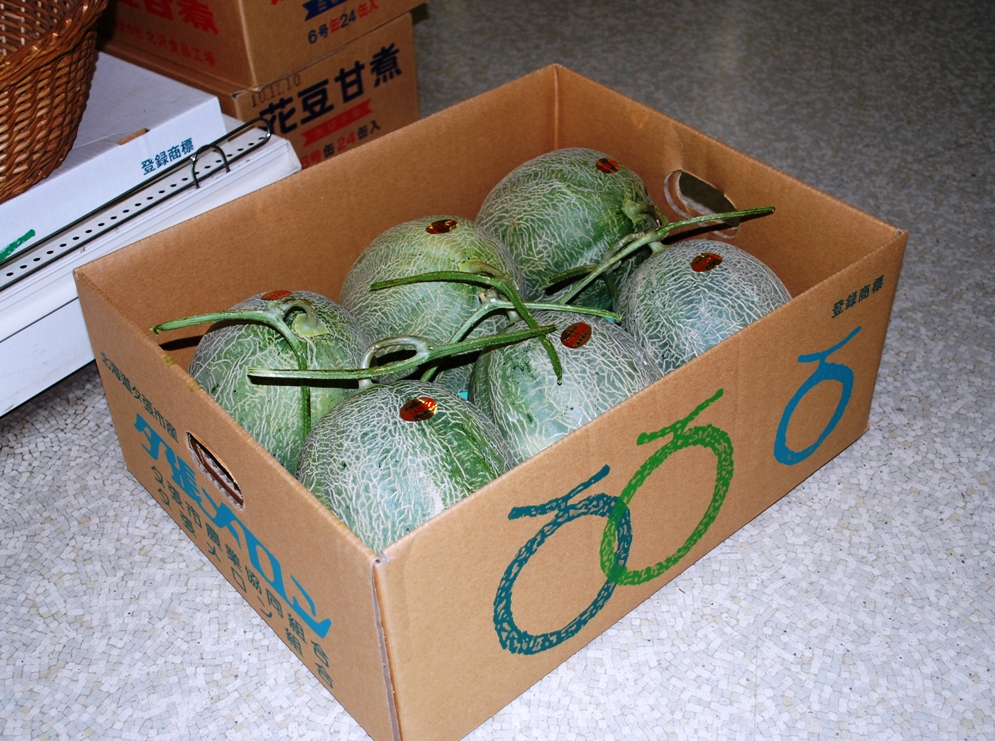
Six Yubari King melons packed in cardboard for transport

A top-grade melon is to be perfectly round and have an exceptionally smooth rind. A portion of the stem, which is snipped with scissors, is left on top for aesthetic appeal. Some Japanese people present Yubari King melons as gifts during Chūgen (中元).

Yubari melons may sell for high prices when first offered at fruit and vegetable auctions each growing season. At an auction in May 2008, two Yubari King melons sold together for ¥2.5 million. In May 2016, Konishi Seika, a fruit and vegetable market in Amagasaki, bought a pair of Yubari King melons at auction with a winning bid of ¥3 million. In May 2019, the Tokyo-based company Pokka bought a pair of Yubari melons at auction for ¥5 million. In May 2026, produce wholesale company Futami Seika bought two Yubari King melons at an auction in Sapporo for ¥5.8 million, and resold the melons to Keio Store.
