= Keijiro Amemiya =

Amemiya Keijiro
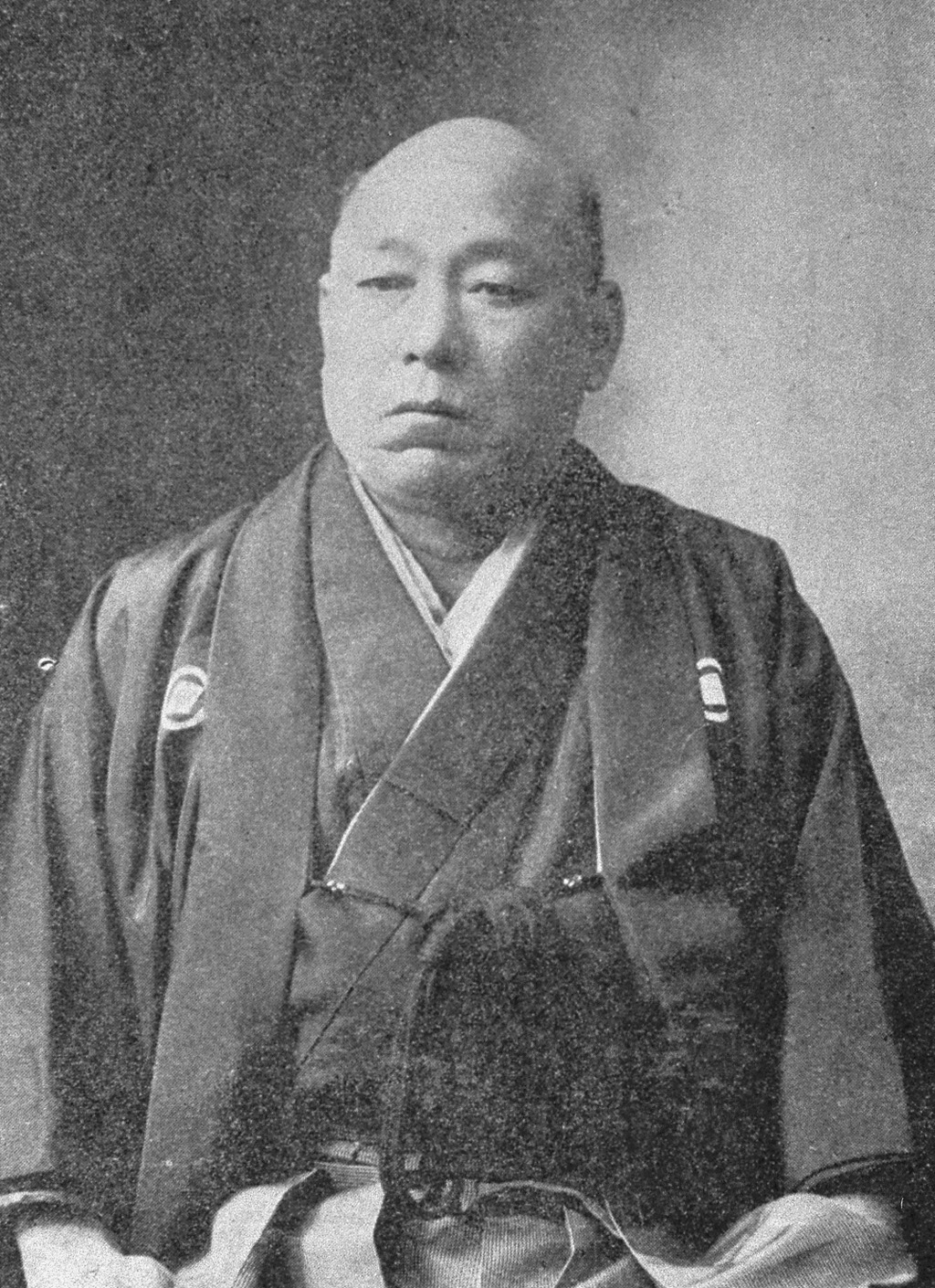
- Born: October 24, 1846
- Died: January 20, 1911 (aged 64)

Amemiya Keijiro (Japanese 雨宮 敬次郎 Amemiya Keijiro:, October 24, 1846 – January 20, 1911) was a Japanese entrepreneur, financier, and investor. One of the leaders of the regional Koshu Zaibatsu, a group of Koshu merchants who banded together to engage in business. His nickname was "king of speculators" (Japanese: 投機界の魔王) and "the railroad king of the Meiji era" (Japanese: 明治の鉄道王).

== Biography ==
Amemiya Keijiro was born on October 24, 1846, in the village of Ushioku, Kai Province, into the family of a feudal lord.

Keijiro began his business with street trading, which proved profitable. Later he engaged in financial transactions, in particular currency exchange, silver and gold.

He moved to Yokohama in the early 1870s and tried to work in the market for raw silk, Western silver, and silkworms. From November 1876 to June 1877, he travelled abroad to the United States and Europe. After that, he decided to invest in the fields of social infrastructure, which were profitable in the western countries, such as railroads, iron manufacturing, and water supply.

In 1879, he established a flour mill in Fukagawa, Tokyo, which became a success. The success of the steam-powered flour mill led him to enter the business world in earnest.

In 1883, he undertook a development project in Karuizawa based on his experience in the U.S., where he linked agriculture and industry. The land he cultivated at that time still remains today as "Amamiya Shinden" in Nagakura, Karuizawa-cho, Kitasaku-gun, Nagano Prefecture.

In 1884, he stopped trading at the market and moved to Tokyo. Around this time, the flour milling business he had started earlier developed, and in 1886 (Meiji 19), he acquired a government-owned flour mill in Kuramae, Tokyo, and in the following year (1887), he changed the company name to Limited Liability Nippon Flour Milling Company, mainly for the production of flour for military use. This company became Nippon Flour Milling in September 1896, and is now the leading flour mill company in Japan.

In 1888, he made a large profit by speculating in the Koumu Railway, which connected Shinjuku and Hachioji and was the predecessor of the Chuo Main Line, and when the stock price slumped due to internal company conflicts, he bought it up and became a director of the company. Amamiya conceived of the "Yamanashi Railway Plan", which would extend the Koumu Railway westward to connect Hachioji and Kofu, and was at odds with Ippei Wakao, who had conceived of the "Koshin Railway Plan".

In 1891, he became a director of the Kawagoe Railway (now Seibu Kokubunji Line). In the same year, he was awarded the first Medal of Honor, and in 1892, he founded Nippon Cast Iron Company and delivered iron pipes for water supply to the then city of Tokyo. However, in 1894, a problem of delayed delivery arose, and Keijiro was criminally prosecuted.

In 1893, he became a director of the Hokkaido Colliery and Railway Company and initiator of the Keikyu Corporation. In 1894, he built the Toso Jinkansha Railway and developed Senjin Tetsuyama in Iwate Prefecture.

In 1903, he became chairman of the Tokyo Commodity Exchange. In the same year, he became chairman of the Tokyo Toden and entered the electric power business as well.

In 1911, he died at the age of 64 at his villa in Sakuragaoka, Atami, Shizuoka Prefecture (now Umezonocho, Atami City). There is a monument to the place of his death in the present Atami Plum Garden.
