= List of Natural Monuments of Japan (Nara) =

This list is of the Natural Monuments of Japan within the Prefecture of Nara.

== National Natural Monuments ==
As of 1 April 2021, twenty-four Natural Monuments have been designated, including three *Special Natural Monuments; Dorohatchō spans the prefectural borders with Mie and Wakayama.

Monument	Municipality	Comments	Image	Coordinates	Type	Ref.
*Japanese serow Capricornis crispus カモシカ; Kamoshika		designated across twenty-nine prefectures			1.1	
*Japanese giant salamander Andrias japonicus オオサンショウウオ; Õsanshōuo		designated across eighteen prefectures			1.2	
*Kasugayama Primeval Forest 春日山原始林; Kasuga-yama genshi-rin	Nara	no tree-felling or hunting has been permitted since 841; inscribed on the UNESCO World Heritage List as one of the Historic Monuments of Ancient Nara		34°40′56″N 135°51′30″E	2.2	
Deer in Nara 奈良のシカ; Nara no shika	Nara				1.3	
Japanese dormouse Glirulus japonicus ヤマネ; Yamane		found in Honshū, Shikoku, and Kyūshū			1.1	
Moore's Cupid; Shijimia moorei ゴイシツバメシジミ; Goishitsubame-shijimi					1.1	
Arhopala ganesa Habitat ルーミスシジミ生息地; Rūmisu-shijimi seisokuchi	Nara			34°41′19″N 135°51′50″E	1.2	
Verdure on Mount Imo 妹山樹叢; Imo-yama jusō	Yoshino			34°23′38″N 135°52′15″E	2.1	
Siebold's magnolia Habitat; Magnolia sieboldii ssp. japonica オオヤマレンゲ自生地 ōyamarenge jiseichi	Tenkawa, Gojō			34°10′26″N 135°54′15″E	2.2	
Clematis patens Habitat カザグルマ自生地; Kazaguruma jiseichi	Uda			34°29′34″N 135°55′57″E	2.11	
Asian Bayberry Forest in the Precinct of Kasuga Jinja; Nageia nagi 春日神社境内ナギ樹林; Kasuga Jinja keidai nagi ju-rin	Nara			34°40′53″N 135°50′56″E	2.2	
Sannokō River Japanese Douglas-fir Primeval Forest; Pseudotsuga japonica 三ノ公川トガサワラ原始林; Sannokō-gawa togasawara genshi-rin	Kawakami			34°16′02″N 136°04′20″E	2.2	
Lysionotus pauciflorus Communities シシンラン群落; Shishinran gunraku	Kamikitayama			34°09′00″N 136°00′41″E	2.9	
Chisoku-in Naranoyaezakura; Prunus verecunda 'Antiqua' 知足院ナラノヤエザクラ; Chisokuin naranoyaezakura	Nara			34°41′33″N 135°50′25″E	2.1	
Niukawakami Jinja Myrsine stolonifera Habitat 丹生川上中社のツルマンリョウ自生地; Niukawakami nakasha no tsurumanryō jiseichi	Higashiyoshino			34°23′26″N 135°59′12″E	2.2,10	
Hayama Lily of the Valley Communities; Convallaria keiskei 吐山スズラン群落; Hayama suzuran gunraku	Nara			34°33′42″N 135°57′21″E	2.10	
Byōbu-iwa, Kabuto-iwa, and Yoroi-iwa 屏風岩、兜岩および鎧岩; Byōbu-iwa, Kabuto-iwa oyobi Yoroi-iwa	Soni			34°31′39″N 136°07′26″E		
Futami Giant Muku Tree; Aphananthe aspera 二見の大ムク; Futami no ōmuku	Gojō			34°20′39″N 135°41′12″E	2.1	
Mount Bukkyō Primeval Forest 仏経嶽原始林; Bukkyōgatake genshi-rin	Kamikitayama, Tenkawa			34°10′21″N 135°54′33″E	2.2	
Mukō Lily of the Valley Communities; Convallaria keiskei 向淵スズラン群落; Mukō suzuran gunraku	Uda			34°34′39″N 135°58′52″E	2.10	
Murō Mountain Temperate Fern Communities; Diplaziopsis cavaleriana, Diplazium okudairae, Dryopteris maximowicziana, Pteris terminalis 室生山暖地性シダ群落; Murō-zan danchisei shida gunraku	Uda			34°32′23″N 136°02′24″E		
Yatsubusa Sugi; Cryptomeria japonica 八ツ房スギ; Yatsubusa-sugi	Uda			34°26′36″N 135°58′36″E	2.1	
Mount Yoki Subtropical Forest 与喜山暖帯林; Yoki-san dantai-rin	Sakurai			34°32′18″N 135°54′42″E	2.1	
Dorohatchō 瀞八丁; Õsanshōuo	Totsukawa	designation includes areas of Kumano in Mie Prefecture and Shingū in Wakayama Prefecture; also a Special Place of Scenic Beauty		33°54′02″N 135°53′10″E		

April 2021

== Prefectural Natural Monuments ==
As of 1 May 2020, sixty-one Natural Monuments have been designated at a prefectural level.

Monument	Municipality	Comments	Image	Coordinates	Type	Ref.
Ischikauia in Kagami-ike at Tōdai-ji; Ischikauia steenackeri 東大寺鏡池棲息ワタカ; Tōdaiji Kagami-ike seisoku wataka	Nara			34°41′14″N 135°50′25″E		for all refs see
Japanese Chinquapin Forest in the Precinct of Shōryaku-ji; Castanopsis cuspidata 正暦寺境内のコジイ林; Shōryakuji keidai no kojii-rin	Nara			34°38′41″N 135°52′07″E		
Five-coloured Japanese camellias Camellia japonica 五色椿; Go-shiki tsubaki	Nara	in the grounds of Byakugō-ji		34°40′16″N 135°51′04″E		

== Municipal Natural Monuments ==
As of 1 May 2020, forty-two Natural Monuments have been designated at a municipal level.

Monument	Municipality	Comments	Image	Coordinates	Type	Ref.
Giant Asian Bayberry in the Precinct of Kasuga Taisha; Nageia nagi 春日大社境内のナギ巨樹; Kasuga Taisha keidai no nagi kyōju	Nara			34°40′53″N 135°50′54″E		

== See also ==
- Cultural Properties of Japan
- Parks and gardens in Nara Prefecture
- List of Places of Scenic Beauty of Japan (Nara)
- List of Historic Sites of Japan (Nara)
