= Murō-Akame-Aoyama Quasi-National Park =

Quasi-national park in Japan

- 室生赤目青山国定公園
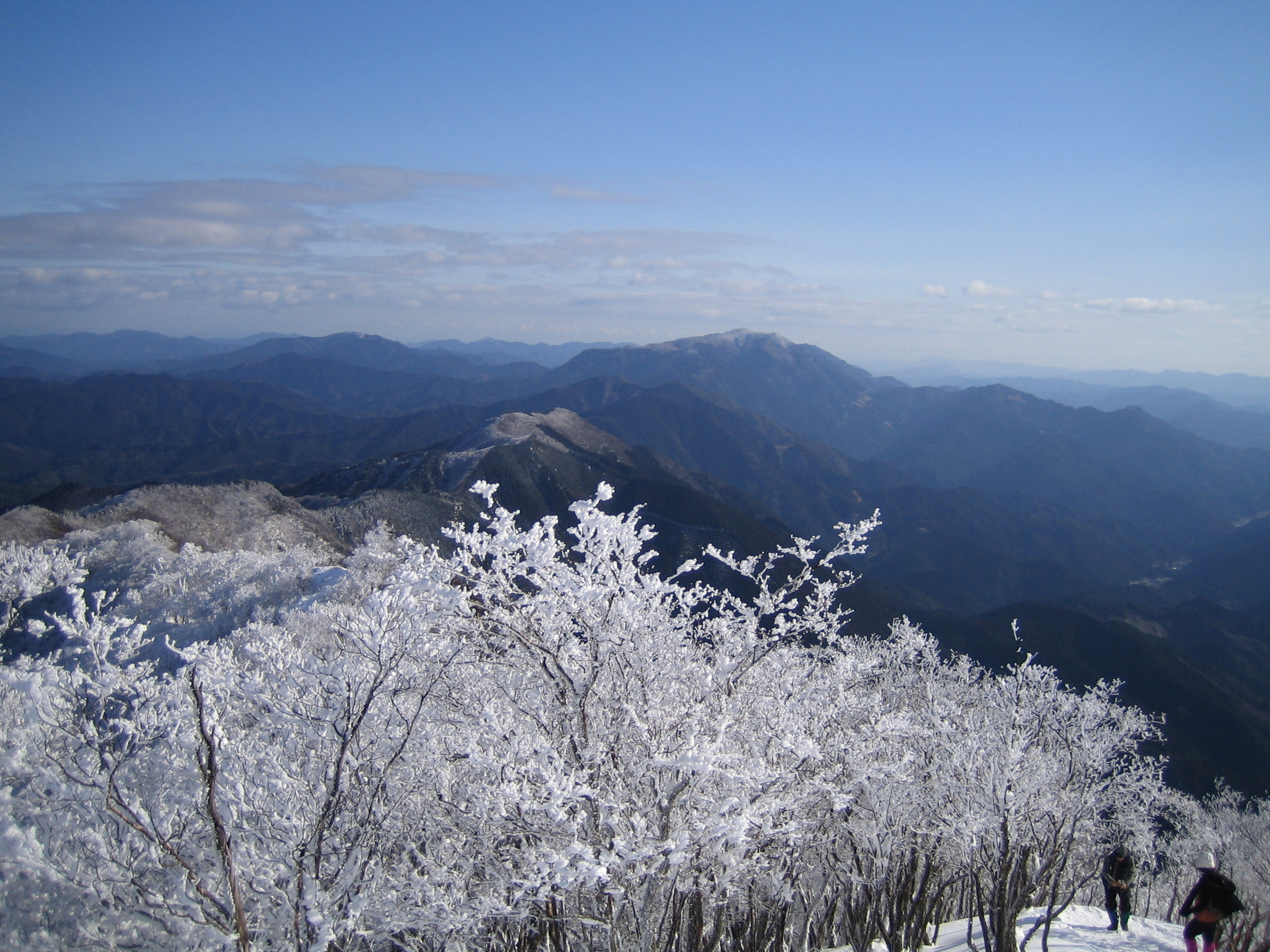
- Mount Takami

- Location within Japan
- Location: Mie/Nara Prefecture, Japan
- Coordinates: 34°13′23″N 135°57′36″E
- Area: 263.08 km^{2} (101.58 sq mi)
- Established: 28 December 1970

Murō-Akame-Aoyama Quasi-National Park (室生赤目青山国定公園, Murō-Akame-Aoyama Kokutei Kōen) is a Quasi-National Park in Mie and Nara Prefectures, Japan. It was established in 1970.

== Places of interest ==
- Mie: Akame Shijūhachi Falls (赤目四十八滝), Aoyama plateau (青山高原), Mount Miune (三峰山), Kitabatake Jinja (北畠神社)
- Nara: Mount Takami, Murō volcanic cluster (室生火山群), Kaichō-ji (戒長寺), Murō-ji, Ōno-ji

== Related municipalities ==
- Mie: Iga, Matsusaka, Nabari, Tsu
- Nara: Higashiyoshino, Mitsue, Nara, Sakurai, Soni, Uda

== See also ==
- List of national parks of Japan
