= Kunimi =

Kunimi may refer to:

- Kunimi, Fukushima, a town in Date District, Fukushima, Japan
- Kunimi, Nagasaki, a former town in Minamitakaki District, Nagasaki, Japan
- Kunimi, Ōita, a former town in Higashikunisaki District, Ōita, Japan
- Kunimi (practice), the practice of climbing a mountain to survey the land
- Mount Kunimi (Kanagawa), a mountain on the border of Isehara, Hadano and Atsugi in Kanagawa Prefecture, Japan
- Mount Kunimi (Daikō), a mountain on the border of Higashiyoshino, Nara, and Matsusaka, Mie, Japan
