= Kushida River =

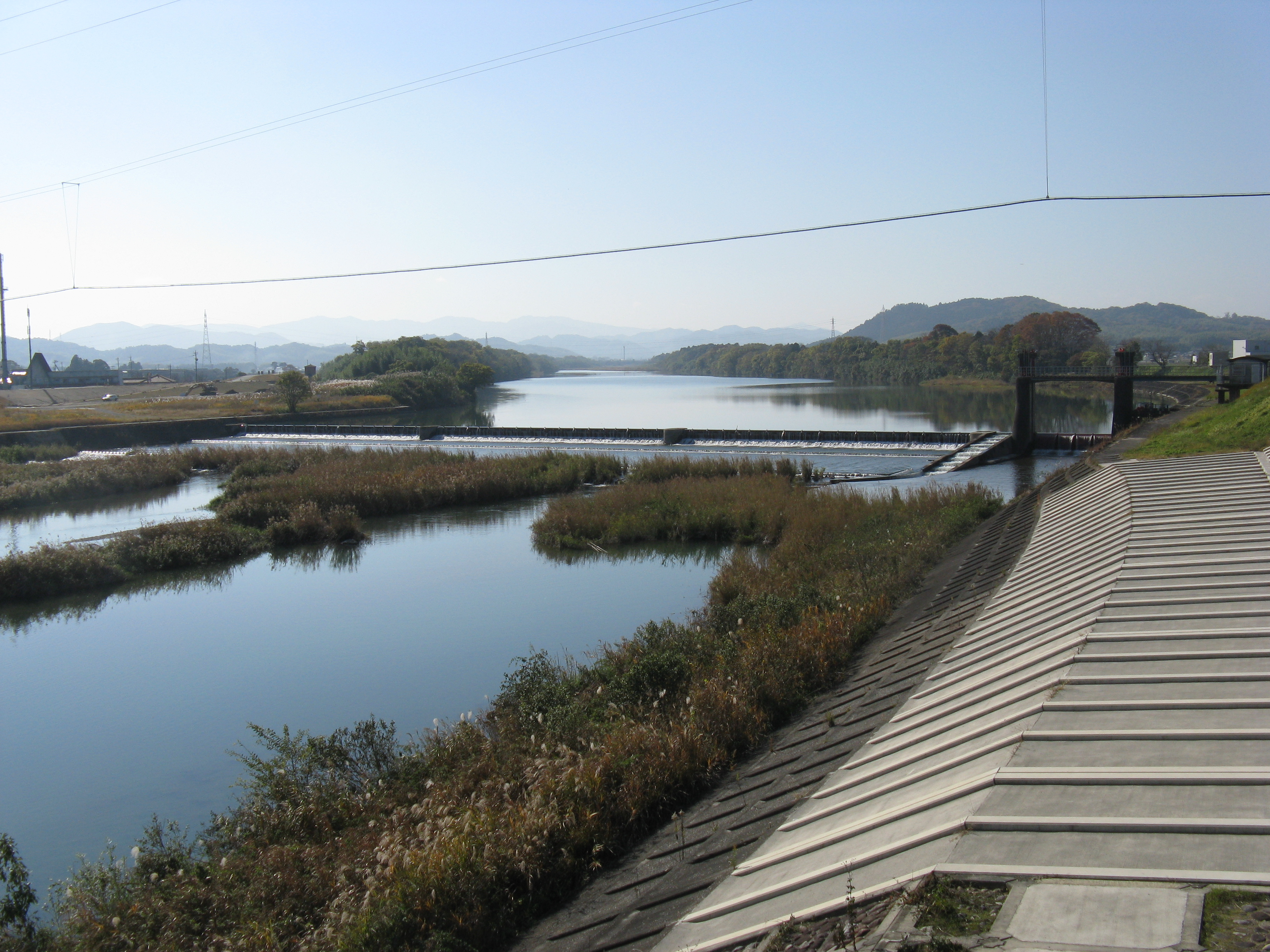
- The river as it approaches the kushida district

- Location within Japan
- Native name: 櫛田川 (Japanese)

Location
- Country: Japan

Physical characteristics
- Source
  - location: Mount Takami
  - elevation: 1,249 m (4,098 ft)
- Mouth
  - location: Ise Bay
  - coordinates: 34°36′19″N 136°34′18″E
- Length: 85 km (53 mi)
- Basin size: 461 km^{2} (178 sq mi)
- Discharge
  - average: 16.7 m^{3}/s (590 cu ft/s)

The Kushida River (櫛田川, Kushida-gawa) is a major river that flows through central Mie Prefecture on the island of Honshū, Japan. It is officially classified as a Class 1 river by the Japanese government, one of four Class 1 rivers that flow solely through Mie. The majority of river's course is through the city of Matsusaka.

The river's source is on Mount Takami, which stands on the border of Mie and Nara Prefectures. From the mountain, it then flows eastwards and passes through a number of dams before reaching its delta and flowing into Ise Bay.

== Name ==
It is thought that the name of the river comes from an old legend about Yamatohime-no-Mikoto, the imperial princess of olden times who is said to have established Ise Grand Shrine.

According to the ancient book detailing her story, while being led by the supreme deity Amaterasu to the land of what is now Ise Grand Shrine, she dropped a comb ("kushi" in Japanese) somewhere along her journey. It is believed that the area where the comb was lost was then named kushida (literally meaning "comb field"). It could be said that the river gained its name from the fact that it flows through this small kushida region, which is on the eastern edge of Matsusaka near the border with Meiwa.

== Course ==
Mie Prefecture
Matsusaka • Taki
