= Horses in Japan =

Horses in Japan may refer to:

- Horse racing in Japan
  - Japan Cup
  - Japanese Horse of the Year
- List of Japanese horse breeds
- Horses in Japanese Warfare
- Shinme
