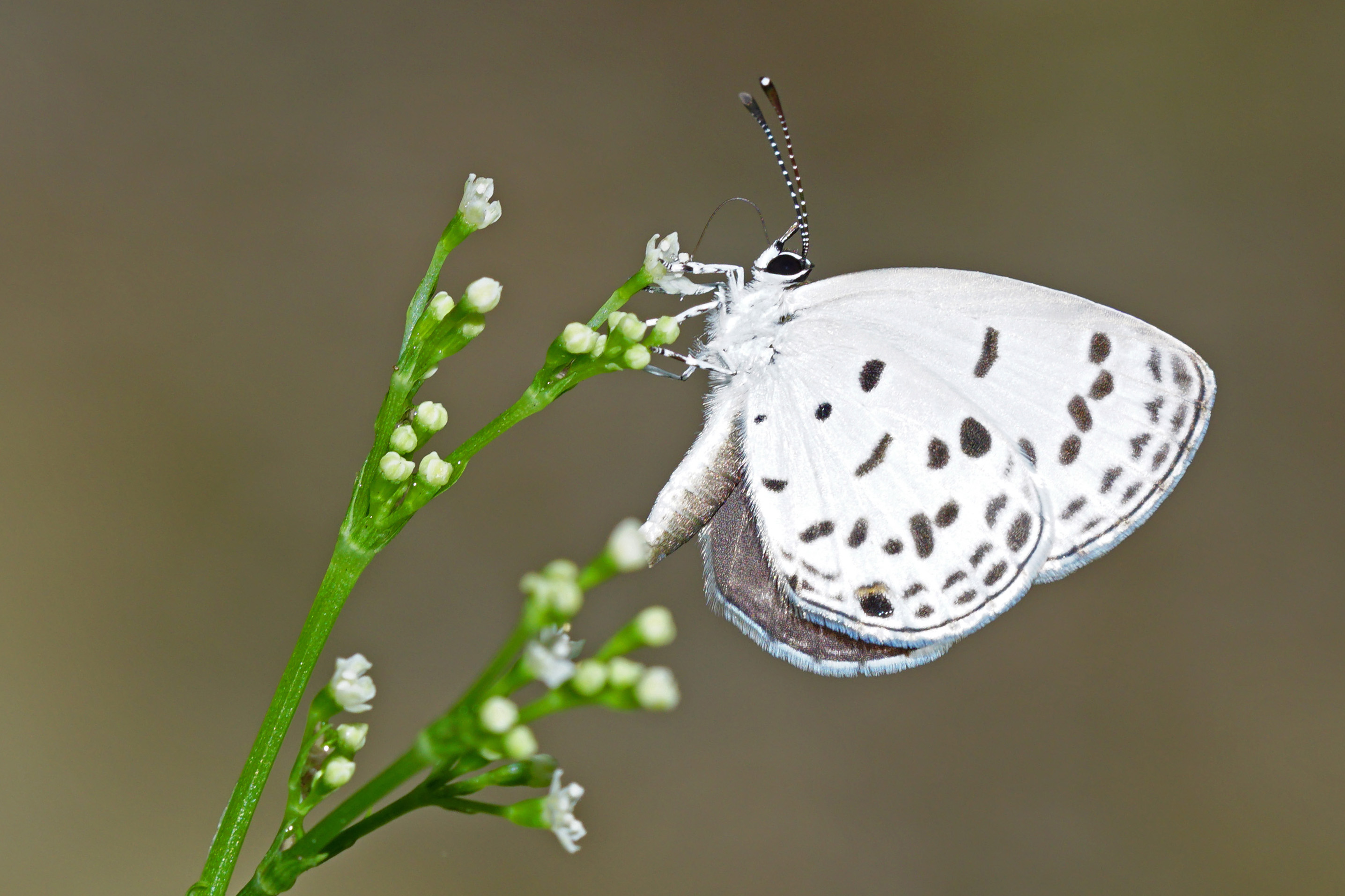
- Shijimia moorei

Scientific classification
- Domain: Eukaryota
- Kingdom: Animalia
- Phylum: Arthropoda
- Class: Insecta
- Order: Lepidoptera
- Family: Lycaenidae
- Subfamily: Polyommatinae
- Tribe: Polyommatini
- Genus: Shijimia; Masamura, 1919

= Shijimia =

Monotypic butterfly genus in family Lycaenidae

Shijimia is a genus of butterflies in the family Lycaenidae. It is monotypic, containing only the species Shijimia moorei.
