= Shinme =

Sacred horses in Japan

Shinme (神馬; also read jinme or kamiuma) are sacred horses in Japan that act as mounts for kami (Shinto deities or spirits). It is not common for the horses to be worshipped as kami themselves. Shinme can refer to both horses donated to Shinto shrines and those used in festivals. There are no official requirements for the type of horse, though white horses are generally more prized as shinme. However, most of these white horses are in fact gray, and a study looking into the sexes of shinme offered to Ise Shrine between 1865 and 2017 found no mares. In addition to white horses, horses with rare coat colors are also often selected as shinme.

The characters for shinme can also be read shinba, but this reading refers to mystical horses acting as messengers from the kami, rather than horses offered to the kami from humans as steeds.

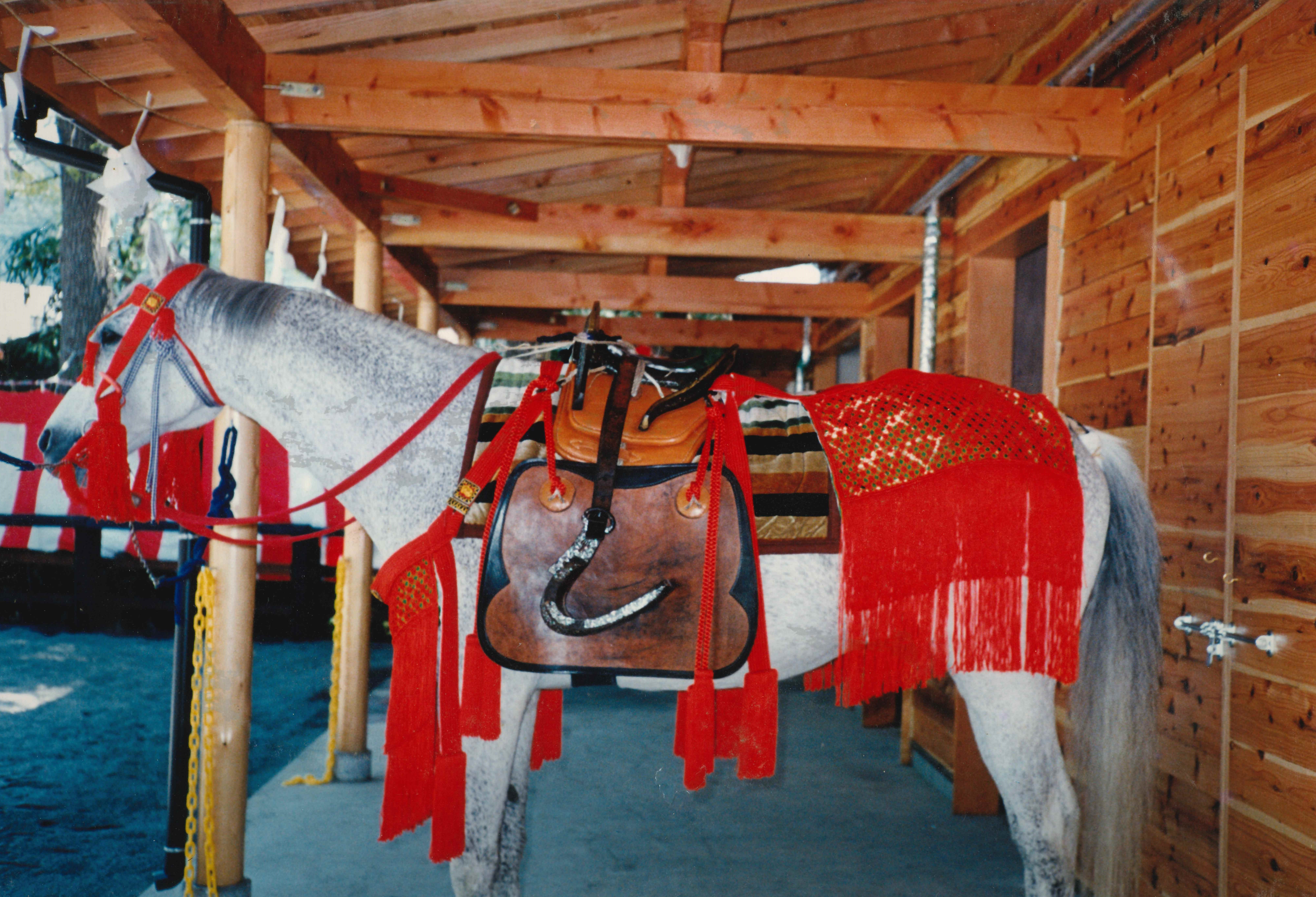
A shinme offered to the kami. The horse was a retired Thoroughbred racehorse donated to Fujisan Shimomiya Omurosengen Shrine.

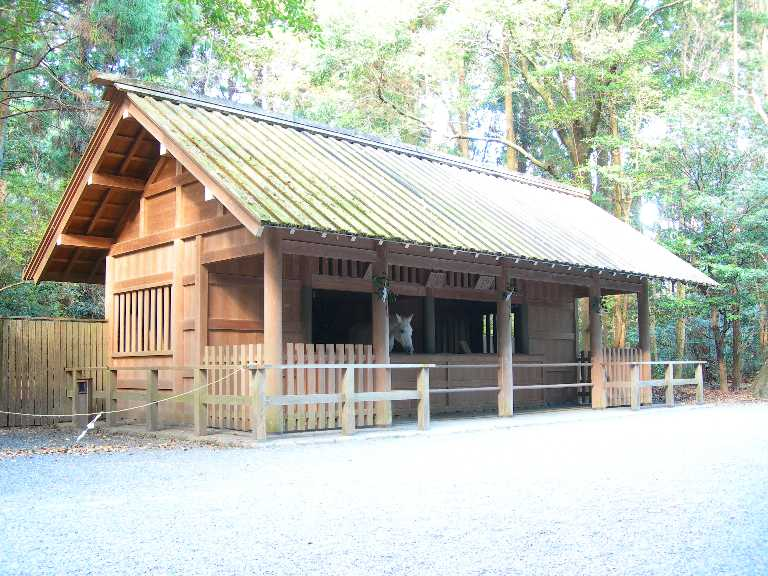
Stable in Ise Shrine with shinme Okaaki inside.

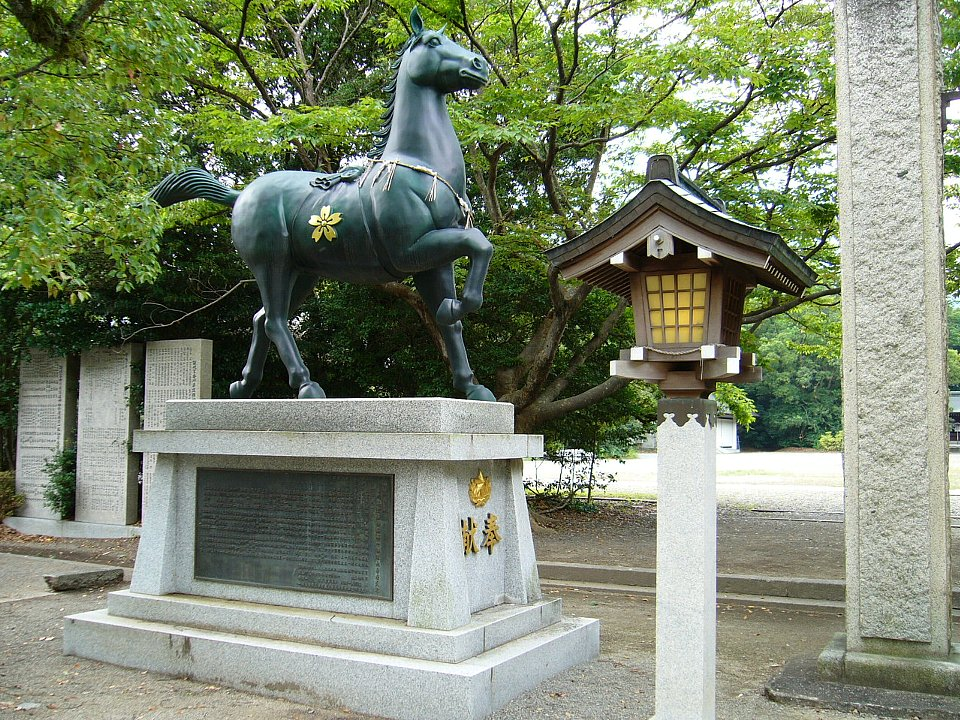
Metal shinme statue (Kagawaken Gokoku Shrine)

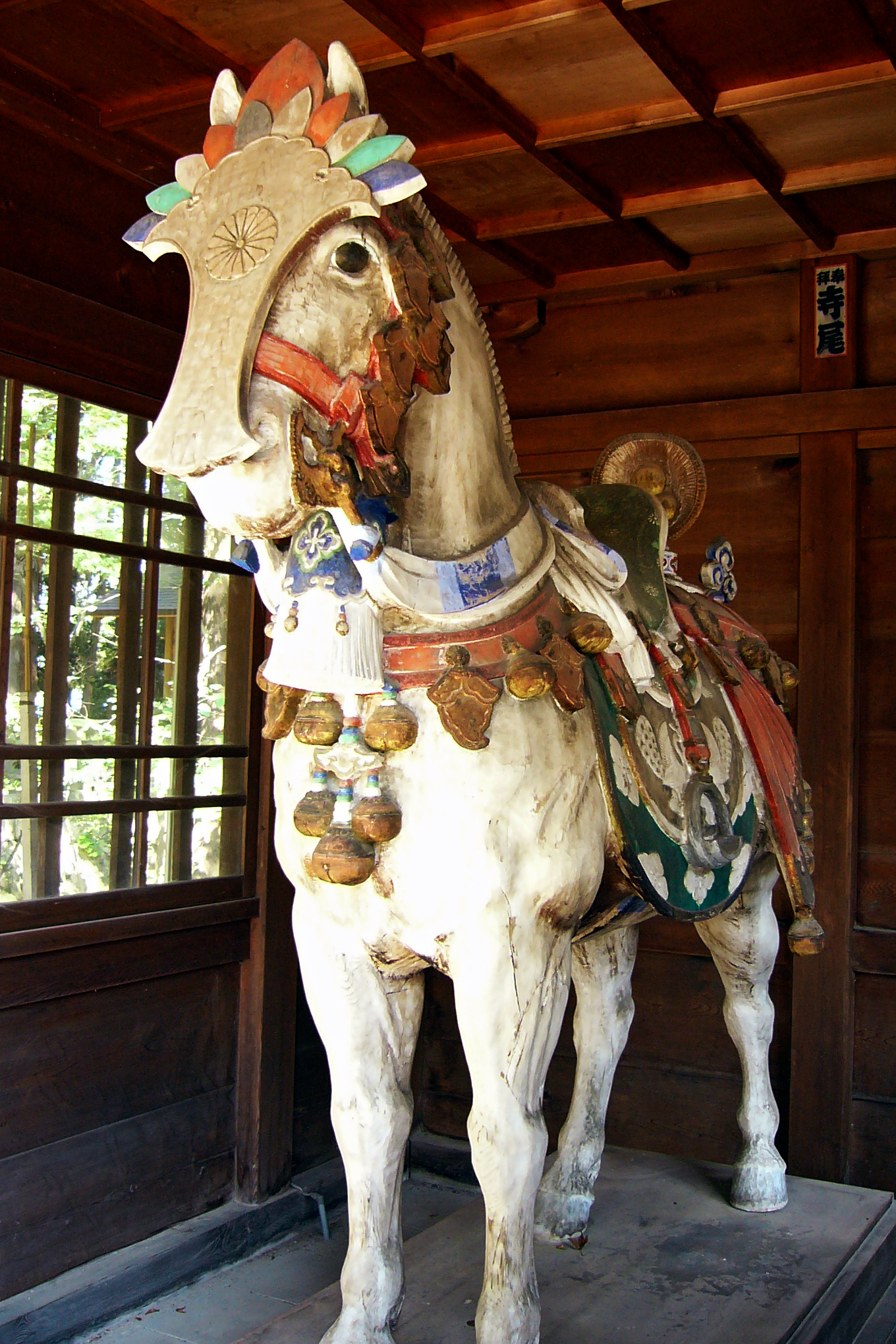
Wooden shinme statue (Hotaka Shrine)

== Overview ==
The custom of offering horses to kami began in the Nara period and was done by a variety of types of people, from commoners to members of the imperial family.

As caring for these horses was a burden on smaller shrines and also a significant expense from the donating side, the practice of offering shinme was replaced in some instances with the offerings of ema. Life-sized statues of horses have also been used as shinme.

Book 3 of the Engishiki states that one should offer a black horse when praying for rain and a white horse when praying for sun. Later, the noh play Ema depicted a kami hanging a black ema and white ema. Warriors in the Middle Ages would offer horses to shrines when praying for victory. Some older shrines contain stables specifically for shinme showing influence of the shinme practice.

It is also not uncommon for large numbers of horses to be used in festival, and such horses are also referred to shinme for the period of the festival, and there have been instances of retired Thoroughbred racehorses being offered as shinme.

== Shrines with live shinme ==
- Ise Shrine
- Kanda Shrine
- Hiratsuka Hachimangū (Hiratsuka, Kanagawa Prefecture)
- Tado Taisha
- Sumiyoshi-taisha
- Usa Jingū
- Nikkō Tōshō-gū
- Kamigamo Shrine
- Iwashimizu Hachimangū
- Yoshikawa Hachimanjinja (Toyono, Osaka Prefecture)
- Sōma Nakamura Shrine (Sōma, Fukushima)
- Kotohira-gū
- Fujisan Shimomiya Omurosengen Shrine (Fujiyoshida, Yamanashi Prefecture)
- Ishikiri Tsurugiya Shrine (Higashiōsaka, Osaka Prefecture)
- Yamato-no-Kuni Kashima Katori Hongū (Nara)
- Niukawakami Shrine
- Oishi Shrine (Akō Castle)

== Images of shinme ==
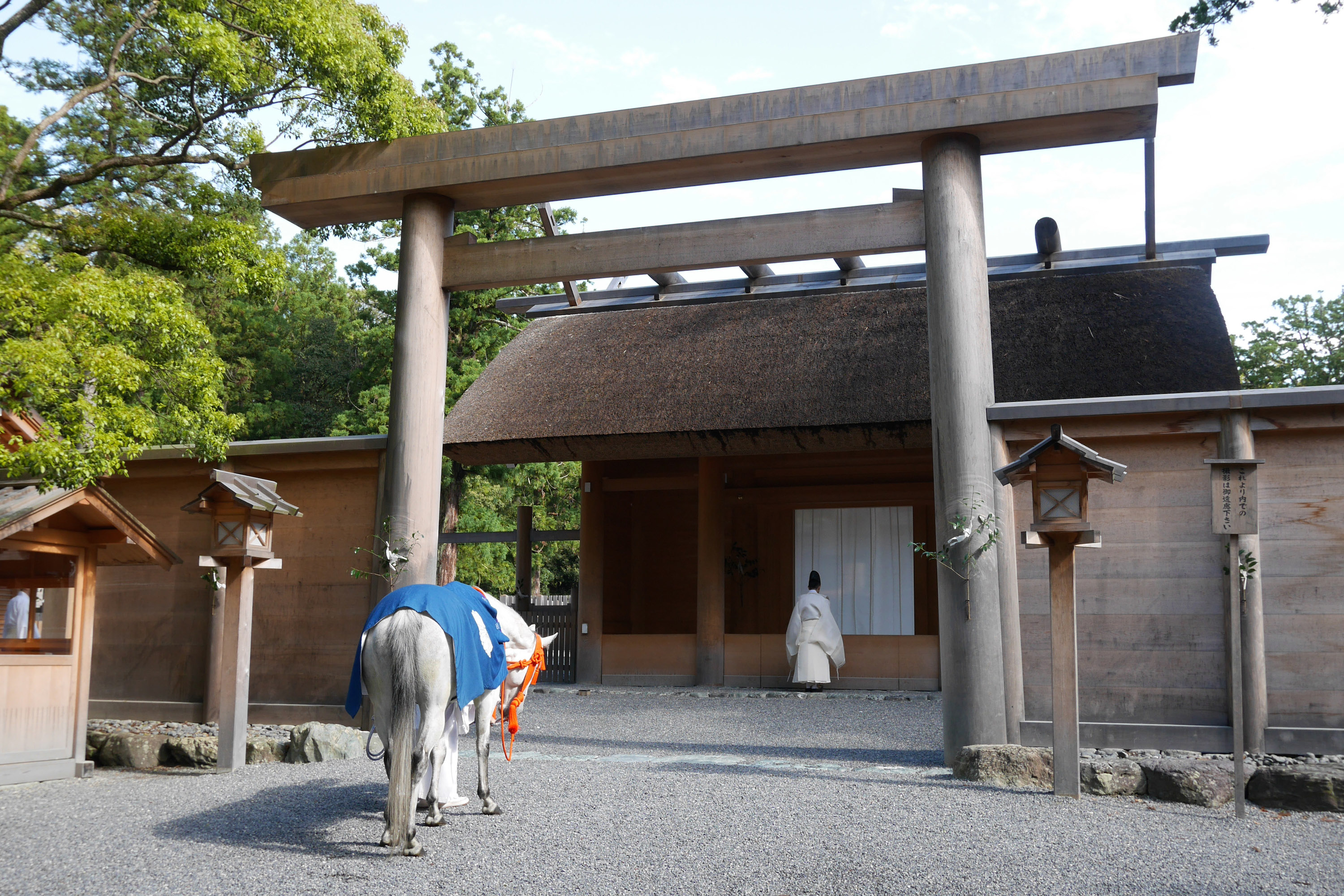
A decorated shinme (Toyouke Daijingu)

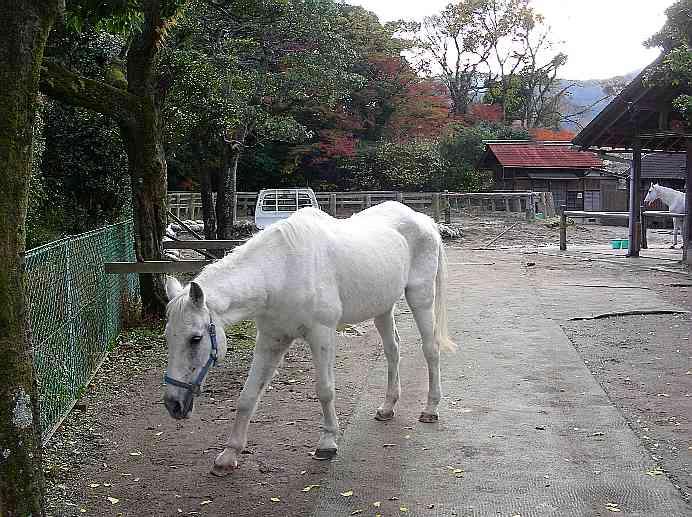
An off-duty shinme in Ise Shrine's Shinme Rest Area.

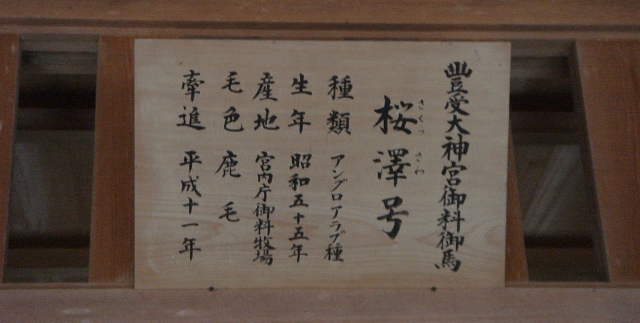
A record of Sakurasawa, a bay-colored Anglo-Arabian shinme bred by the Imperial Stock Farm of the Imperial Household Agency (Toyouke Daijingu).

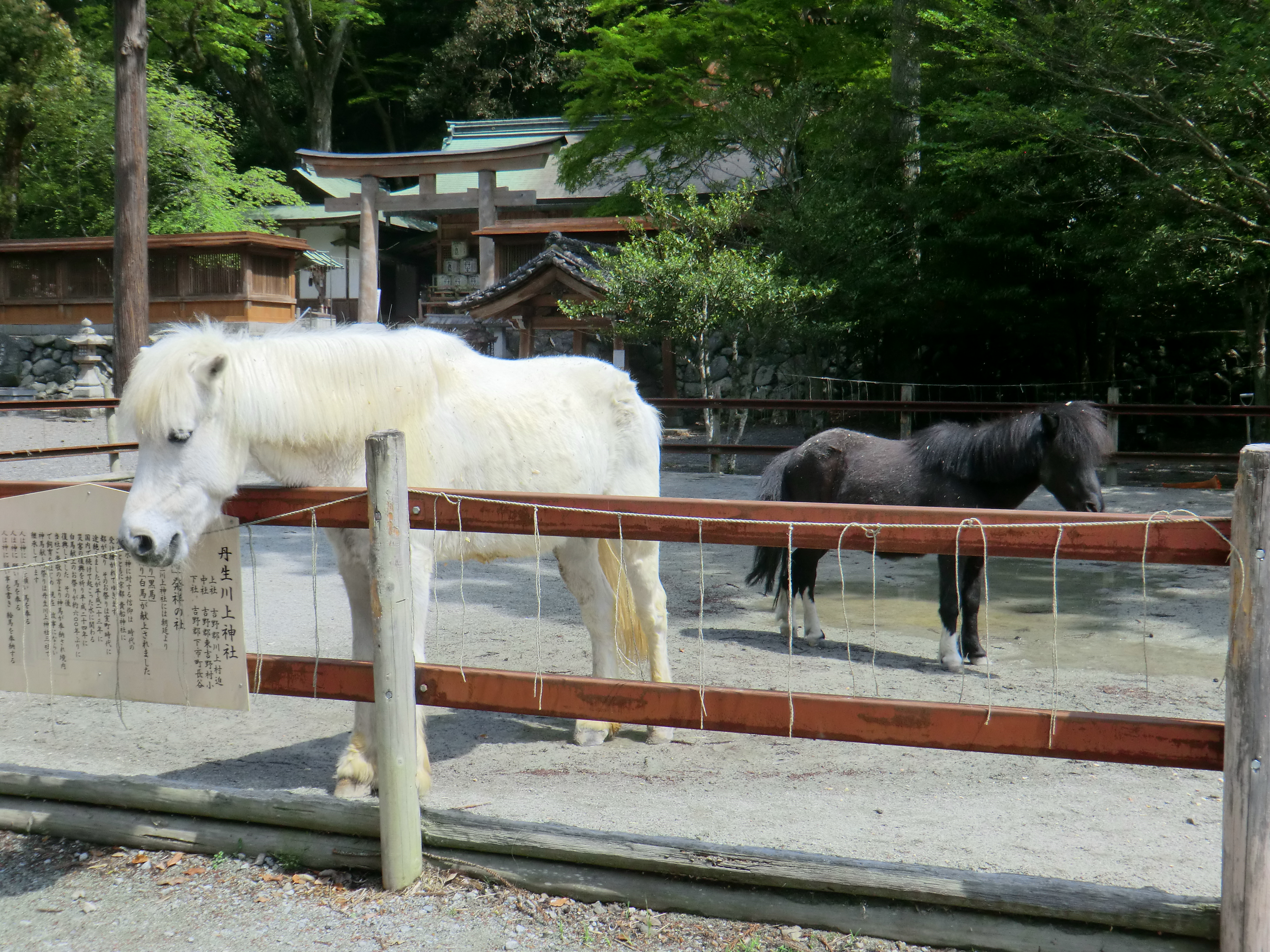
Shinme at Niukawakami Shrine.

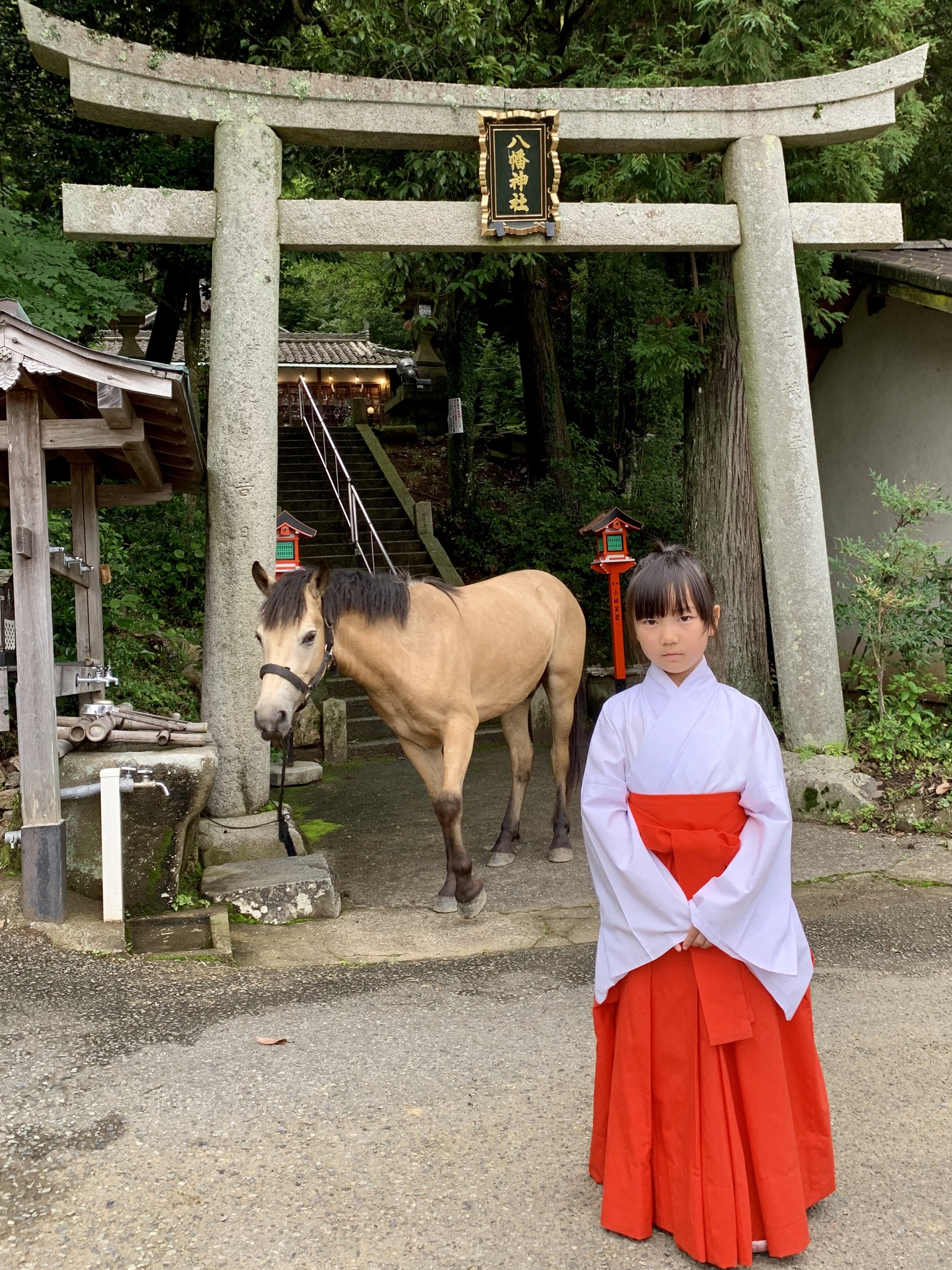
Izume, a buckskin-colored, mixed Japanese breed gelding shinme born July 23, 2017. The buckskin color is considered a symbol of a plentiful harvest due to its similarity to the color of ripe rice.

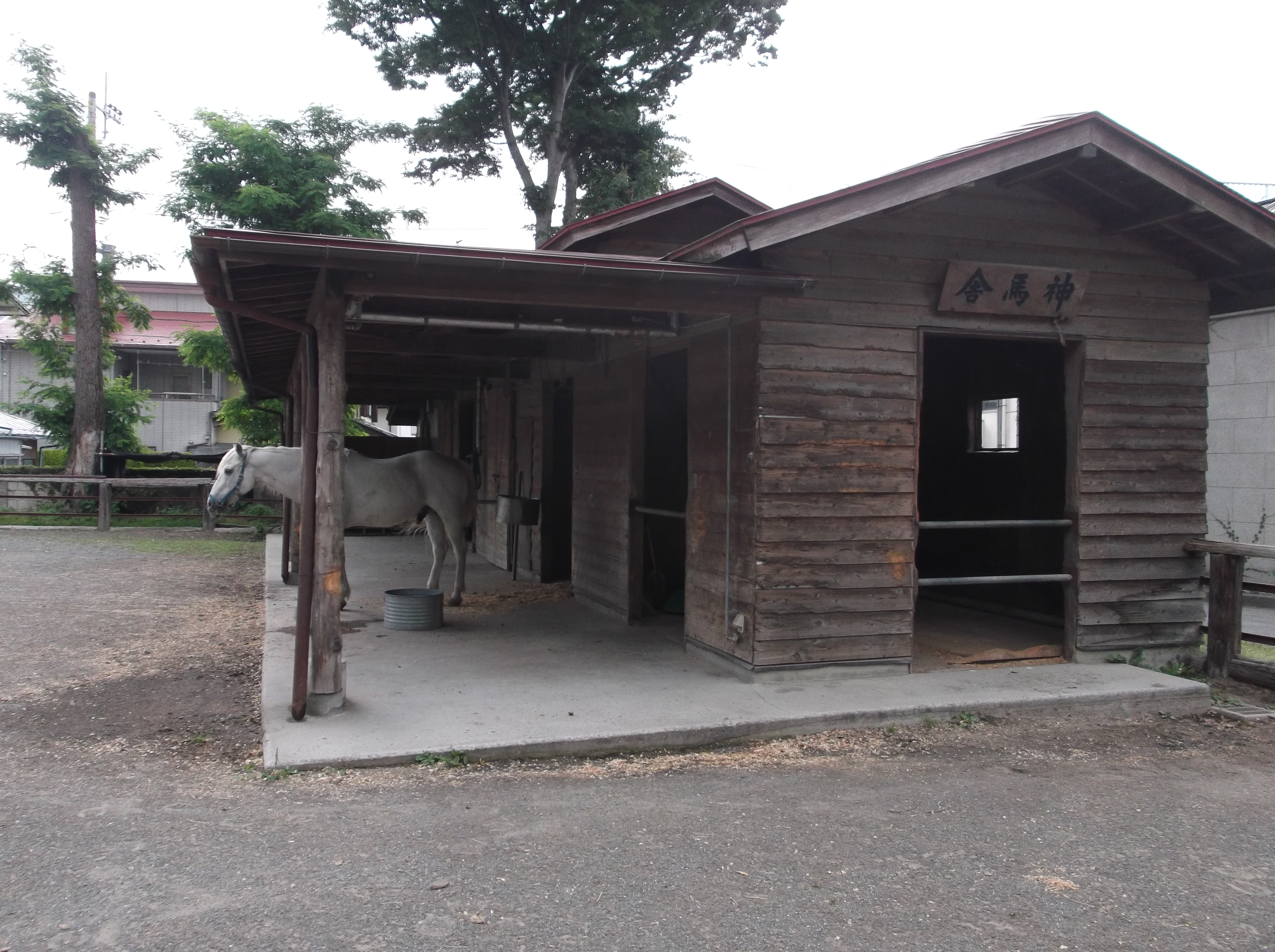
A stable for housing shinme (Fujisan Shimomiya Omurosengen Shrine).

A shinme in a stable at Kamigamo Shrine.

== See also ==
- Ema
- Equine coat color
