= Mitsue, Nara =

Mitsue 御杖村
- Village
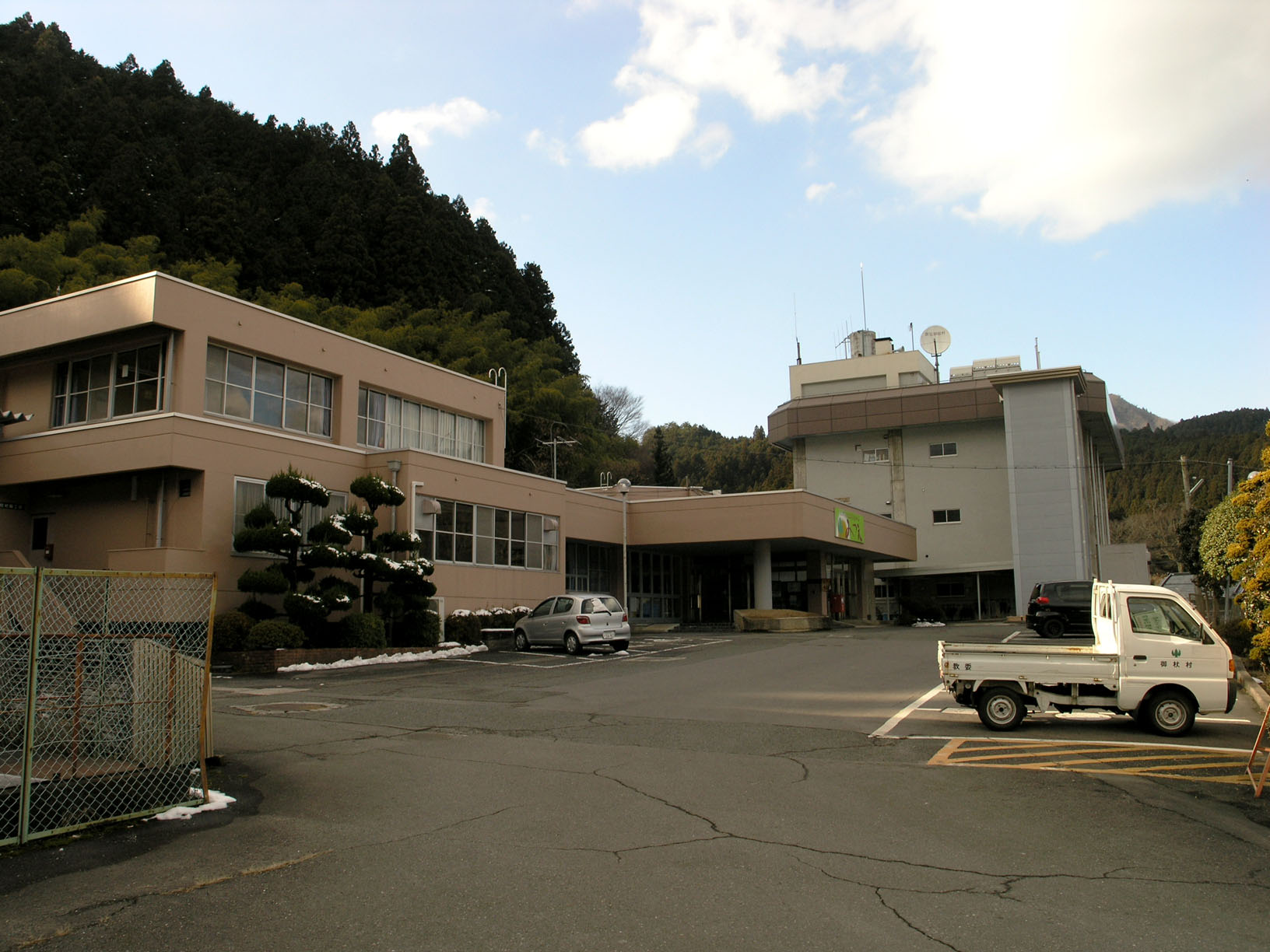
- Mitsue Village Hall

- Flag Emblem
- Interactive map of Mitsue
- Location in Japan
- Coordinates: 34°29′18″N 136°09′57″E
- Country: Japan
- Region: Kansai
- Prefecture: Nara
- District: Uda

Area
  - Total: 79.58 km^{2} (30.73 sq mi)

Population (April 1, 2024)
  - Total: 1,393
  - Density: 17.50/km^{2} (45.34/sq mi)
- Time zone: UTC+09:00 (JST)
- City hall address: 368 Sugano, Mitsue-mura, Uda-gun, Nara-ken 633-1302
- Website: Official website
- Symbols
- Bird: Japanese bush-warbler
- Flower: Prunus jamasakura
- Tree: Cryptomeria japonica

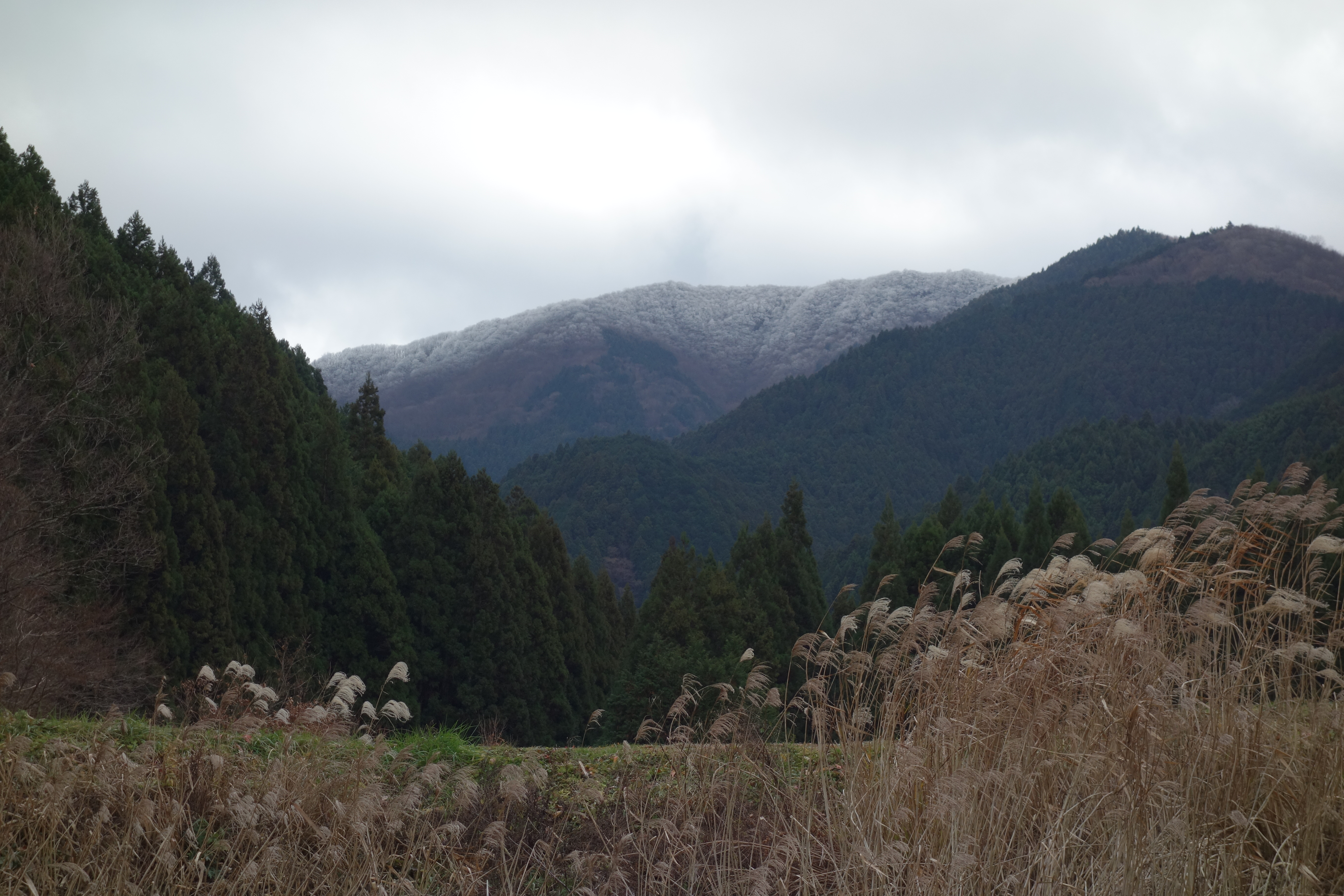
Mount Miune

Mitsue (御杖村, Mitsue-mura) is a village located in Uda District, Nara Prefecture, Japan. As of 1 April 2024, the village had an estimated population of 1393 in 782 households, and a population density of 18 persons per km^{2}. The total area of the village is 79.58 km^{2} (30.73 sq mi).

== Geography ==
Mitsue is located in the southern portion of the Soni Plateau, and the upper part of the Nabari River is situated here. The entire village is mountainous, with many peaks.

- Mountains : Mount Miune (1235 m)

=== Surrounding municipalities ===
Mie Prefecture

- Matsusaka
- Tsu

Nara Prefecture

- Higashiyoshino
- Soni

=== Climate ===
Mitsue has a humid subtropical climate (Köppen Cfa) characterized by warm summers and cool winters with light to no snowfall. The average annual temperature in Mitsue is 12.5 °C. The average annual rainfall is 2174 mm with September as the wettest month. The temperatures are highest on average in August, at around 24.0 °C, and lowest in January, at around 1.1 °C.

=== Demographics ===
Per Japanese census data, the population of Mitsue is as shown below

Historical population
Year	Pop.	±%
1940	4,651	—
1950	5,525	+18.8%
1960	5,533	+0.1%
1970	3,852	−30.4%
1980	3,430	−11.0%
1990	3,035	−11.5%
2000	2,623	−13.6%
2010	2,102	−19.9%
2020	1,479	−29.6%

== History ==
The area of Mitsue was part of ancient Yamato Province. The village of Mitsue was established on April 1, 1889 with the creation of the modern municipalities system.

== Government ==
Mitsui has a mayor-council form of government with a directly elected mayor and a unicameral village council of eight members. Nosegawa, collectively with the other municipalities of Ikoma District, contributes four members to the Nara Prefectural Assembly. In terms of national politics, the village is part of the Nara 3rd district of the lower house of the Diet of Japan.

== Economy ==
The local economy is based on agriculture and forestry. The village is developing a new program to revitalize the forestry industry it by exporting model homes to Thailand, where similar wooden architecture has largely disappeared.

== Education ==
Mitsue has one public elementary high school and one public junior high school operated by the village government. The village does not have a high school.

== Transportation ==
=== Railways ===
Mitsue does not have any passenger railway service. The nearest train stations are Haibara Station or Nabari Station on the Kintetsu Osaka Line Cable Line.

=== Highways ===
- National Route 368
- National Route 369

== Notable locations ==
- Maruyama Park
- Mitsue Hot Springs
- Mitsue Plateau Ranch

Mitsue also hosts an annual scarecrow festival.
