= Kunimi (practice) =

Practice of climbing a mountain to survey the land

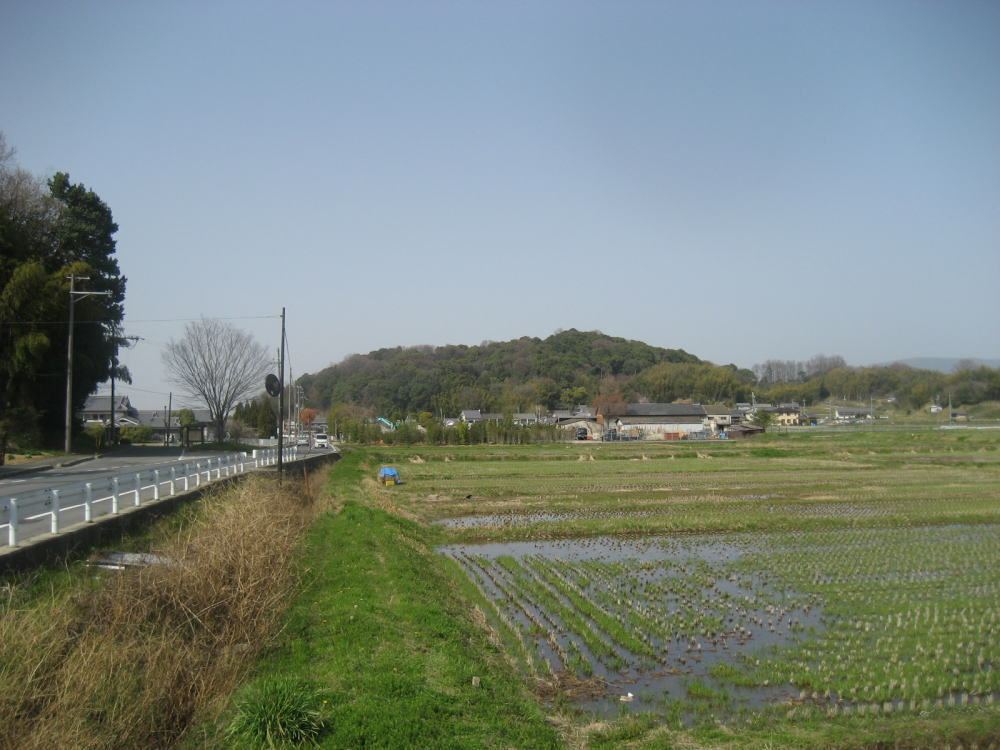
Ama-no-Kaguyama or "Heavenly Mount Kagu", locus for kunimi in Yamato

The ancient Japanese practice of kunimi (国見), lit. "viewing the realm", involved climbing a mountain to survey the land, often before praising it in song. It also often uses spatial elements and metaphors to affirm prosperity and power of a ruler. It is documented in the early chronicles the Kojiki and Nihon Shoki as well as in a number of poems in the Man'yōshū.

== Origins ==
Close association with the Imperial House may suggest that kunimi was an agricultural rite imported from China; alternatively it may have been a folk practice. The "blood relationship" between emperor and land gives kunimi added significance.

The earliest documented occurrence was in 663 BC, when Emperor Jimmu ascended a mountain in Uda and spotted 80 bandits on Kunimi Hill. He is advised by the kami to subdue them by gathering clay from Mount Kagu and creating from it sacred vessels for propitiatory sacrifice accompanied by incantation. In 630 Jimmu himself ascended the hill of Wakigami no Hohoma no Oka, viewed the land, and observed:

"Oh! what a beautiful country we have become possessed of! Though a blessed land of inner-tree-fibre, yet it resembles a dragonfly licking its hinder parts".

The imperial excursions of Emperor Ōjin and Emperor Yūryaku also led to kunimi.

During the early centuries in Japan, particularly from the fifth century onwards, there are signs that indicate shifts in the political and cultural landscape. The rulers of Yamato began portraying themselves as dominant figures of order, referring to their territories as the "Realm beneath Heaven." Following the Jinshin War in 672, this concept gained prominence during the reigns of Emperor Tenmu and Emperor Jitō, who both claimed the prestigious title of “Heavenly Sovereign”.

During this period in which the Kojiki came to a completion in 712, followed by the Nihon Shoki in 720, poetry emerged as a significant aspect in representing political order, and an essential for the art of proper government, influenced by Chinese poetic traditions.

Around the 7th century, the thematics of poetry in Japan became defined and regularised, in which a fixed pattern of 5 and 7 syllable lines alternated, and themes centred around love and power were evident. Hence, the customs of Kunimi poems, or “land-viewing” ritual began to be compiled in the Man’yōshū. Denoted from the literal meaning of “Kunimi” being “land-viewing”, these poems compiled in the Man'yōshū, Kojiki, and Nihon Shoki, describe the ritual act of the sovereign ascending to a high point to look upon the land of Yamato. This symbolises their supremacy and dominance, while also celebrating the prosperity of their realm, which is potentially a ritual in and of itself.

For instance, Jomei’s poem in the Man'yōshū illustrates the sovereign’s ascent up Mount Kagu observing the smoke rising from dwellings, and the soaring seagulls from the peak. This view inspires Jomei to express pride in his land and symbolically claim dominion. It is said that the poem’s metaphorical significance extends even further as a ritual act through its existence and words that may have never even been enacted.

== Examples ==
There are a number of kunimi uta or land-viewing poems

=== Man'yōshū 1: 2 by Emperor Jomei ===
Yamato ni wa
Murayama areto
Toriyorou
Ame no Kaguyama
Nobaritachi
Kunimi o sureba
Kunihara wa
Kuburi tachitatsu
Unahara wa
Kamame Tachitasu
Umashi kuni so
Akizushima
yamato no kui wa

— Emperor Jomei
Translation:

In Yamato
There are crowds of mountains
But our rampart
Is Heavenly Mount Kagu:
When I climb it
And look out across the land,
Over the land-plain
Smoke rises and rises;
Over the sea-plain
Seagulls rise and rise.
A fair land it is,
Dragonfly Island,
The land of Yamato.

— translated by Edwin A. Cranston

This land-praising poem is composed by the emperor Jomei. The origin of "Dragonfly" refers to Japan according to the mythological first Emperor of japan, Jimmu

One interpretation suggests the “realistic landscape interpretation" in which the ruler is seeing the land as it exists in reality. As seen in the poem, it depicts smoke rising and birds flying over the sea-plain connoting his prosperous subjects and abundance of natural resources such as fish in the ocean. However, a counter argument arises regarding the visibility of the sea from Mount Kagu as mentioned in the poem, leading to the second interpretation claiming that the smoke and seagulls are indications of the “life-force” of the realm that are responding to the sovereign's act of “looking”, and not something tangible in reality. Lastly, according to the third interpretation noted as the “metaphorical interpretation”, proposes that the “land-plain” and “sea-plain” constitutes a binary expression representing the realm entirely. As such, the “metaphorical interpretation” suggests that the sovereign’s observation in this poem is not limited to Mt. Kagu and the scenery, but extends to the prosperity of the entire realm of Yamato.

Kojiki song # 41 by Emperor Ōjin

Chiba no
Kazuno o mireba
Momochidaru
Yaniwa mo miyu
Yaniwa mo miyu
Kuni no ho mo miyu

— Emperor Ojin
Translation:

Leafy Kazuno
Vinefields of the thousand leaves:
Looking, I can see
Hundreds, thousands of houses -
And I can see the summits of the land

— translated by Edwin A. Cranston

In the poem/songs above, the emperor Ojin stood on Uji field and praise the land on the trip to Chikatu Omi (the province around Lake Biwa).

Nihonshoki song # 77 by Emperor Yūryaku

Komoriku no
Hatsuse no yama wa
Idetachi no
Yoroshiki yama
washiride no
Yoroshiki yama no
Komoriku no
Hatsuse no yama wa
Aya ni uraguwashi
Aya ni uraguwashi

— Emperor Yuraku
Translation:

Hidden
Hatsuse Mountain -
Going forth,
How good is the mountain;
Running forth,
How good is the mountain:
Hidden
Hatsuse Mountain -
Ah how beautiful it is !
Ah how beautiful it is !

— Translated by Edwin A. Cranston

In the song above, when Emperor Yūryaku made an excursion to that field, he named the place the fields of Michi with an upsurge of emotion.

This poem attributed to Emperor Yūryaku contains Kunimi characteristics, such as the emperor observing a maiden gathering herbs, symbolizing the abundance of the land's resources.

== See also ==
- Yamato Sanzan
- Ascent of Mount Ventoux
