= Mount Takami =

Mountain in the country of Japan

- 高見山
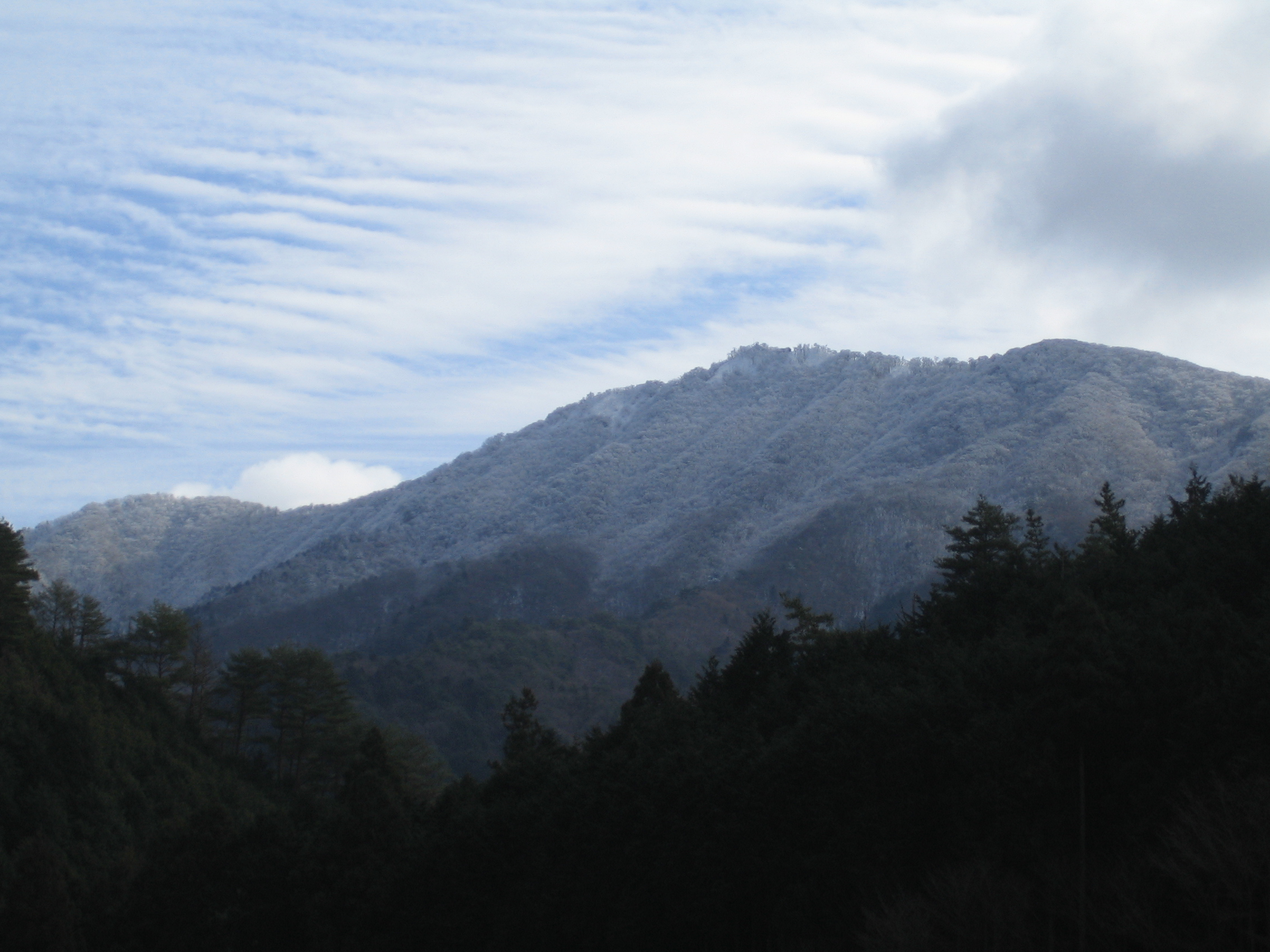
- Mount Takami from Hirano(January 2009)

Highest point
- Elevation: 1,248.3 m (4,095 ft)
- Listing: List of mountains and hills of Japan by height
- Coordinates: 34.429°N 136.088°E

Naming
- Language of name: Japanese

Geography
- Location: On the border of Higashiyoshino, Nara, and Matsusaka, Mie, Japan
- Parent range: Daiko Mountains

Mount Takami (高見山, Takami-san/Takami-yama) is a 1,248.3 m (4,095 ft) mountain of Daiko Mountains, which is located on the border of Higashiyoshino, Nara, and Matsusaka, Mie, Japan

== Outline ==
This mountain is located on the north end of Daiko Mountains. It is considered one of the 300 Famous Japanese Mountains. Mount Takami is an important part of Muro-Akame-Aoyama Quasi National Park.

== Routes ==
This mountain is very famous for the beautiful frost patterns that form on trees in winter and so attracts many climbers. There are several routes to reach the top; one is from Takami-Otoge Pass and it takes about one hour; another route is from Takami-tozanguchi Bus Stop on the Nara Kotsu bus route, and it takes two and a half hours. The third route is from Shimo-Hirano Bus Stop, also on the Nara Kotsu bus route, and it also takes two and a half hours.

== Gallery ==
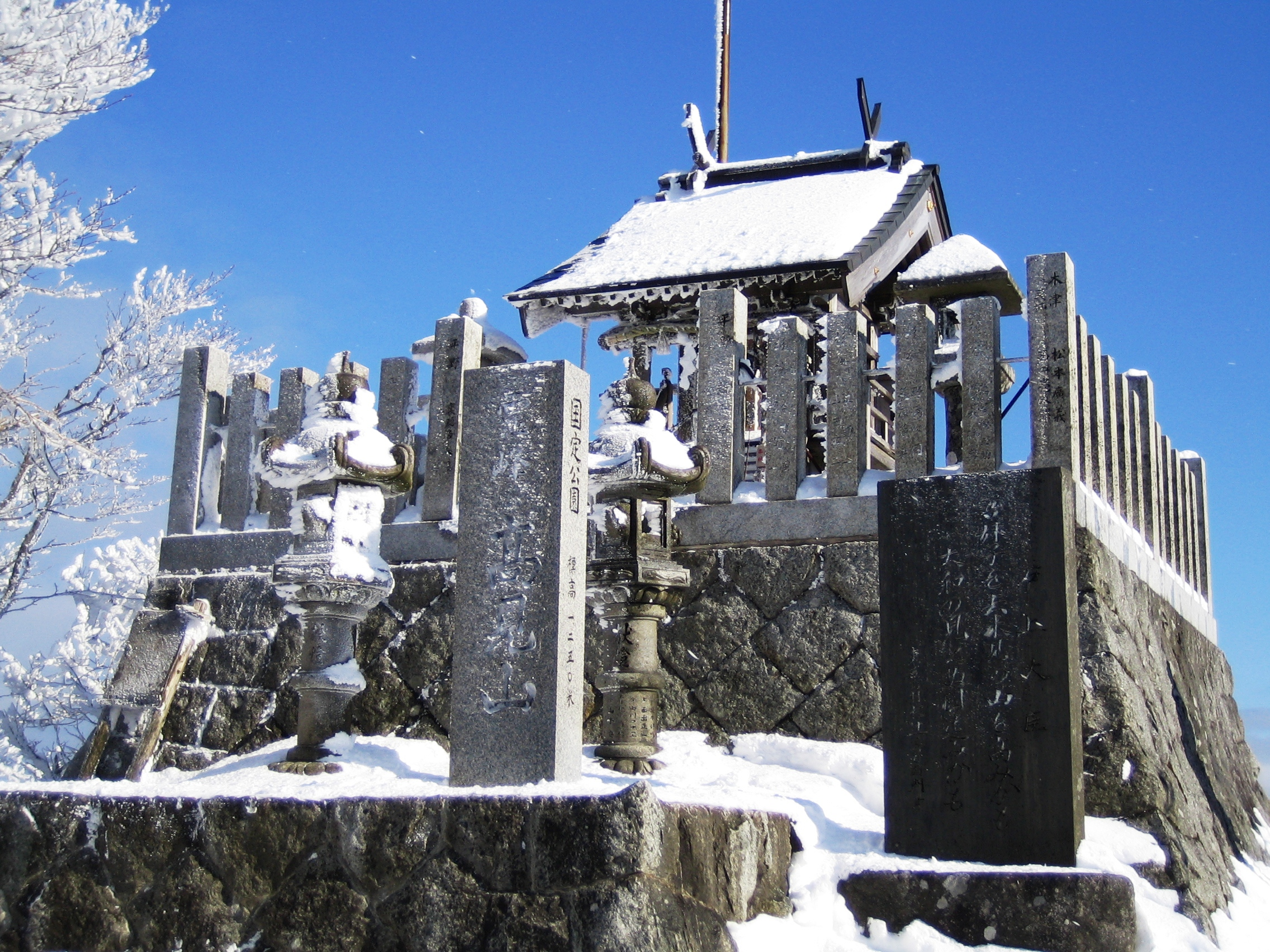
Takasumi Shrine at the top of Mount Takami (January 2009)

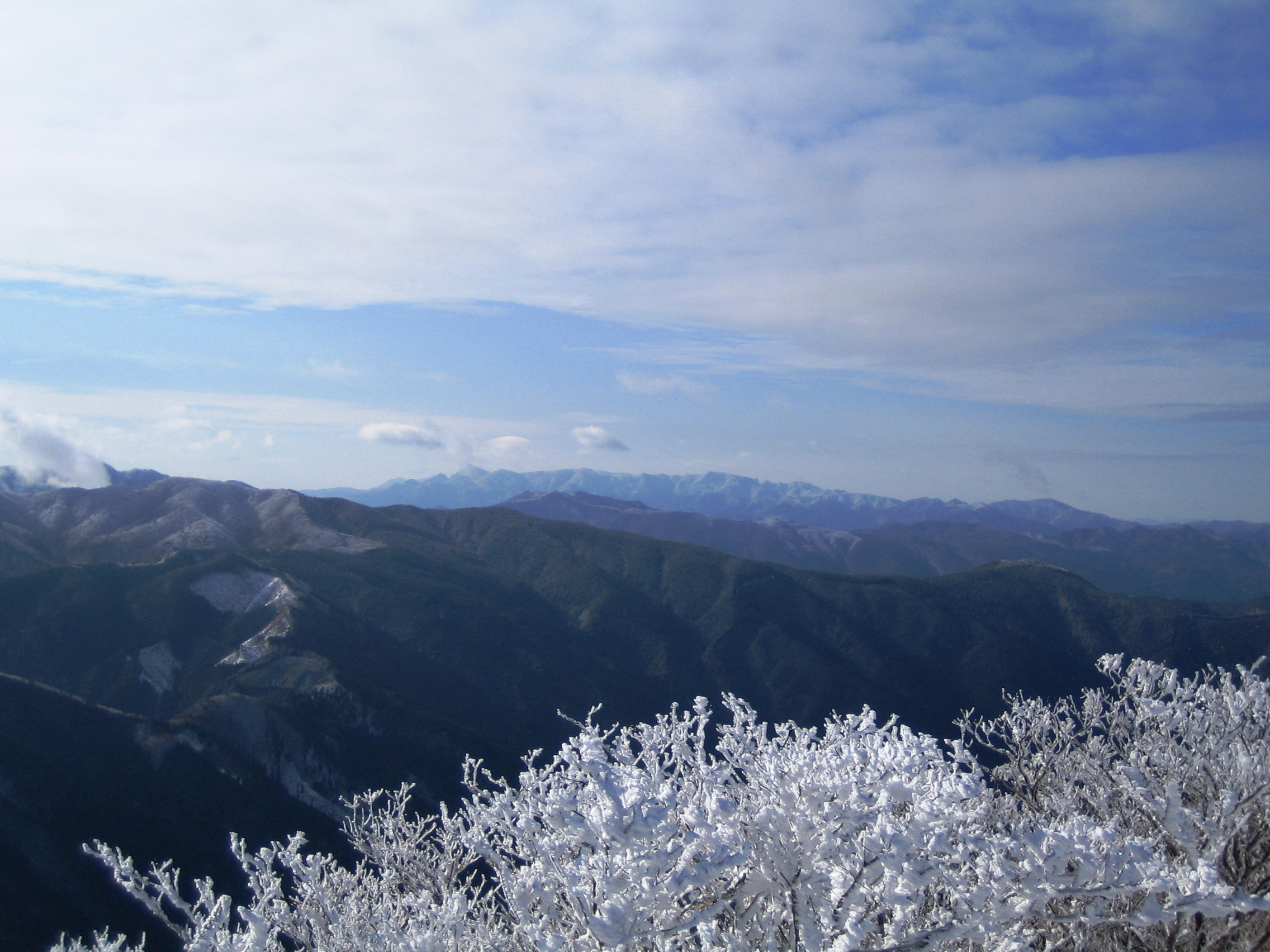
Omine Mountains from Mount Takami (January 2009)

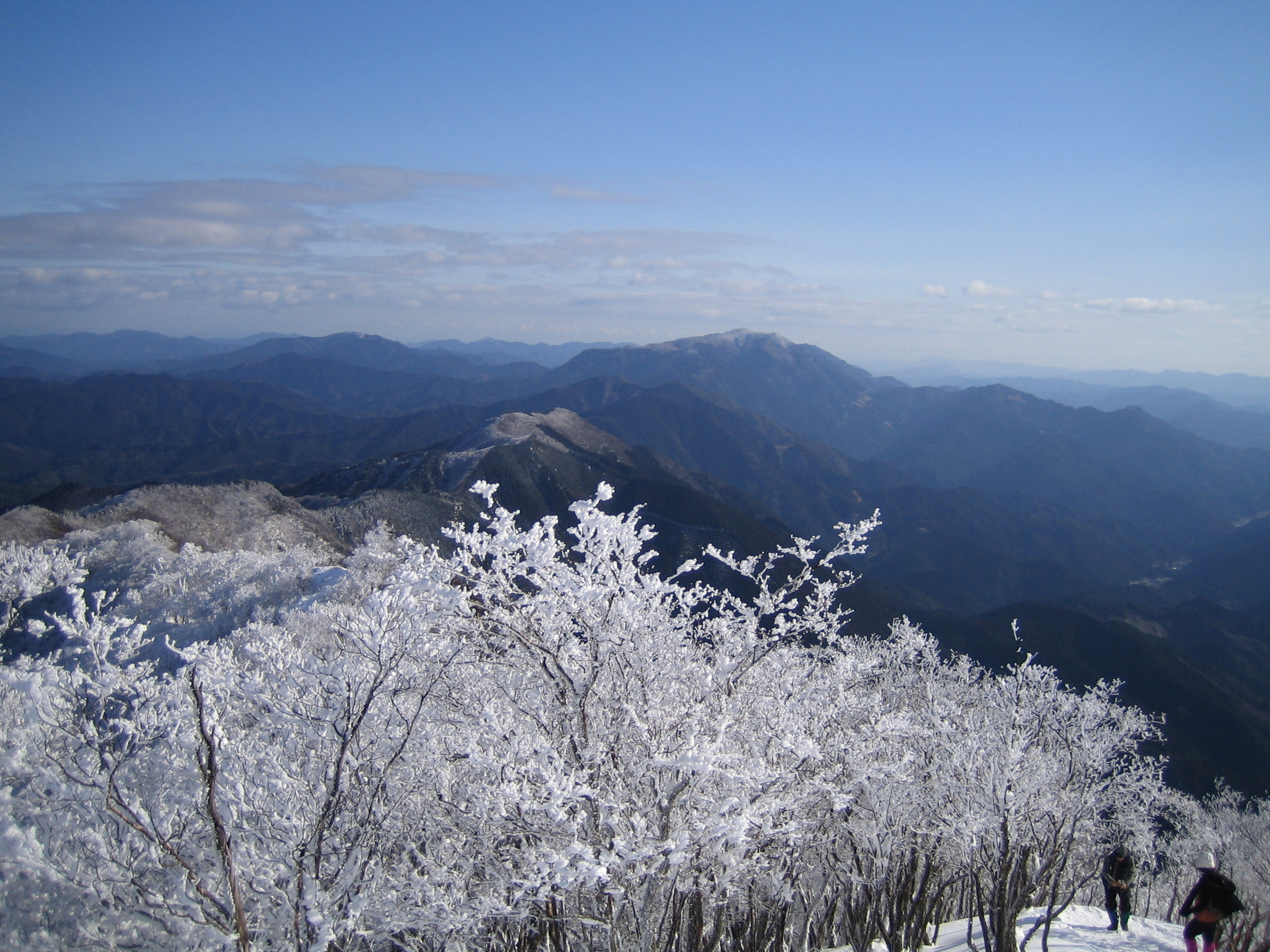
Eastside view of Mount Takami (January 2009)

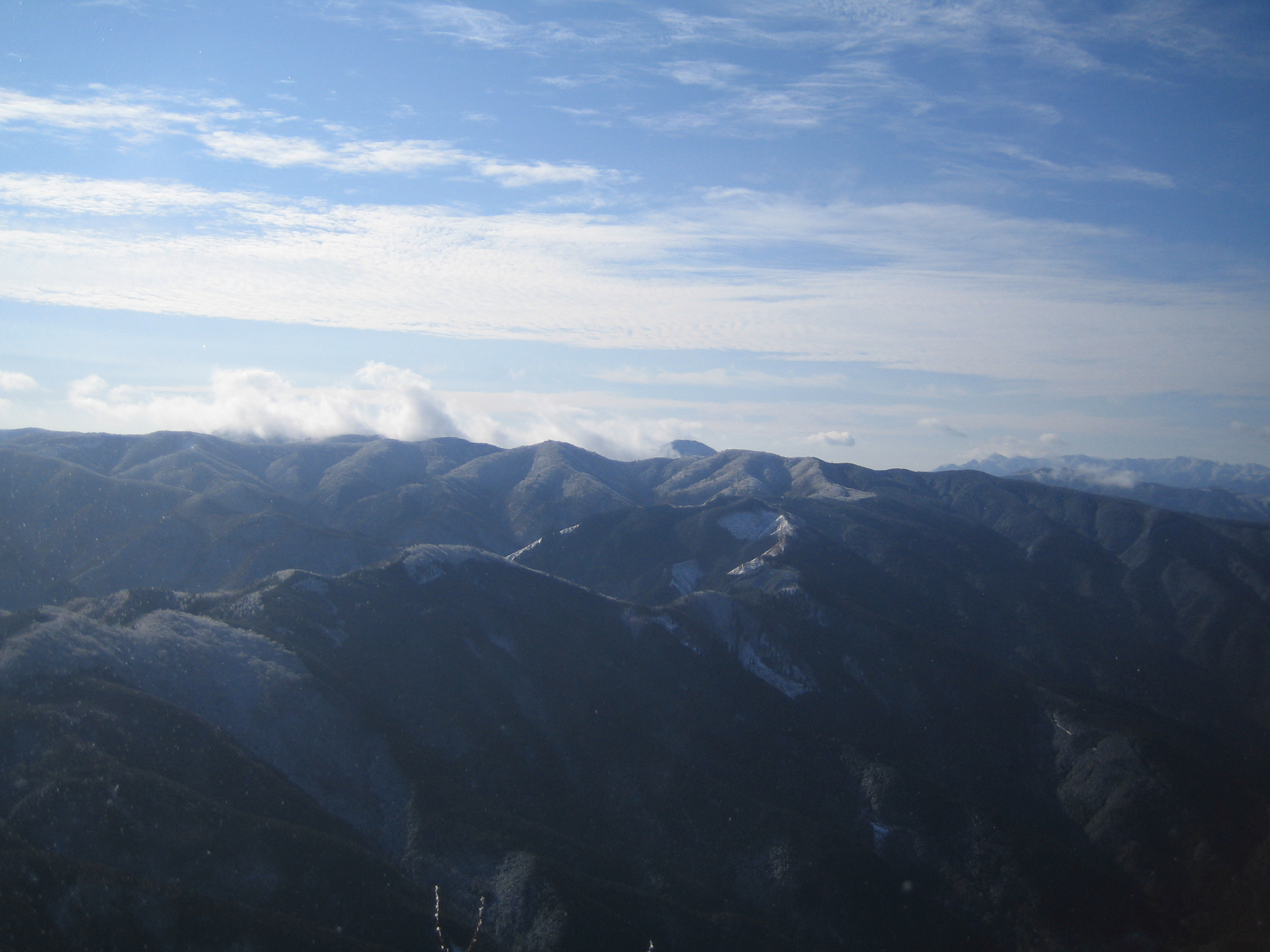
Daiko Mountains from Mount Takami (January 2009)

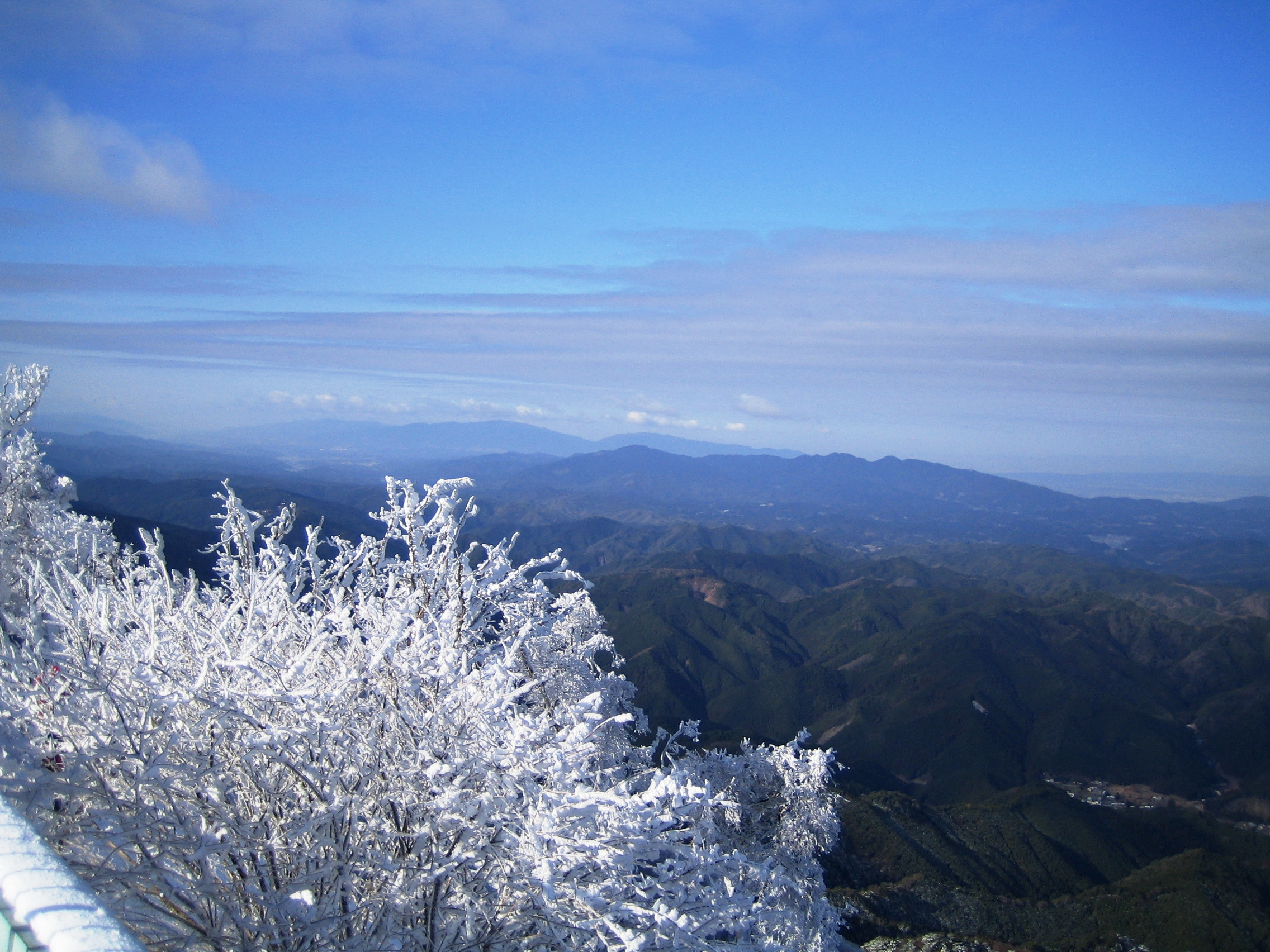
Katsuragi Mountains from Mount Takami (January 2009)

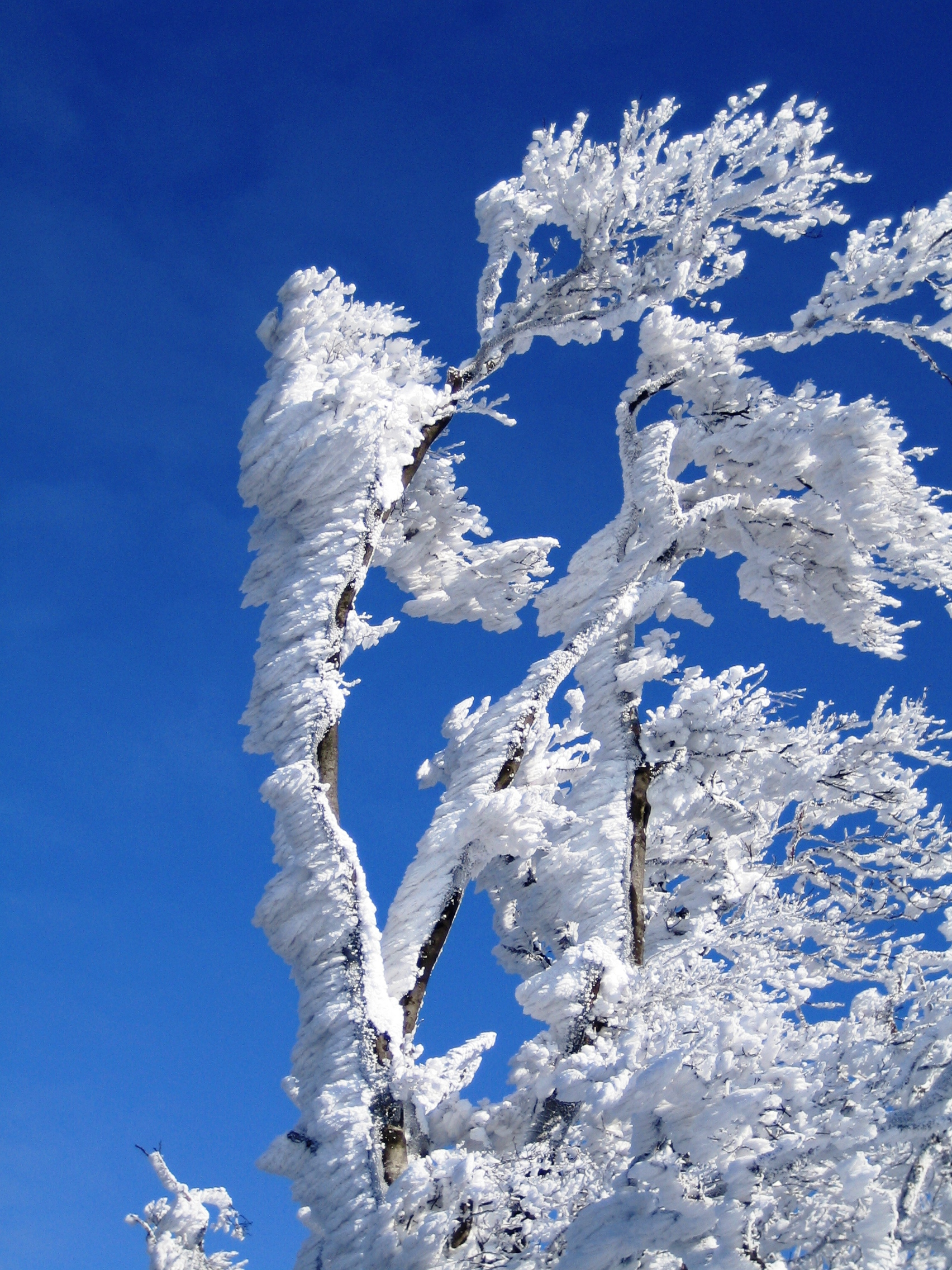
Frost on trees at the top of Mount Takami (1) (January 2009)

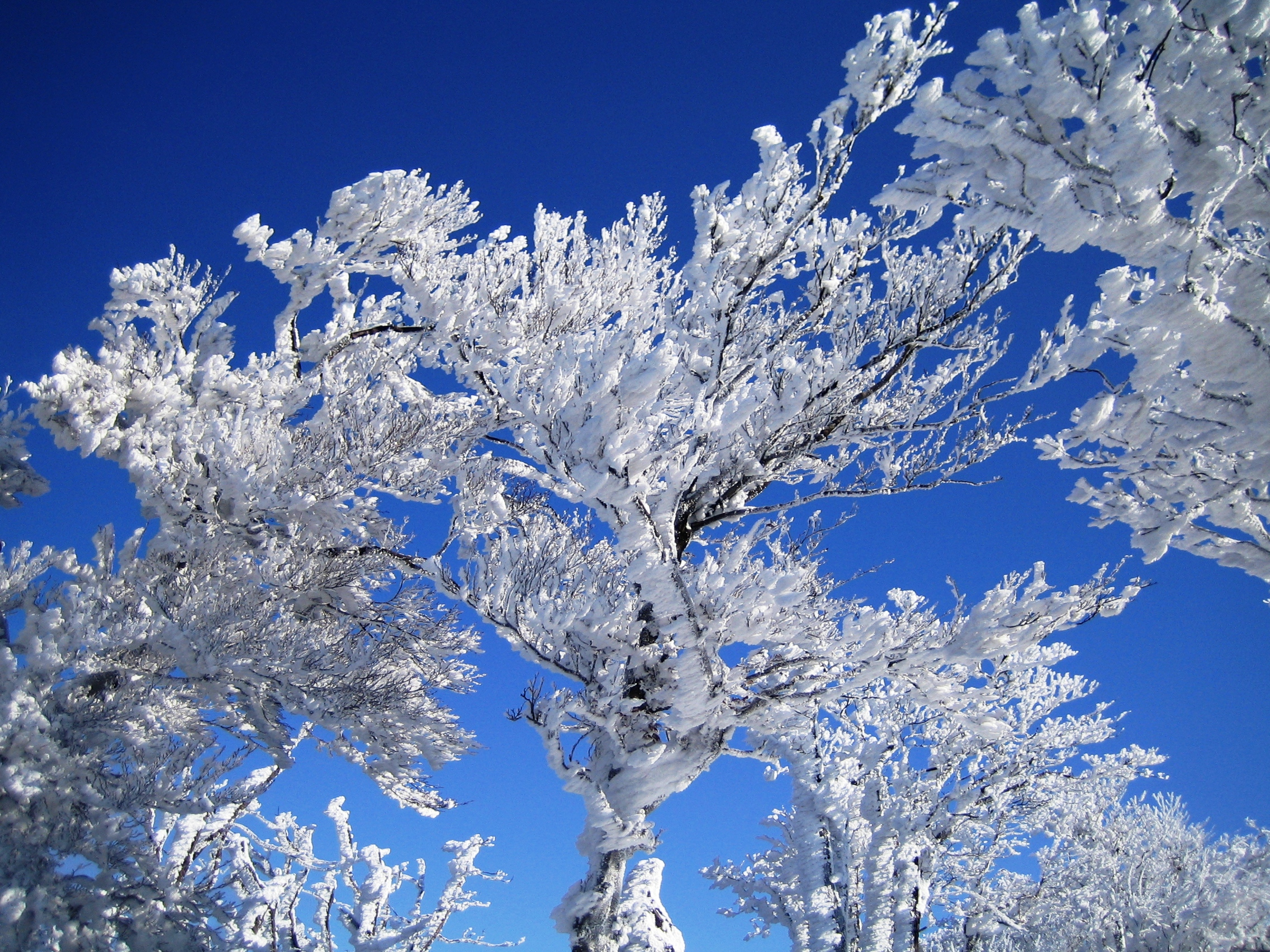
Frost on trees at the top of Mount Takami (2) (January 2009)

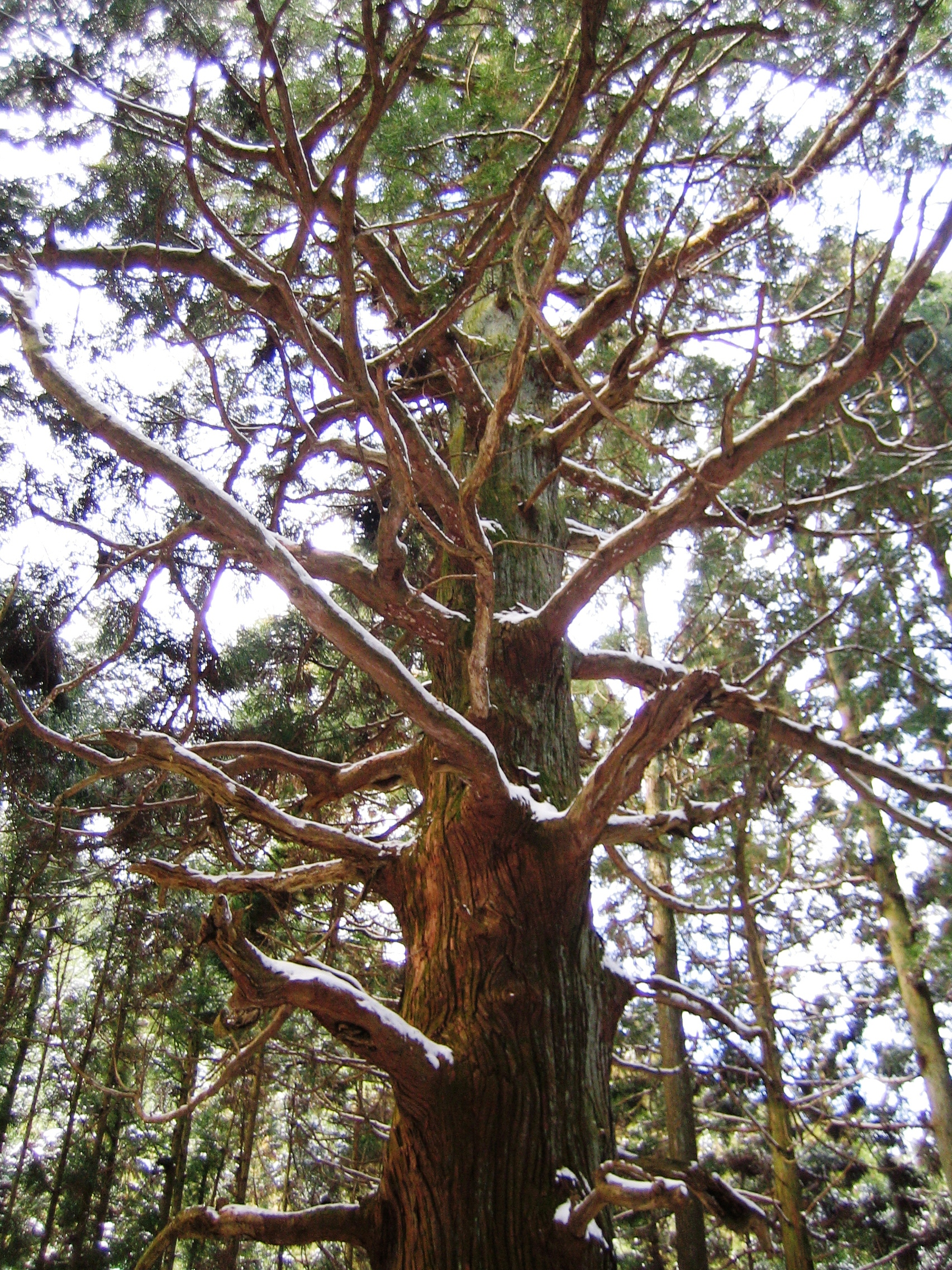
Takamisugi Cedar
