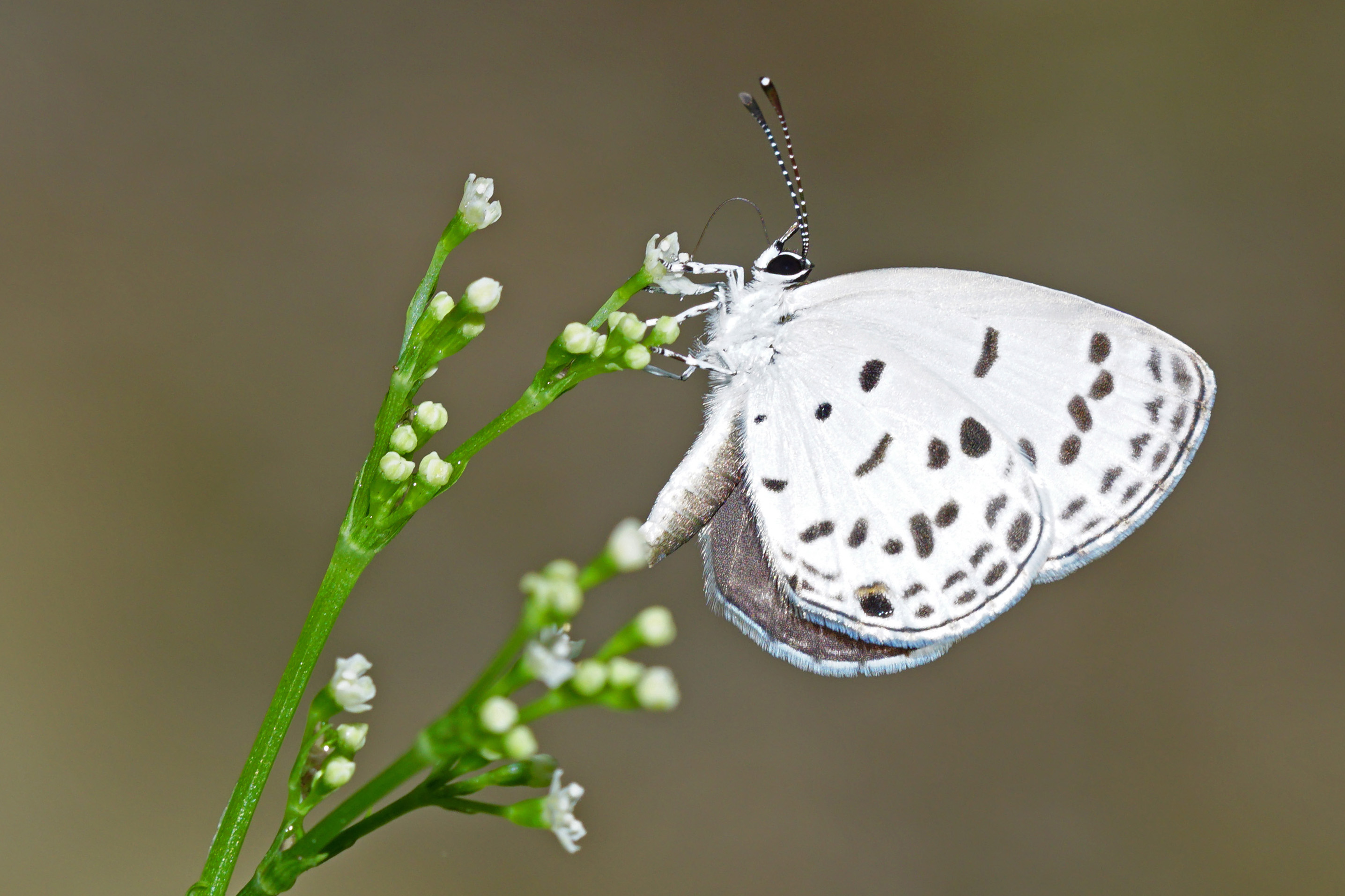

Scientific classification
- Domain: Eukaryota
- Kingdom: Animalia
- Phylum: Arthropoda
- Class: Insecta
- Order: Lepidoptera
- Family: Lycaenidae
- Genus: Shijimia
- Species: S. moorei

Binomial name
- Shijimia moorei (Leech, 1889)

= Shijimia moorei =

Moore's Cupid

Species of butterfly

Shijimia moorei, the Moore's Cupid, is a small butterfly found in India that belongs to the lycaenids or blues family. It is found from Assam to Indo China and Japan.

== Taxonomy ==
- S. m. moorei Yunnan
- S. m. taiwana Matsumura, 1919 Taiwan

== Biology ==
The larva on feeds on Lysionotus pauciflorus

== See also ==
- List of butterflies of India (Lycaenidae)
