= Mount Kunimi (Daikō) =

- 国見山

Highest point
- Elevation: 1,418.7 m (4,655 ft)
- Listing: List of mountains and hills of Japan by height
- Coordinates: 34°22′33″N 136°5′12″E

Geography
- Location: On the border of Higashiyoshino, Nara, and Matsusaka, Mie, Japan
- Parent range: Daikō Mountains

Mount Kunimi (国見山, Kunimi-san) is a 1,418.7 m (4,655 ft) tall mountain of the Daikō Mountains. It is located on the border of Higashiyoshino, Nara, and Matsusaka, Mie, Japan
