= Niukawakami Shrine =

Shinto shrine in Nara, Japan

Niukawakami Shrine 丹生川上神社
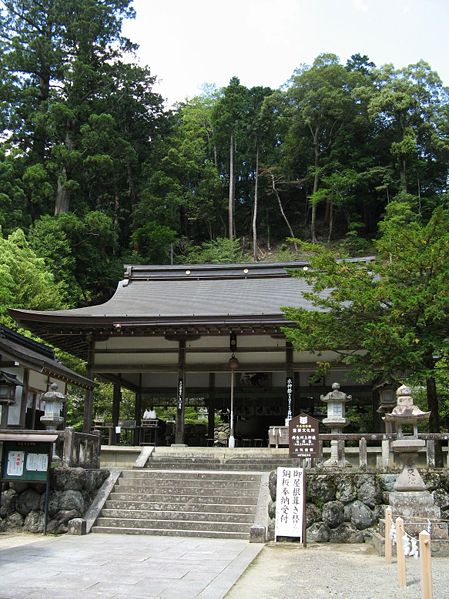
- Niukawakami Shrine at Nara in Japan.

- Location within Japan

Religion
- Affiliation: Shinto
- Deity: Mizuhanome
- Festival: 16 October

Location
- Location: 968 Ōaza Omura; Higashiyoshino Yoshino District; Nara prefecture
- Interactive map of Niukawakami Shrine 丹生川上神社
- Coordinates: 34°23′25″N 135°59′11″E

Architecture
- Style: Nagare-zukuri
- Established: 675

Website
- www.niukawakami-jinja.jp

Niukawakami Shrine (丹生川上神社, Niukawakami Jinja), also known as Nibukawakami Jinja, is a Shinto shrine located at Higashiyoshino in Nara, Japan.

== History ==
The shrine became the object of Imperial patronage during the early Heian period. In 965, Emperor Murakami ordered that Imperial messengers were sent to report important events to the guardian kami of Japan. These heihaku were initially presented to 16 shrines including the Niukawakami Shrine.

From 1871 through 1946, the Nibukawakami Jinja was officially designated one of the Kanpei-taisha (官幣大社), meaning that it stood in the first rank of government supported shrines.

== Composition ==
The shrine has two sub-shrines

- Niukawakami Upper Shrine
- Niukawakami Lower Shrine

== See also ==
- List of Shinto shrines
- Twenty-Two Shrines
- Modern system of ranked Shinto Shrines
