= Soni, Nara =

Soni 曽爾村
- Village
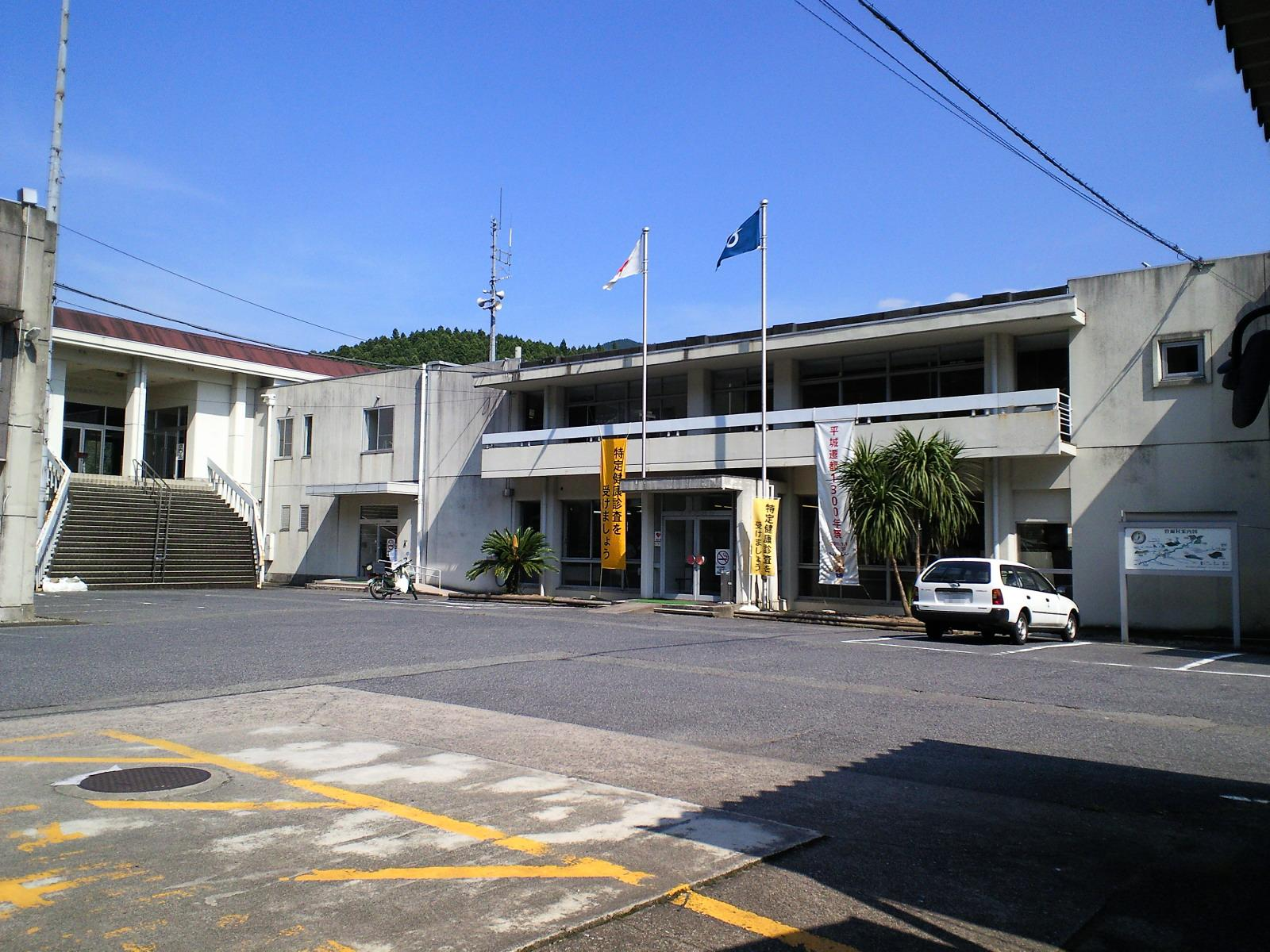
- Soni Village Office

- Flag Seal
- Location of Soni in Nara Prefecture

- Location in Japan
- Coordinates: 34°30′38″N 136°7′29″E
- Country: Japan
- Region: Kansai
- Prefecture: Nara
- District: Uda

Government
  - Mayor: Yoshinori Uyama

Area
  - Total: 47.76 km^{2} (18.44 sq mi)

Population (October 1, 2024)
  - Total: 1,272
  - Density: 26.63/km^{2} (68.98/sq mi)
- Time zone: UTC+09:00 (JST)
- City hall address: 495-1 Ōaza Imai, Soni-mura, Uda-gun, Nara-ken 633-1212
- Website: Official website
- Symbols
- Bird: Japanese white-eye
- Flower: Azalea
- Tree: Cryptomeria

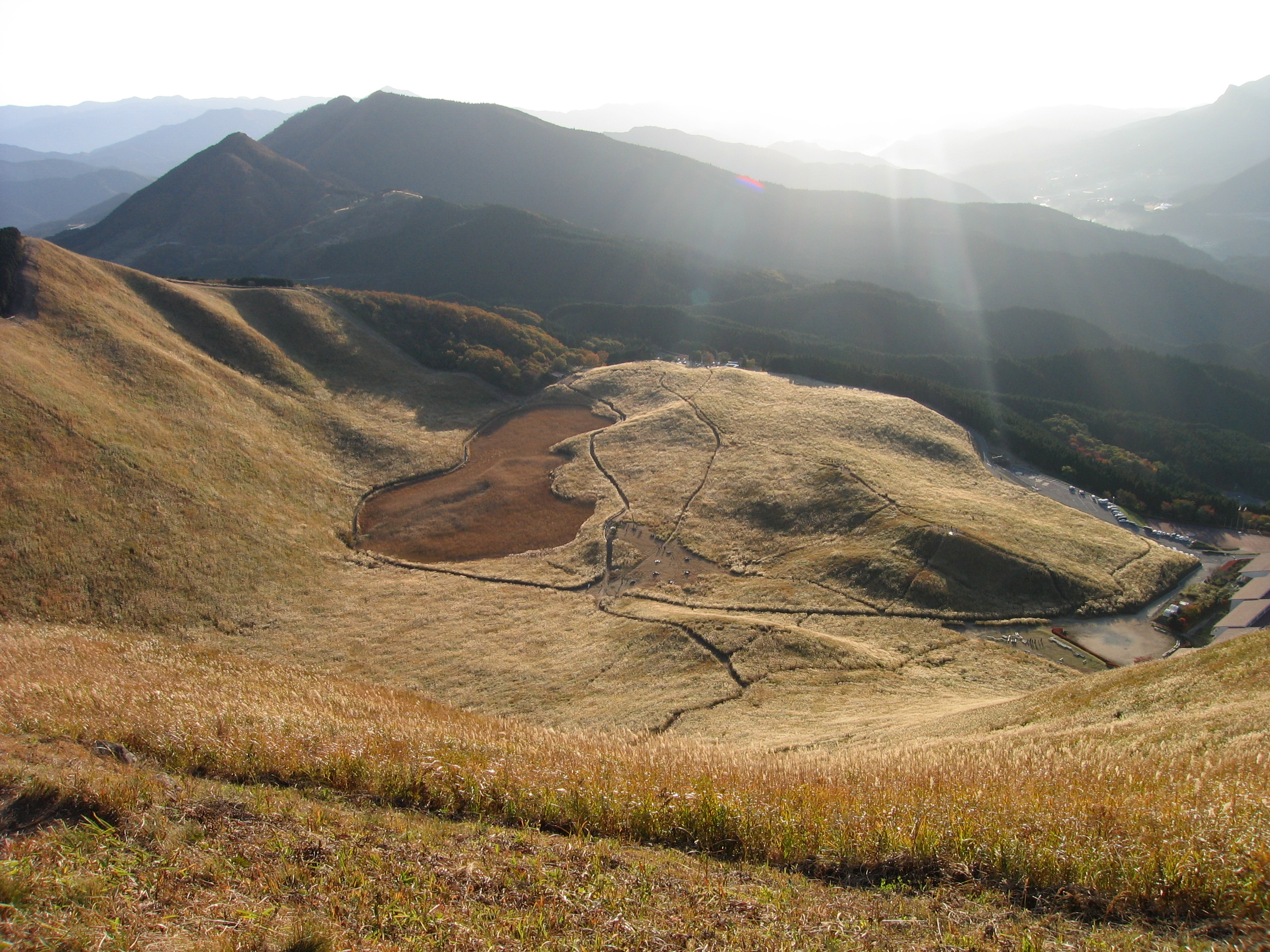
Soni Plateau

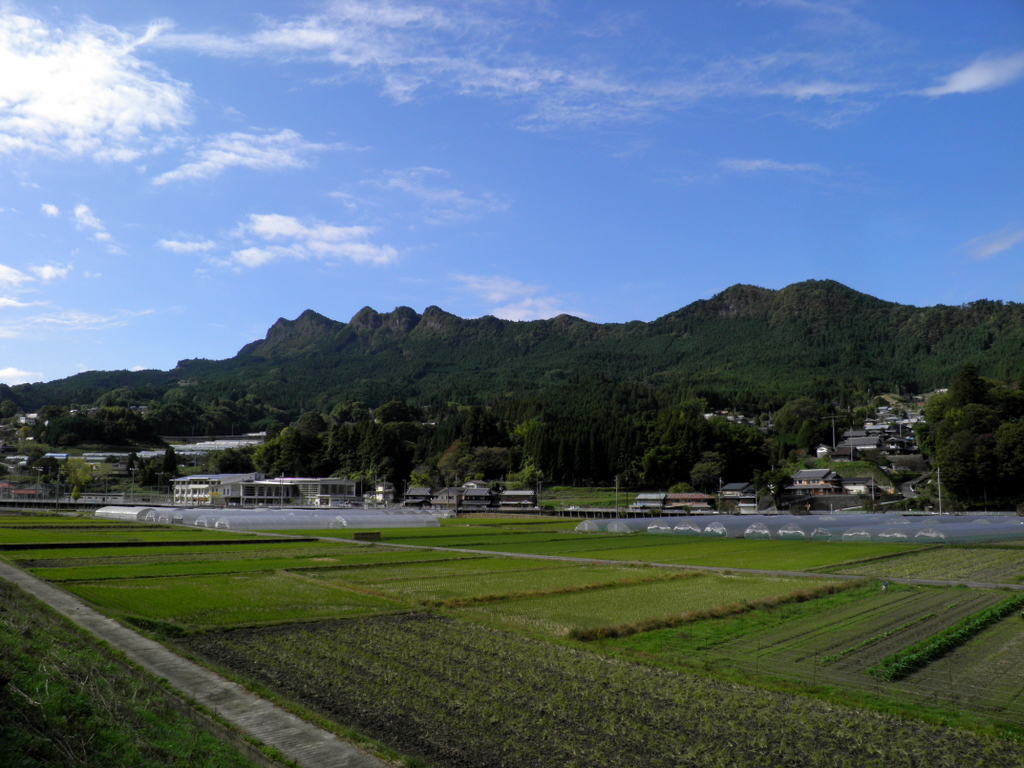
Soni Village

Soni (曽爾村, Soni-mura) is a village located in Uda District, Nara Prefecture, Japan. As of 1 October 2024, the village had an estimated population of 1,272 in 639 households, and a population density of 27 persons per km^{2}. The total area of the village is 47.76 km^{2} (18.44 sq mi). The village has been designated one of The Most Beautiful Villages in Japan by The Most Beautiful Villages in the World association.

== Geography ==
Soni is located in the mountains of far eastern Nara Prefecture, sitting right next to the border with Mie Prefecture, The settlements are found mainly on the valley floor plains and gentle mountain slopes along the north-flowing Shorenji River.

=== Neighboring municipalities ===
Nara Prefecture

- Uda
- Mitsue
- Higashiyoshino

Mie Prefecture

- Tsu
- Nabari

=== Climate ===
Soni has a humid subtropical climate (Köppen Cfa) characterized by warm summers and cool winters with light to no snowfall. The average annual temperature in Soni is 12.2 °C. The average annual rainfall is 1893 mm with September as the wettest month. The temperatures are highest on average in August, at around 23.8 °C, and lowest in January, at around 0.7 °C.

=== Demographics ===
Per Japanese census data, the population of Soni is as shown below:

Historical population
| Year | Pop. | ±% |
|---|---|---|
| 1950 | 4,352 | — |
| 1960 | 4,433 | +1.9% |
| 1970 | 3,189 | −28.1% |
| 1980 | 3,083 | −3.3% |
| 1990 | 2,743 | −11.0% |
| 2000 | 2,472 | −9.9% |
| 2010 | 1,895 | −23.3% |
| 2020 | 1,295 | −31.7% |

== History ==
The area of Soni is part of ancient Yamato Province. It appears in Nara period texts such as the Kojiki and "Sonui" and the Nihon Shoki as "Soiyama", and the Wamyō Ruijushō as "Uda-gun Nuribe-go." It was noted for its Japanese lacquerware production. In modern times, most of the native urushi trees have been cut down and replaced by Cryptomeria and hinoki cypress trees, but attempts are being made by volunteers to revive the lacquer production. The village of Soni was established on April 1, 1889 with the creation of the modern municipalities system.

== Government ==
Soni has a mayor-council form of government with a directly elected mayor and a unicameral village council of eight members. Soni, collectively with the other municipalities of Uda District contributes one member to the Nara Prefectural Assembly. In terms of national politics, the town is part of the Nara 3rd district of the lower house of the Diet of Japan.

== Economy ==
The main economic activity of Soni is agriculture. The area is noted for its spinach crop, producing roughly 285 tons of spinach annually, utilizing 37 hectares of dedicated farmland. This output positions the small mountainous village as the 3rd largest spinach producer in Nara Prefecture and ranks it 39th nationwide out of more than 1,700 municipalities.

== Education ==
Soni has one combined elementary/middle school operated by the village government. The village does not have a high school.

== Transportation ==
=== Railways ===
Soni has no passenger railway service. The nearest train station is Haibara Station or Nabari Station on the Kintetsu Railway Osaka Line.

=== Highway ===
- National Route 369

== Local attractions ==
- Byōbu-iwa
- Koochi Valley
- Soni Plateau
- Soni Plateau Hot Springs
- Ise Hon Kaidō, National Historic Site
