= Higashiyoshino, Nara =

Higashiyoshino 東吉野村
- Village
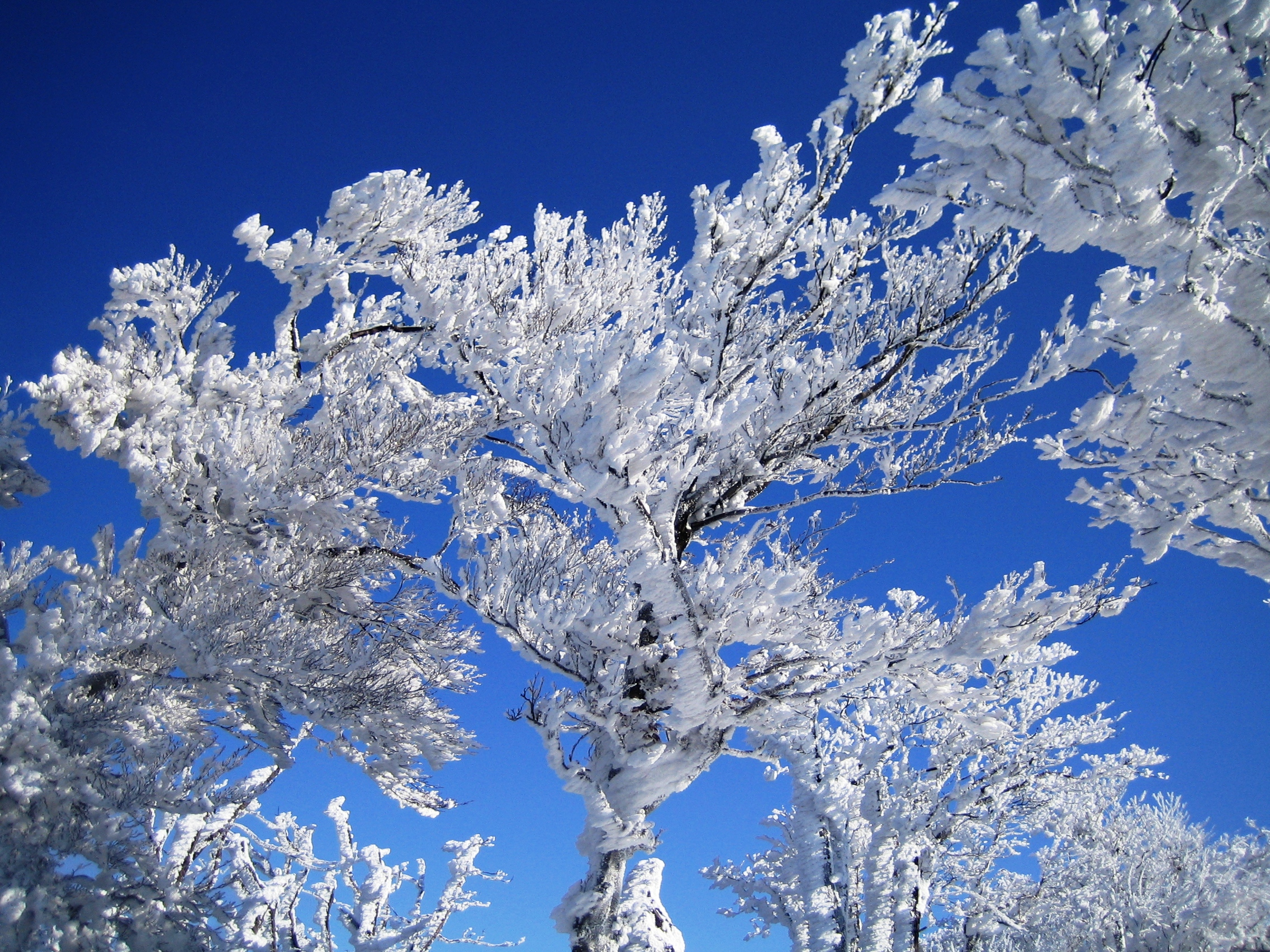

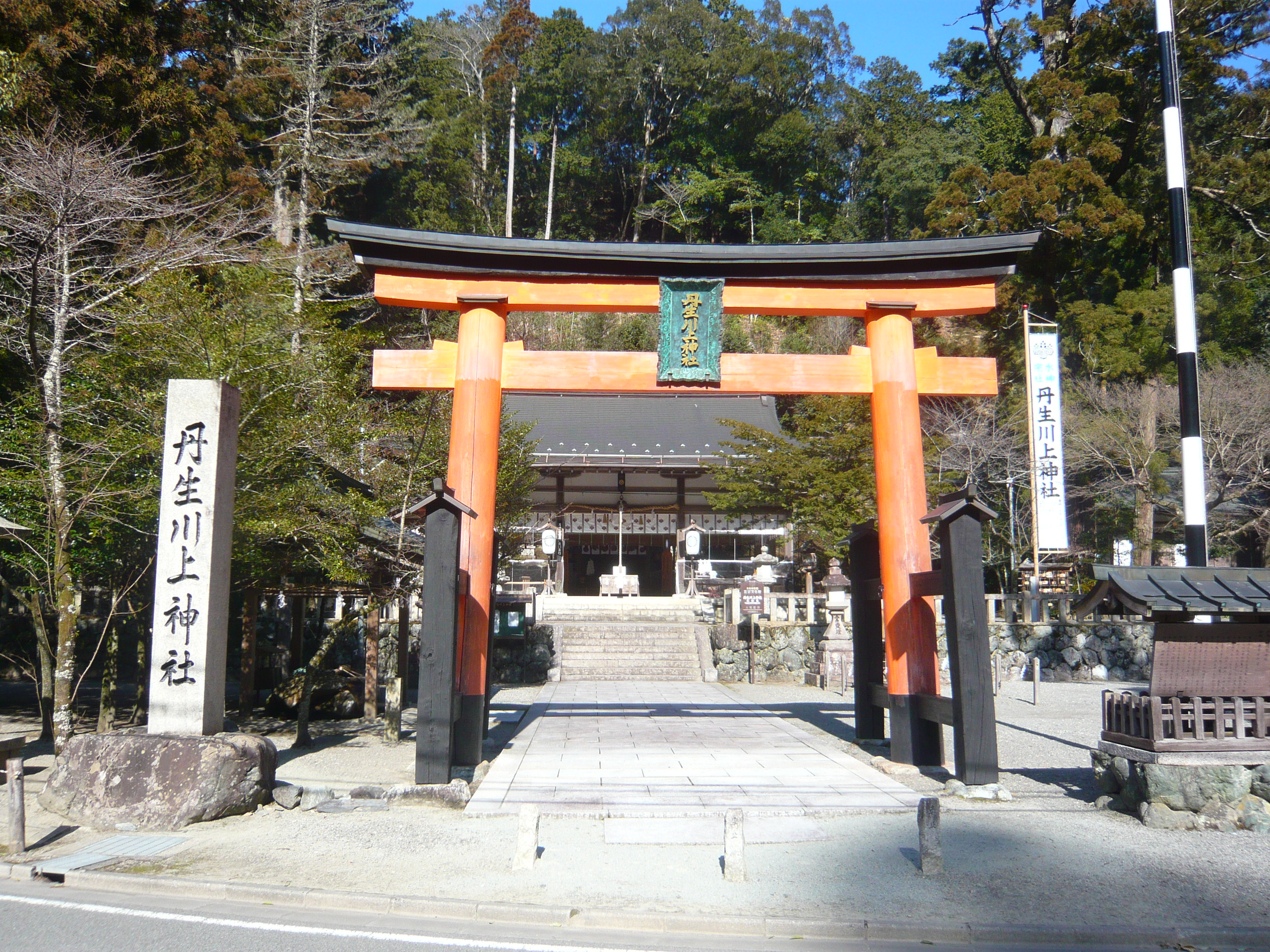

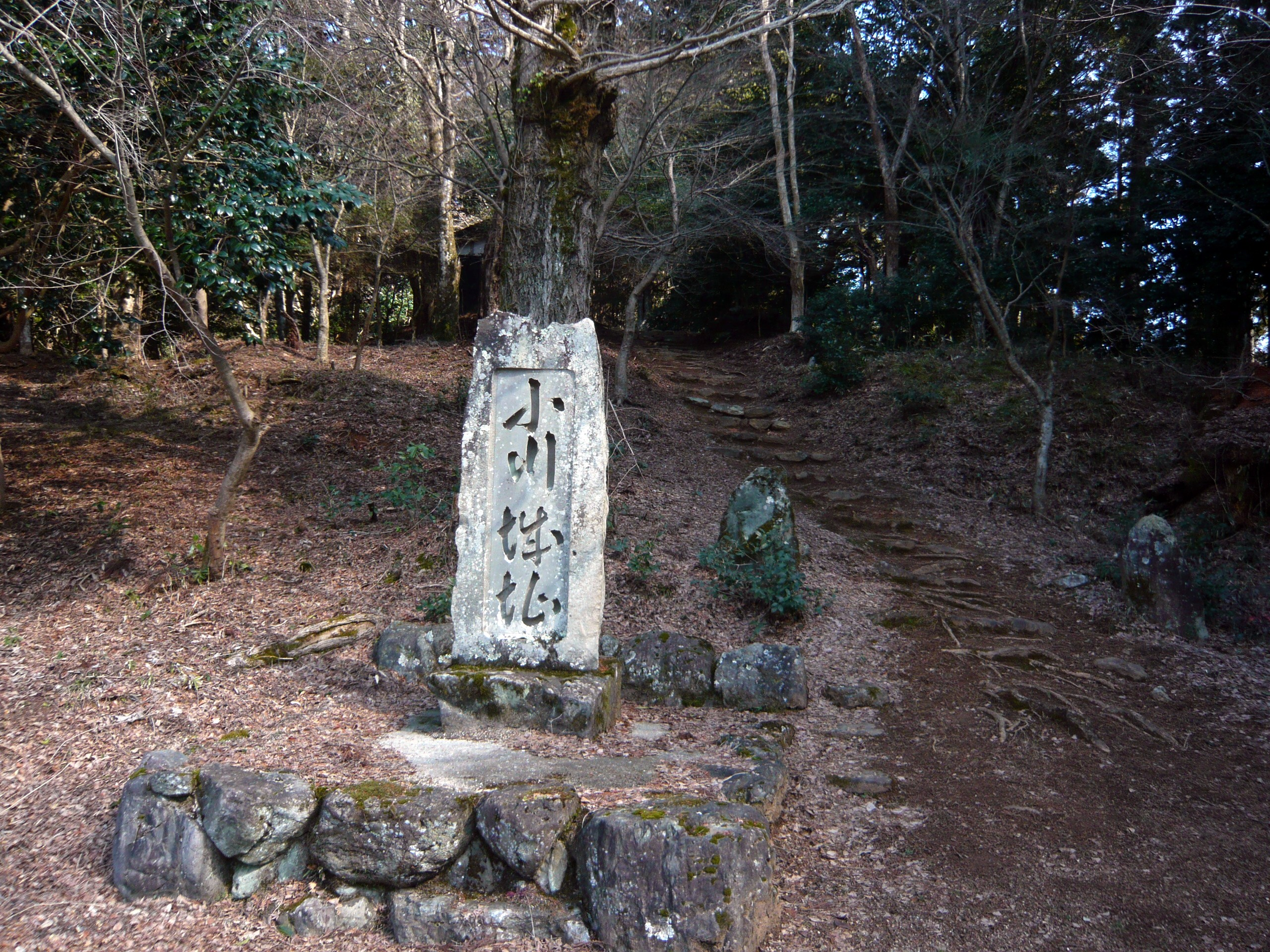

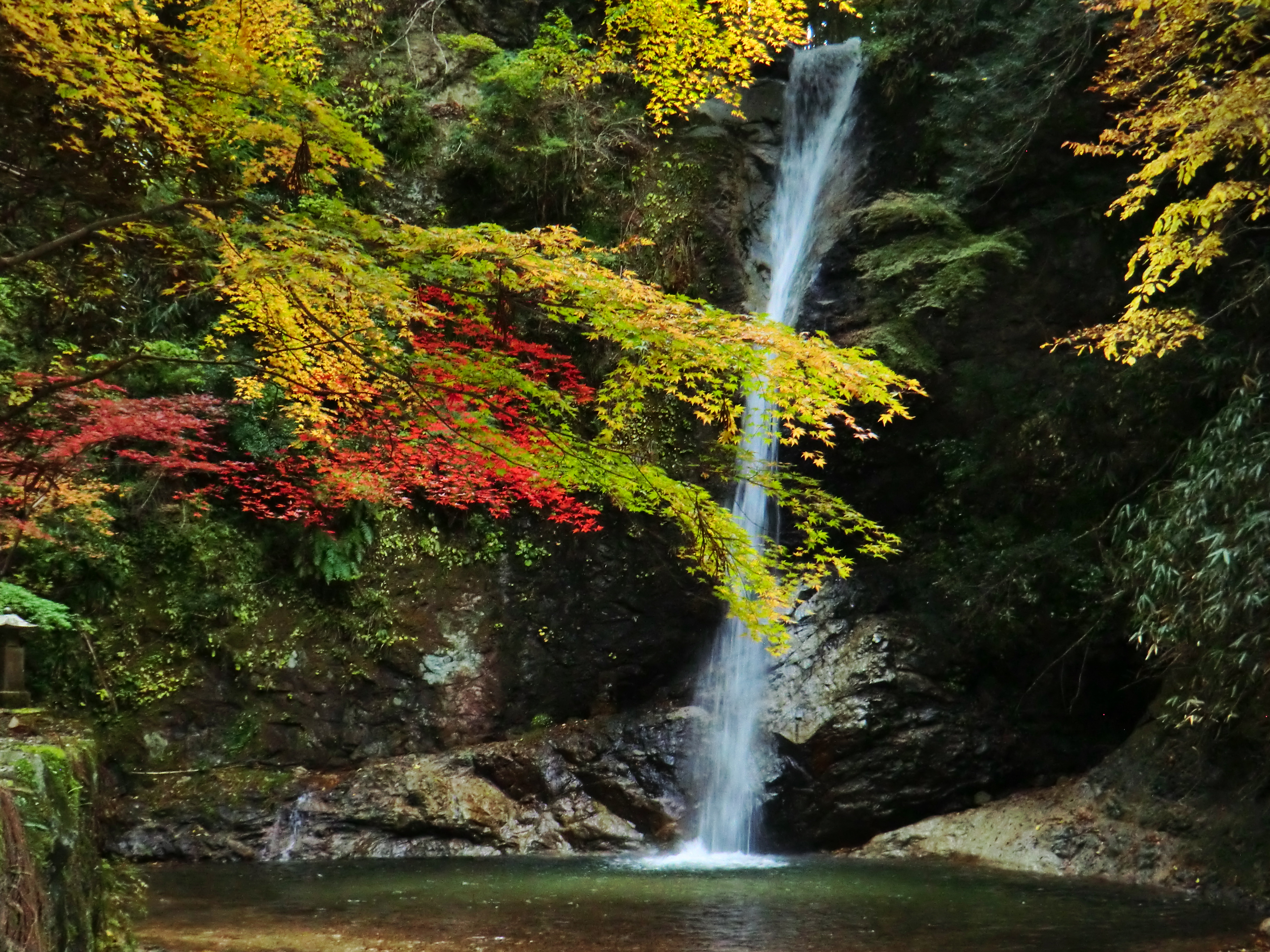
Mount Takami	Niukawakami Shrine
Ogawa Castle ruins	Nageishi Falls
- Flag Chapter
- Interactive map of Higashiyoshino
- Location in Japan
- Coordinates: 34°24′12″N 135°58′06″E
- Country: Japan
- Region: Kansai
- Prefecture: Nara
- District: Yoshino

Area
  - Total: 131.65 km^{2} (50.83 sq mi)

Population (January 1, 2025)
  - Total: 1,322
  - Density: 10.04/km^{2} (26.01/sq mi)
- Time zone: UTC+09:00 (JST)
- City hall address: 99 Ōaza Ogawa, Higashiyoshino-mura, Yoshino-gun, Nara-ken 633-2492
- Website: Official website

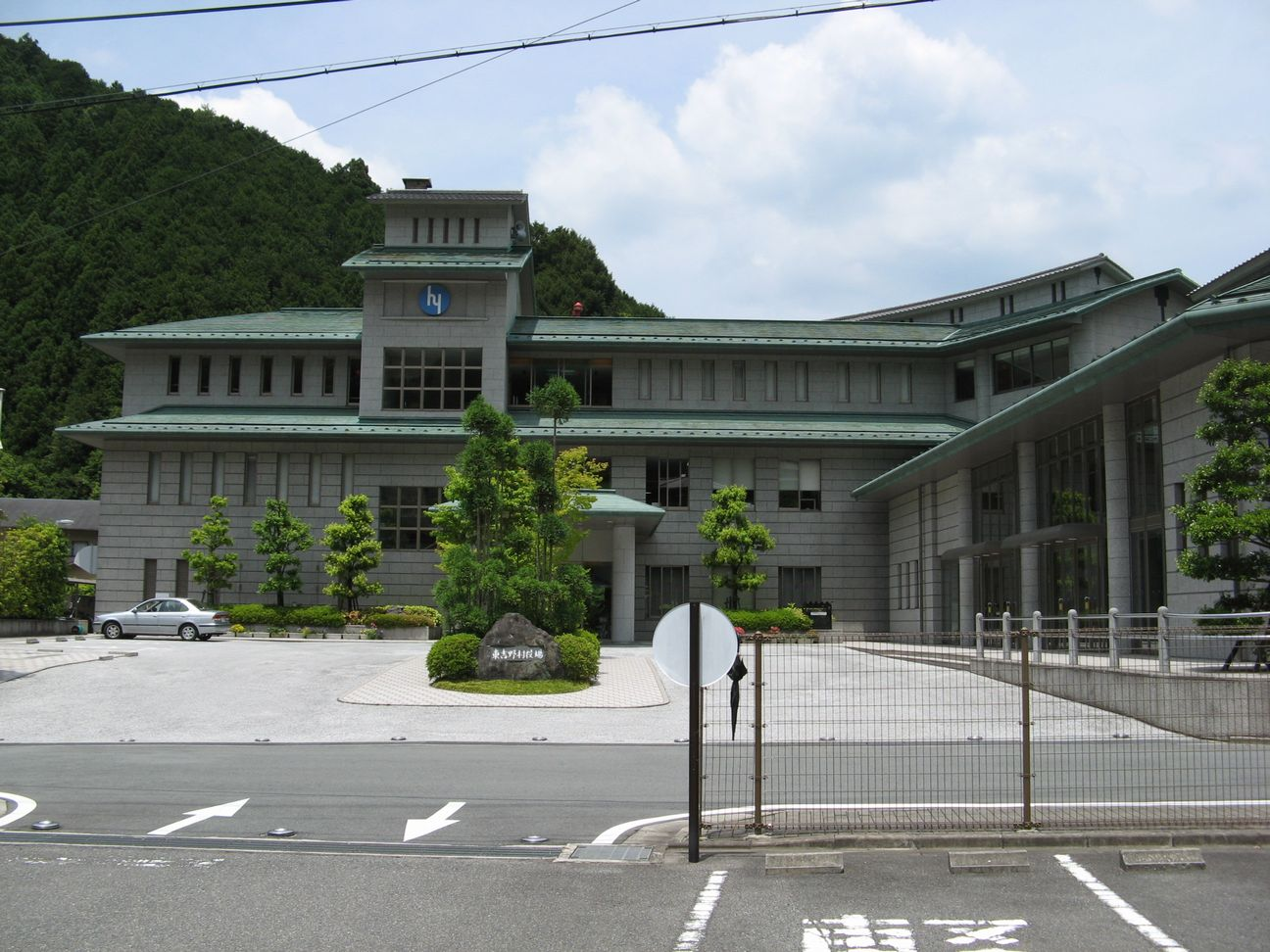
Higashiyoshino Village Office

Higashiyoshino (東吉野村, Higashiyoshino-mura) is a village located in Yoshino District, Nara Prefecture, Japan. As of 1 January 2025, the village had an estimated population of 1,322 and a population density of 10 persons per km^{2}. The total area of the village is 131.65 km^{2} (50.83 sq mi). It is where the last Japanese wolf was shot and killed on January 23, 1905. It is now kept as a specimen at the British Museum.

== Geography ==
Located in central Nara Prefecture, the majority of the village terrain is mountainous. Mount Kunimi, at 1419 meters, is the highest mountain in the village. There are other mountains, such as Mount Takami, at 1248 meters, situated in the western portion of Higashiyoshino.

- Rivers: Yoshino River
- Mountains: Mount Kunimi, Mount Takami

=== Surrounding municipalities ===
Mie Prefecture

- Matsusaka

Nara Prefecture

- Kawakami
- Mitsue
- Soni
- Uda
- Yoshino

=== Climate ===
Higashiyoshino has a humid subtropical climate (Köppen Cfa) characterized by warm summers and cool winters with light to no snowfall. The average annual temperature in Higashiyoshino is 11.9 °C. The average annual rainfall is 1893 mm with September as the wettest month. The temperatures are highest on average in August, at around 23.5 °C, and lowest in January, at around 0.3 °C.

=== Demographics ===
Per Japanese census data, the population of Higashiyoshino is as shown below:

Historical population
Year	Pop.	±%
1940	7,184	—
1950	8,268	+15.1%
1960	9,221	+11.5%
1970	7,028	−23.8%
1980	4,916	−30.1%
1990	3,723	−24.3%
2000	2,909	−21.9%
2010	2,143	−26.3%
2020	1,502	−29.9%

== History ==
The area of Higashiyoshino was part of ancient Yamato Province. The villages of Ogawa, Takami, and Shigo were established on April 1, 1889, with the creation of the modern municipalities system. On March 1, 1958, the three villages merged to form the village of Higashiyoshino.

== Government ==
Higashiyoshino has a mayor-council form of government with a directly elected mayor and a unicameral village council of eight members. Higashiyoshino, collectively with the other municipalities of Yoshino District, contributes two members to the Nara Prefectural Assembly. In terms of national politics, the village is part of the Nara 3rd district of the lower house of the Diet of Japan.

== Economy ==
The local economy is based on agriculture and forestry.

== Education ==
Higashiyoshino has one public elementary school and one public junior high school operated by the village government. The village does not have a high school.

== Transportation ==
=== Railways ===
Higashiyoshino has no passenger railway service. The nearest train station is Haibara Station on the Kintetsu Osaka Line in Uda.

=== Highways ===
- National Route 166

== Local attractions ==
- Niukawakami Shrine
