= List of mergers in Nara Prefecture =

Here is a list of mergers in Nara Prefecture, Japan since the Heisei era.

== Mergers from April 1, 1999 to Present ==
- On October 1, 2004 - the towns of Shinjō and Taima (both from Kitakatsuragi District) were merged to create the city of Katsuragi.
- On April 1, 2005 - the village of Tsuge (from Yamabe District), and the village of Tsukigase (from Soekami District) were merged into the expanded city of Nara. Soekami District was dissolved as a result of this merger.
- On September 25, 2005 - the villages of Nishiyoshino and Ōtō (both from Yoshino District) were merged into the expanded city of Gojō.
- On January 1, 2006 - the towns of Haibara, Ōuda and Utano, and the village of Murō (all from Uda District) were merged to create the city of Uda.
