= Morino physic garden =

Physic garden in Japan

- 森野旧薬園 (Japanese)
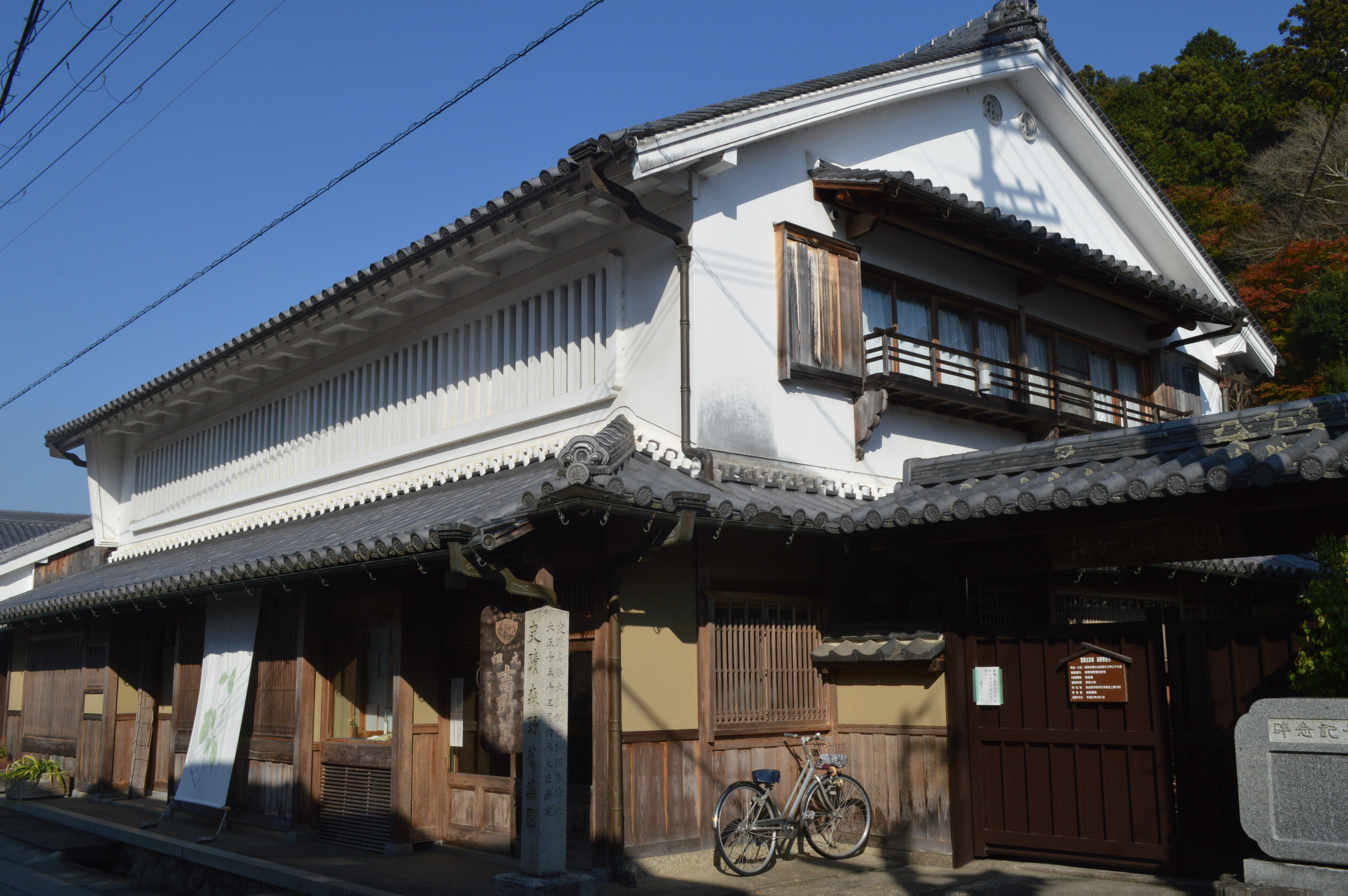
- Morino physic garden

- Shimabara Domain Morino physic garden (Japan)
- Interactive map of Morino physic garden
- 34°28′41″N 135°55′58″E
- Type: botanic garden
- Periods: Edo period
- Location: Uda, Nara, Japan
- Region: Kinki region

Site notes
- Public access: Yes

The Morino physic garden (森野旧薬園, Morino Yakuen) was an Edo period physic garden, located in the Ōuda neighborhood of the city of Uda, Nara Prefecture Japan. The site was designated a National Historic Site of Japan in 1926, with the area under protection expanded in 1931. Along with the Shimabara Domain Physic Garden in Shimabara and Sata physic gardens in Kagoshima it is regarded as one of the three major pre-modern botanical gardens in Japan.

== Overview ==
The Morino physic garden is located at the western foot of Furushiroyama, where Akiyama Castle (Uda Matsuyama Castle) was located in the Sengoku and early Edo period. The gentle slope with a wide view receives plenty of sunlight, is a good location with good soil and drainage, and is located within the Morino family residence, which had been manufacturing Kudzu powder for generations. Morino Tosuke, the founder of the botanical garden, was born in 1690 and in 1729 became an apprentice for collecting medicinal plants to Uemura Saheiji, who was a medicinal herb supplier to the Tokugawa shogunate. Herbal plant collection took about four months, covering the various peaks of Yoshino, Mount Takami, and Mount Kongo. While gathering herbs, he discovered dogtooth violets, which prompted him to start producing katakuriko flour alongside producing kudzu starch. He continued gathering herbs thereafter, and his area of operation expanded from Kinki to Tokai and Hokuriku regions. During that time, he planted medicinal plant seeds provided by the shogunate in the mountains behind his house, which was the beginning of the botanical garden. This early modern botanical garden has retained its original form into the modern era. At present, approximately 250 varieties of medicinal plants are planted here.

== See also ==
- List of Historic Sites of Japan (Nara)
