= Tsuge =

Tsuge may refer to:

- Buxus microphylla (Japanese Box or Littleleaf Box), a tree called Tsuge (つげ（黄楊、柘植、樿）) in Japanese.
- Tsuge, Nara (都祁村, Tsuge-mura), a village located in Yamabe District, Nara Prefecture, Japan.
- Tsuge, Mie (柘植町, Tsuge-cho) was a town located in Ayama District, Mie Prefecture, Japan.
- Tsuge Station (柘植駅, Tsuge-eki), a railway station in Iga, Mie Prefecture, Japan.
- JDS Tsuge (PF-292) (つげ (PF-292)), a Kusu-class patrol frigate of the Japan Maritime Self-Defense Force, formerly USS Gloucester (PF-22)
- Yoshiharu Tsuge (つげ義春, Tsuge Yoshiharu, born 1937), a Japanese cartoonist and essayist.
