= Yamazoe =

Yamazoe 山添村
- Village
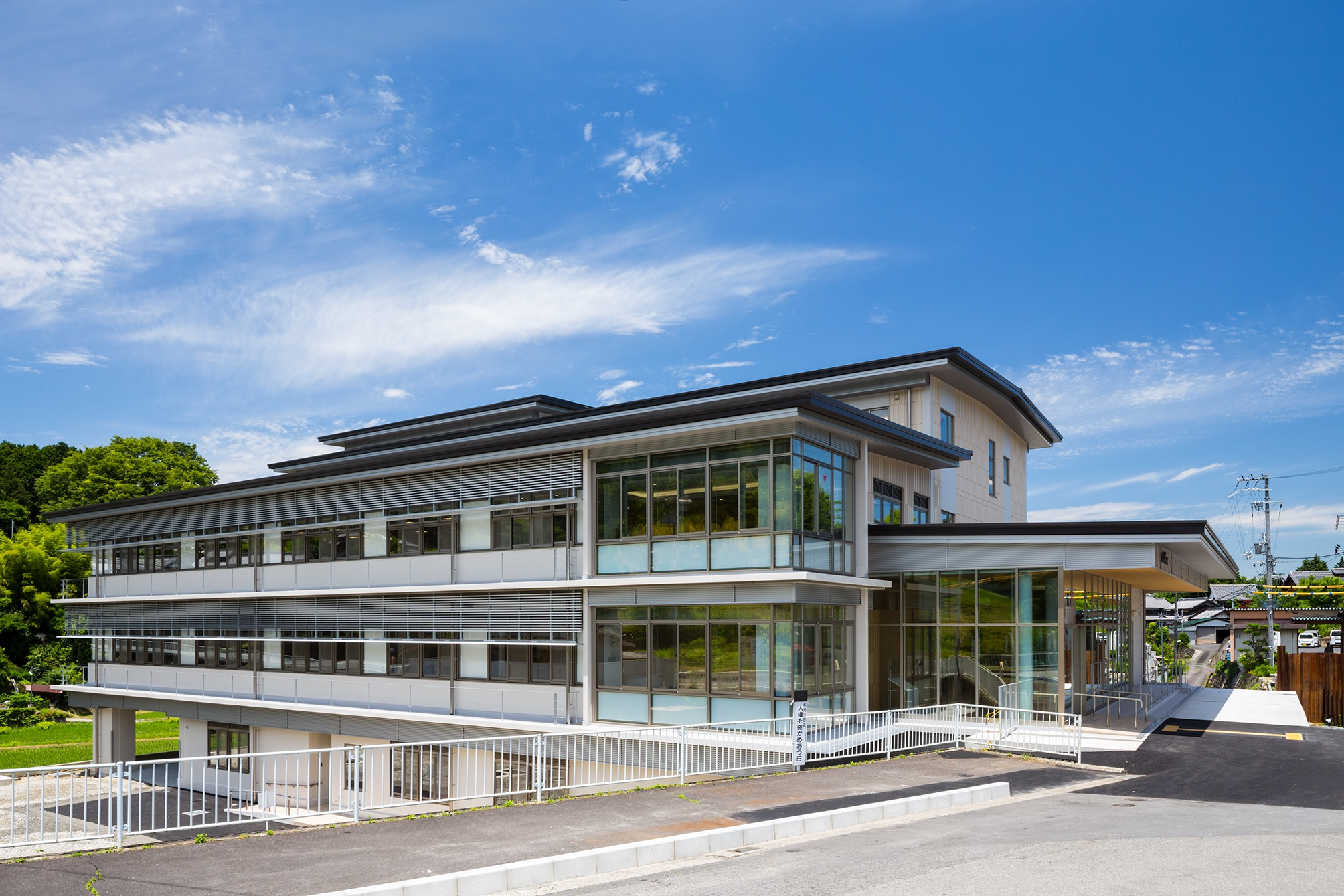
- Yamazoe Village Office

- Flag Seal

- Location in Japan
- Coordinates: 34°40′51″N 136°02′36″E
- Country: Japan
- Region: Kansai
- Prefecture: Nara
- District: Yamabe

Area
  - Total: 66.52 km^{2} (25.68 sq mi)

Population (August 31, 2024)
  - Total: 3,077
  - Density: 46.26/km^{2} (119.8/sq mi)
- Time zone: UTC+09:00 (JST)
- City hall address: 151 Ōaza Onishi, Yamazoe-mura, Yamabe-gun, Nara-ken >630-2344
- Website: Official website
- Symbols
- Flower: Azalea

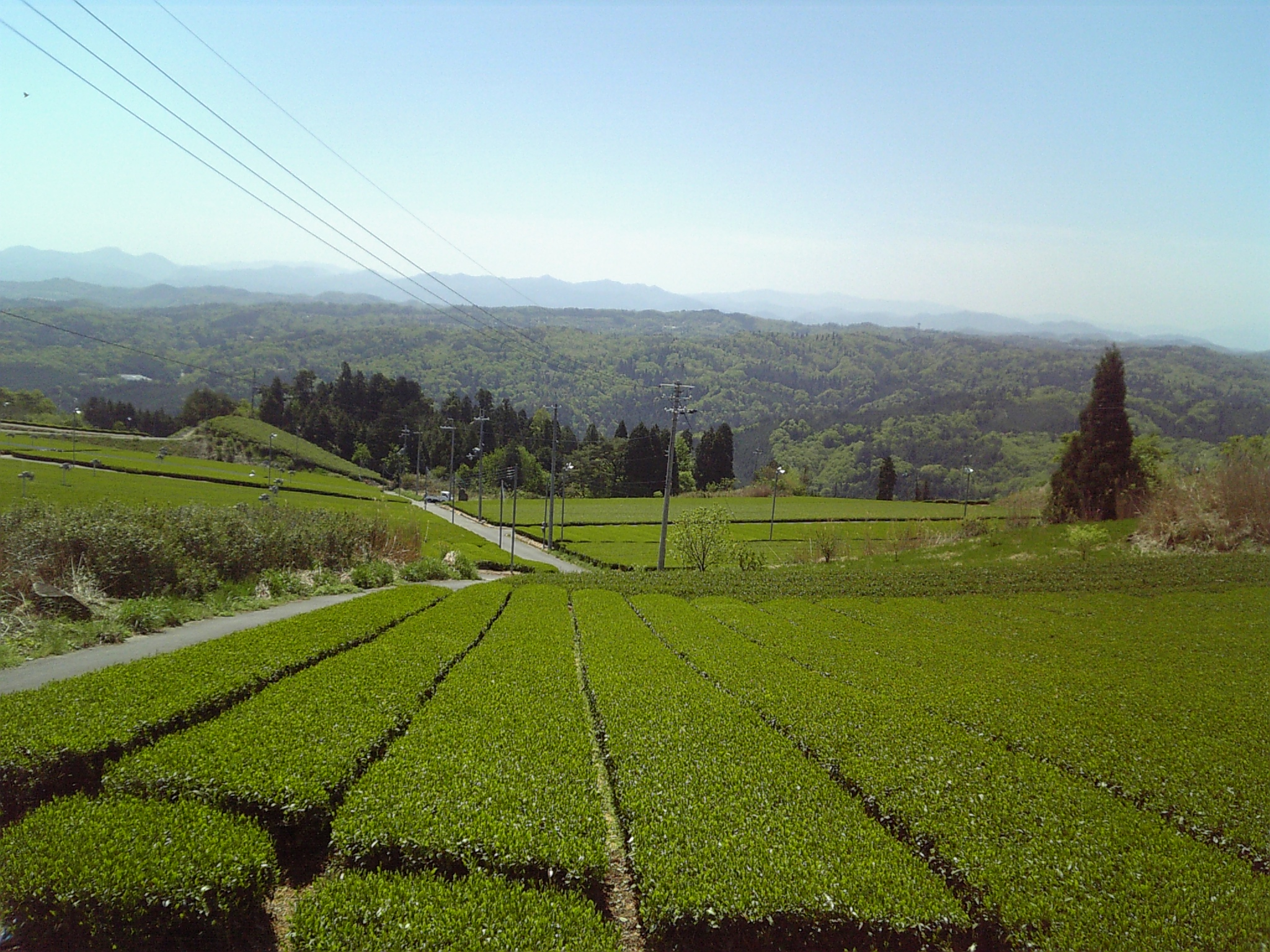
Yamato tea fields in Yamazoe

Yamazoe (山添村, Yamazoe-mura) is a village located in Yamabe District, Nara Prefecture, Japan. As of 31 August 2024, the village had an estimated population of 3,077 in 1,307 households, and a population density of 46 persons per km^{2}. The total area of the village is 66.52 km^{2} (25.68 sq mi).

== Geography ==
Yamazoeis a highland village located in the northeastern part of Nara Prefecture, on the border with Mie Prefecture. The prefecture-designated Place of Scenic Beauty, Mount Kouno, is the highest mountain. The Nabari River flows through the northeastern part of the village. The village has an elevation between 120 and 620 meters.

=== Surrounding municipalities ===
Mie Prefecture

- Iga
- Nabari

Nara Prefecture

- Nara
- Uda

=== Climate ===
Yamazoe has a humid subtropical climate (Köppen Cfa) characterized by warm summers and cool winters with light to no snowfall. The average annual temperature in Yamazoe is 13.7 °C. The average annual rainfall is 1439 mm with September as the wettest month. The temperatures are highest on average in August, at around 25.7 °C, and lowest in January, at around 2.2 °C.

=== Demographics ===
Per Japanese census data, the population of Yamazoe is as shown below

Historical population
Year	Pop.	±%
1960	6,807	—
1970	5,978	−12.2%
1980	5,822	−2.6%
1990	5,773	−0.8%
2000	4,967	−14.0%
2010	4,107	−17.3%
2020	3,226	−21.5%

== History ==
The area of Yamazoe was part of ancient Yamato Province. After the Meiji restoration, the village of Higashiyama in Soekami District, and villages of Watano and Toyohara in Yamabe District were established with the creation of the modern municipalities system on April 1, 1889. On September 30, 1956 the three villages merged to form the village of yamazoe.

== Government ==
Yamazoe has a mayor-council form of government with a directly elected mayor and a unicameral village council of ten members. Yamazoe, together with the city of Nara contributes 11 members to the Nara Prefectural Assembly. In terms of national politics, the town is part of the Nara 2nd district of the lower house of the Diet of Japan.

== Economy ==
The economy of Yamazoe is agricultural. The area is noted for its green tea production.

== Education ==
Yamazoe has one public elementary school and one public junior high school operated by the village government and one public high school operated by the Nara Prefectural Board of Education.

== Transportation ==
=== Railways ===
Yamazoe has no passenger railway service. The nearest train stations are the Iga Railway Uenoshi Station (20 minutes by car), or either Kintetsu Railway Iga-Kambe Station or JR West Iga-Ueno Station (both 25 minutes by car) 20 minutes by car from Iga Railway Uenoshi Station (Ninjashi Station)

=== Highways ===
- Meihan Expressway
- National Route 25
