= List of cities in Nara Prefecture by population =

The following list sorts all municipalities (cities, towns and villages) in the Japanese prefecture of Nara with a population of more than 5,000 according to the 2020 Census. As of October 1, 2020, 27 places fulfill this criterion and are listed here. This list refers only to the population of individual cities, towns and villages within their defined limits, which does not include other municipalities or suburban areas within urban agglomerations.

Population figures are retroactively calculated to correspond to 2006 municipalities and municipal borders (see also the List of mergers in Nara Prefecture).

== List ==
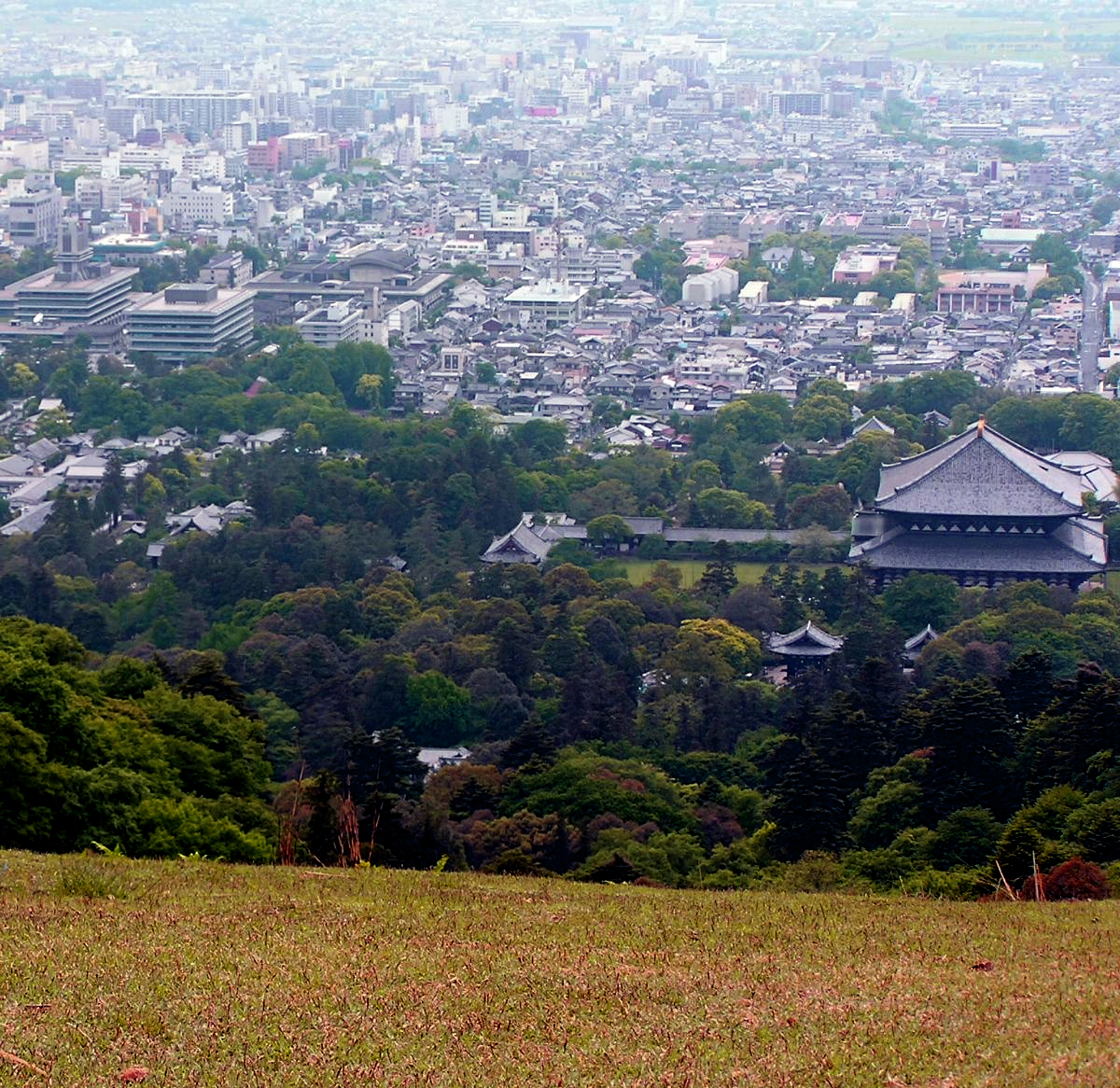
Nara

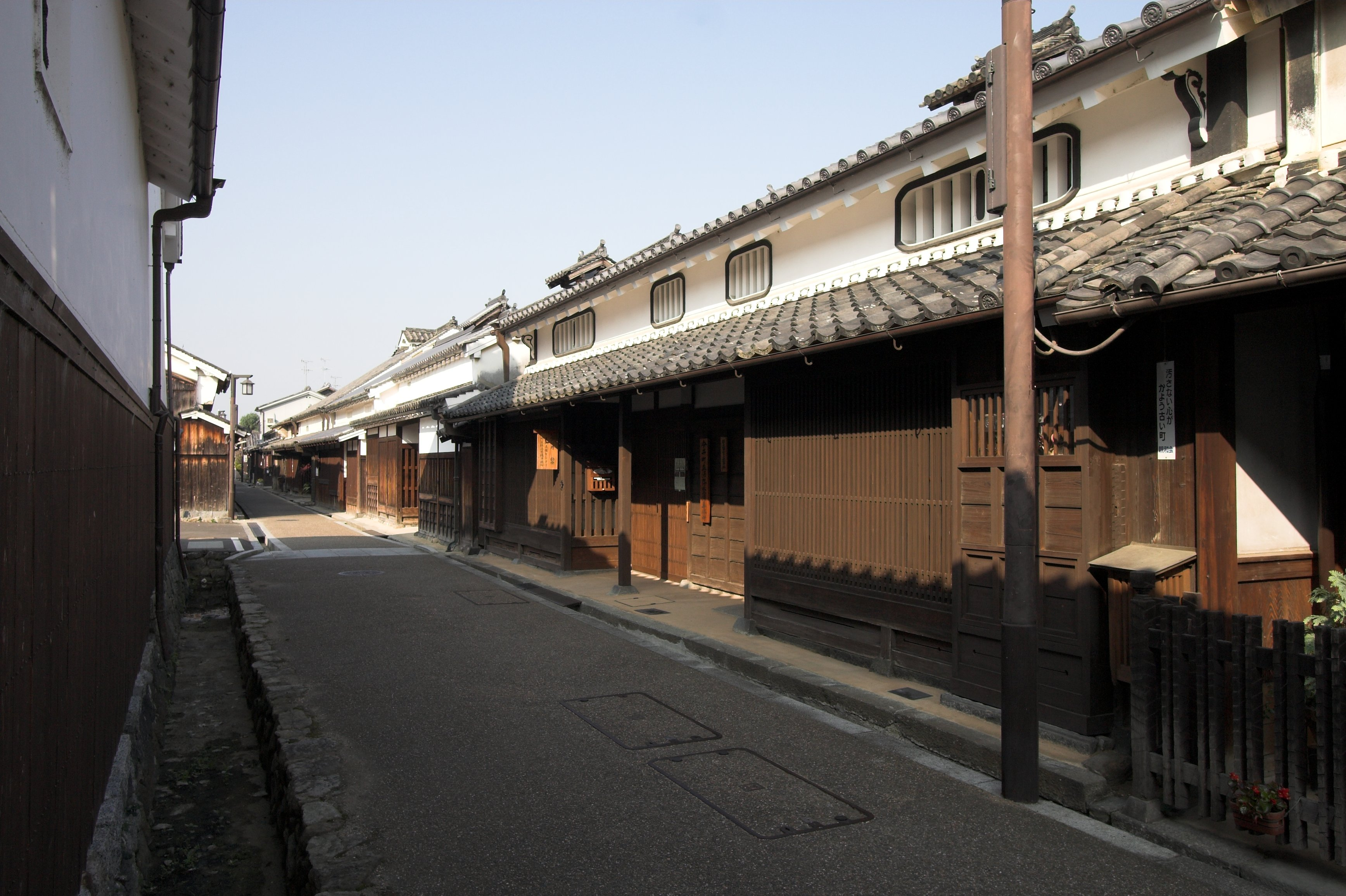
Kashihara

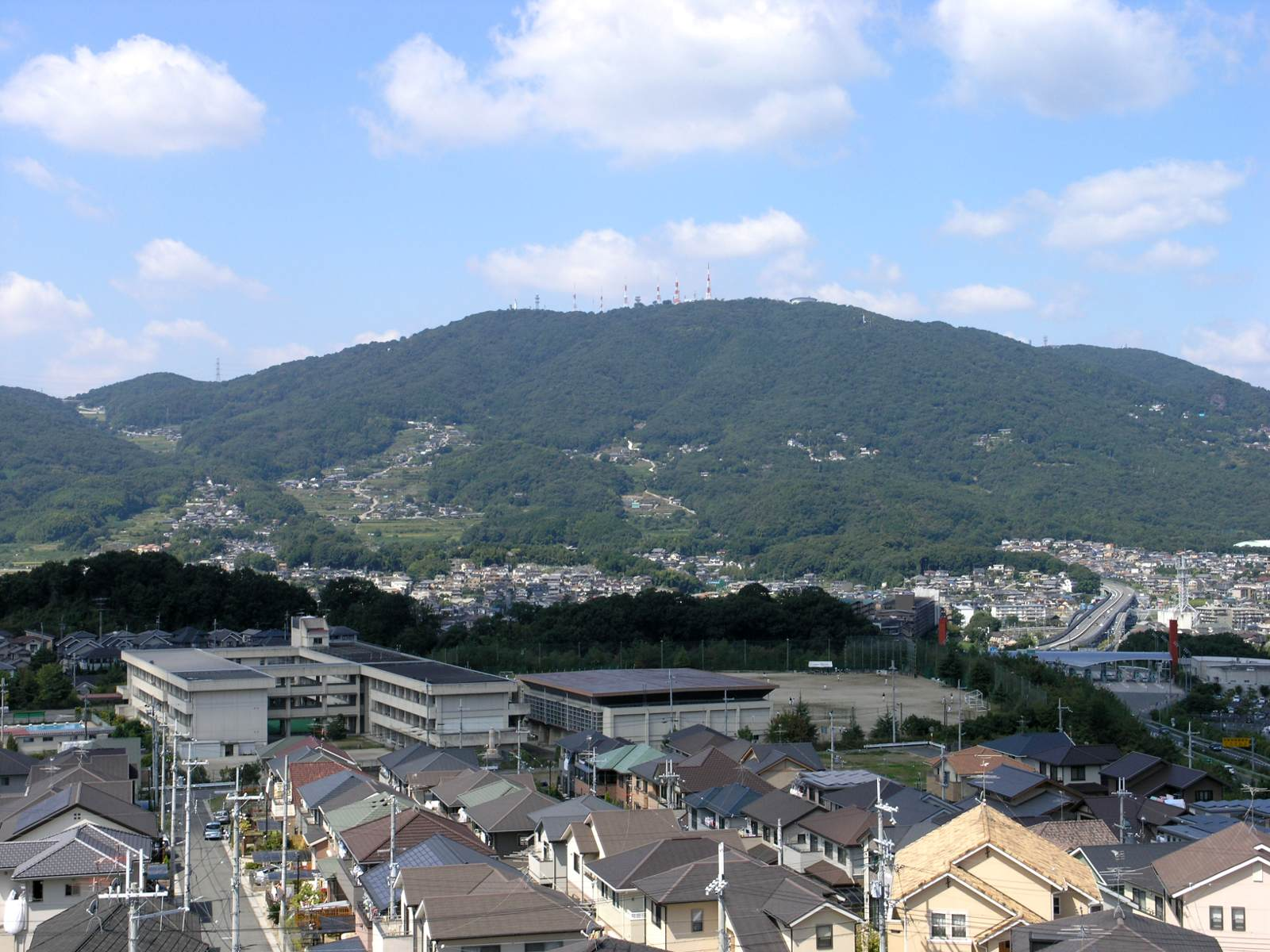
Ikoma

The following table lists the 27 cities, towns and villages in Nara with a population of at least 5,000 on October 1, 2020, according to the 2020 Census. The table also gives an overview of the evolution of the population since the 1995 census.

Rank (2020)	Name	Status	2020	2015	2010	2005	2000	1995
1	Nara	City	354,833	360,310	366,591	370,102	374,944	368,039
2	Kashihara	City	120,972	124,111	125,605	124,728	125,005	121,988
3	Ikoma	City	116,951	118,233	118,113	113,686	112,830	106,726
4	Yamatokōriyama	City	83,276	87,050	89,023	91,672	94,188	95,165
5	Kashiba	City	78,148	77,561	75,227	70,998	63,487	56,739
6	Tenri	City	63,941	67,398	69,178	71,152	72,741	74,188
7	Yamatotakada	City	61,779	64,817	68,451	70,800	73,668	73,806
8	Sakurai	City	54,870	57,244	60,146	61,130	63,248	63,225
9	Katsuragi	City	36,845	36,635	35,859	34,985	34,950	34,436
10	Kōryō	Town	33,842	33,487	33,070	32,810	31,444	29,457
11	Tawaramoto	Town	31,213	31,691	32,121	33,029	32,934	32,837
12	Uda	City	28,144	31,105	34,227	37,183	39,762	42,035
13	Gojō	City	27,947	30,997	34,460	37,375	39,928	40,871
14	Ikaruga	Town	27,611	27,303	27,734	27,816	28,566	28,371
15	Gose	City	24,113	26,868	30,287	32,273	34,676	36,119
16	Ōji	Town	24,054	23,025	22,182	22,751	23,782	24,574
17	Sangō	Town	23,233	23,571	23,440	23,062	23,977	24,161
18	Kanmaki	Town	21,715	22,054	23,728	24,953	24,005	23,811
19	Heguri	Town	18,025	18,883	19,727	20,286	20,497	20,385
20	Kawai	Town	17,032	17,941	18,531	19,446	20,126	19,903
21	Ōyodo	Town	16,728	18,069	19,176	20,070	20,376	20,015
22	Kawanishi	Town	8,165	8,485	8,653	9,174	9,422	9,847
23	Ando	Town	7,225	7,443	7,929	8,257	8,539	8,941
24	Takatori	Town	6,736	7,195	7,657	7,914	8,153	8,388
25	Miyake	Town	6,443	6,836	7,440	7,764	8,042	8,584
26	Yoshino	Town	6,232	7,399	8,642	9,984	11,318	12,427
27	Asuka	Village	5,237	5,523	5,856	6,343	6,846	7,126
28	Shimoichi	Town	5,042	5,664	7,020	7,737	8,670	9,532
