= Uda Matsuyama Castle =

Castle in Uda, Nara, Japan

- 宇陀松山城
- Uda, Nara Japan
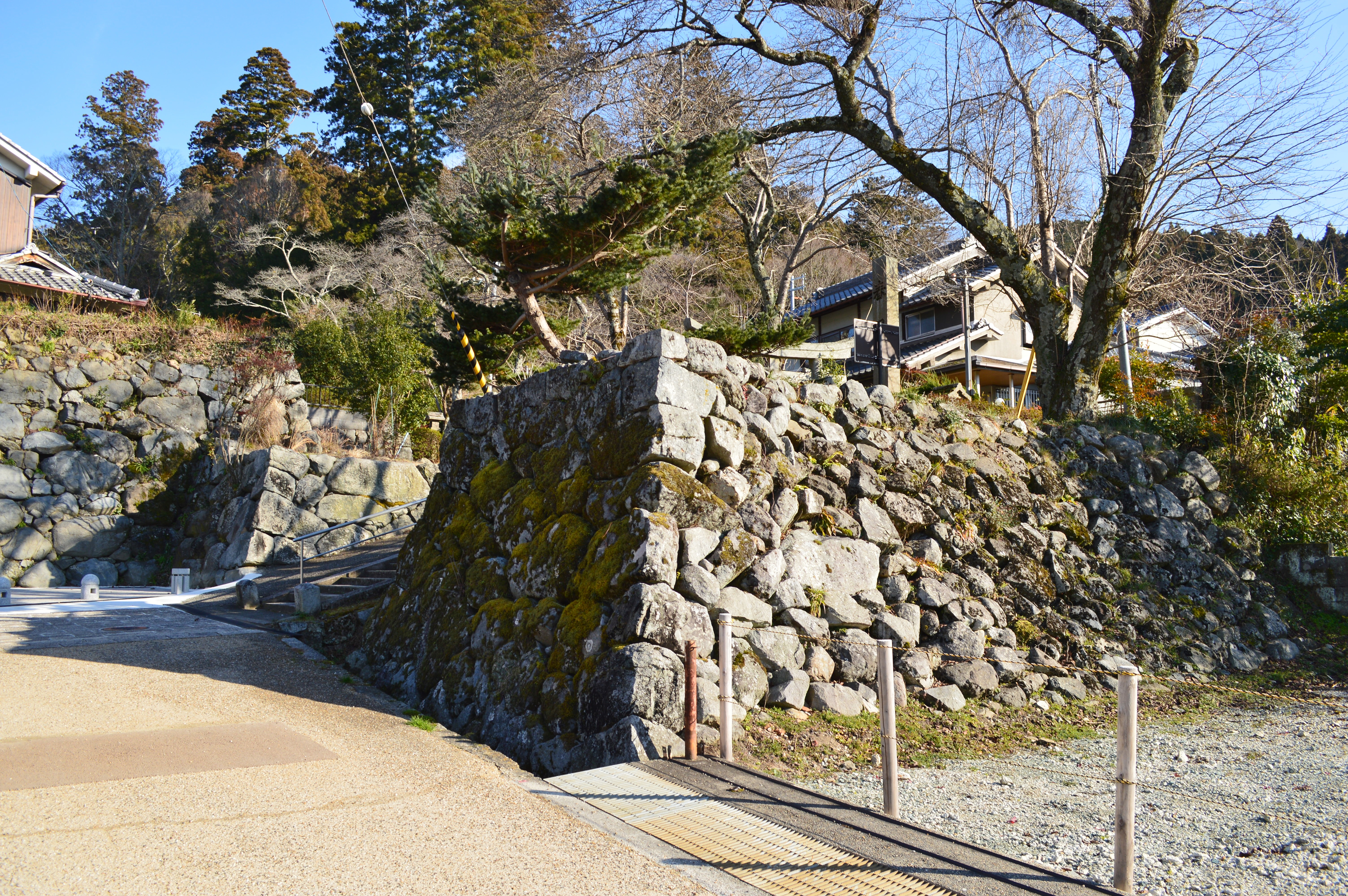
- Site of the Kasuga-mon, Uda-Matsuyama Castle

Site information
- Type: Japanese castle
- Open to the public: yes
- Condition: Archaeological and designated national historical site; castle ruins

Location
- Location within Nara Prefecture Location within Japan
- Coordinates: 34°28′58″N 135°55′52.2″E

Site history
- In use: Sengoku period
- National Historic Site of Japan

Uda Matsuyama Castle (宇陀松山城, Uda Matsuyama-jō) is a yamajiro-style Japanese castle located in the city of Uda, Nara Prefecture, Japan. Its ruins have been protected as a National Historic Site since 2006. It is No.166 on the list "Continued 100 Fine Castles of Japan". It was also called Akiyama Castle (阿紀山城/秋山城, Akiyama-jō) or Kaguraoka Castle (神楽岡の城, Kaguraoka-jō). The castle town has been designated as an Important Preservation District for Groups of Traditional Buildings.

== Overview ==
In the Nanboku-chō period, Uda District was divided between the Akiyama, Yoshino and Sawa clans. The Akiyama constructed a stronghold on Kojōyama, a 100-mete peak at the eastern edge of Uda, and the castle was called Akiyama Castle. This was a strategic location controlling the main route between Ise Province and Yamato Province, and the main north-south route within Yamato Province between Nara and Yoshino. The Akiyama were vassals of the Kitabatake clan and later (during the Sengoku period) the Tsutsui clan against Matsunaga Hisahide and Oda Nobunaga. In 1585, when Toyotomi Hidenaga entered Kōriyama Castle, the Akiyama clan left Uda and their castle was assigned to various of his generals, including Ito Yoshiyuki, Kato Mitsuyasu, Haneda Masachika, and Taga Hidetane in succession. The large-scale renovations carried out during this time show that Uda Matsuyama Castle was recognized by the Toyotomi clan as a key part of the control of Yamato Province, along with Yamato Kōriyama Castle and Takatori Castle.

After the Battle of Sekigahara in 1600, Taga Hidetane was removed from his position because he fought on the side of Ishida Mitsunari's Western Army, and Fukushima Masanori's younger brother, Fukushima Takaharu, was assigned castellan. Fukushima Takaharu carried out even larger-scale renovations in addition to those made by the various petty warlords under the Toyotomi government. Archaeological excavations have unearthed the foundations of stone buildings, including the Honmaru Palace, large stone walls, roof tiles, ceramics, and other items. Fukushima Takaharu renamed the castle Matsuyama Castle after the renovations. However, he was deprived of his domain and castle by the Tokugawa shogunate in 1615 for colluding with Toyotomi Hideyori during the Battle of Osaka. The castle was destroyed under the supervision of Kobori Enshū, who left a detailed record of its destruction. Oda Nobukatsu was assigned Uda-Matsuyama Domain, but was not allowed to rebuild the ruined castle. In 1694, the Oda clan was transferred to Kaibara Domain and the area became tenryō territory under direct control of the Tokugawa shogunate. Although the castle was long gone, its castle town survived as a merchant town and regional administrative center.

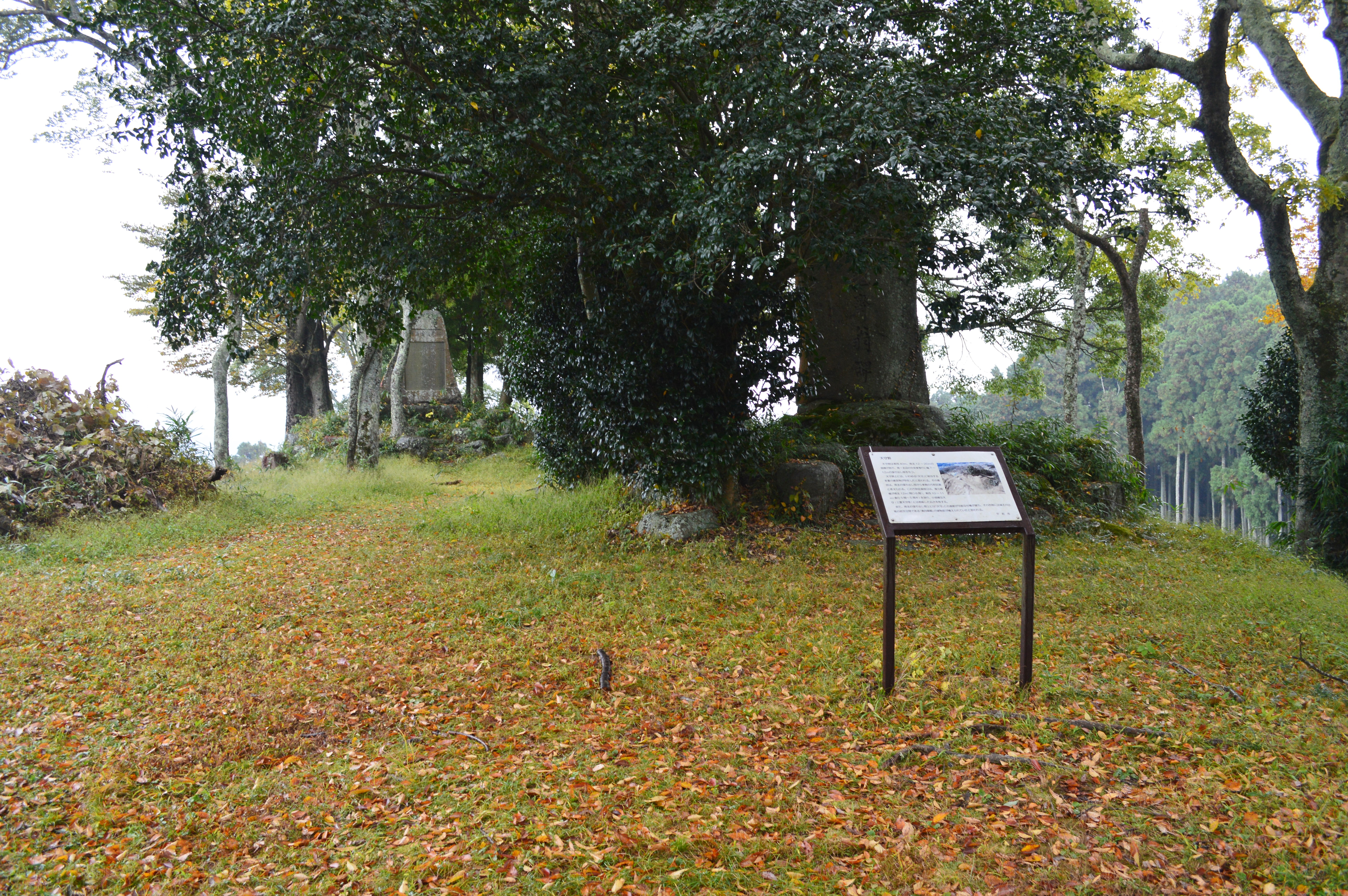
Site of the tenshu

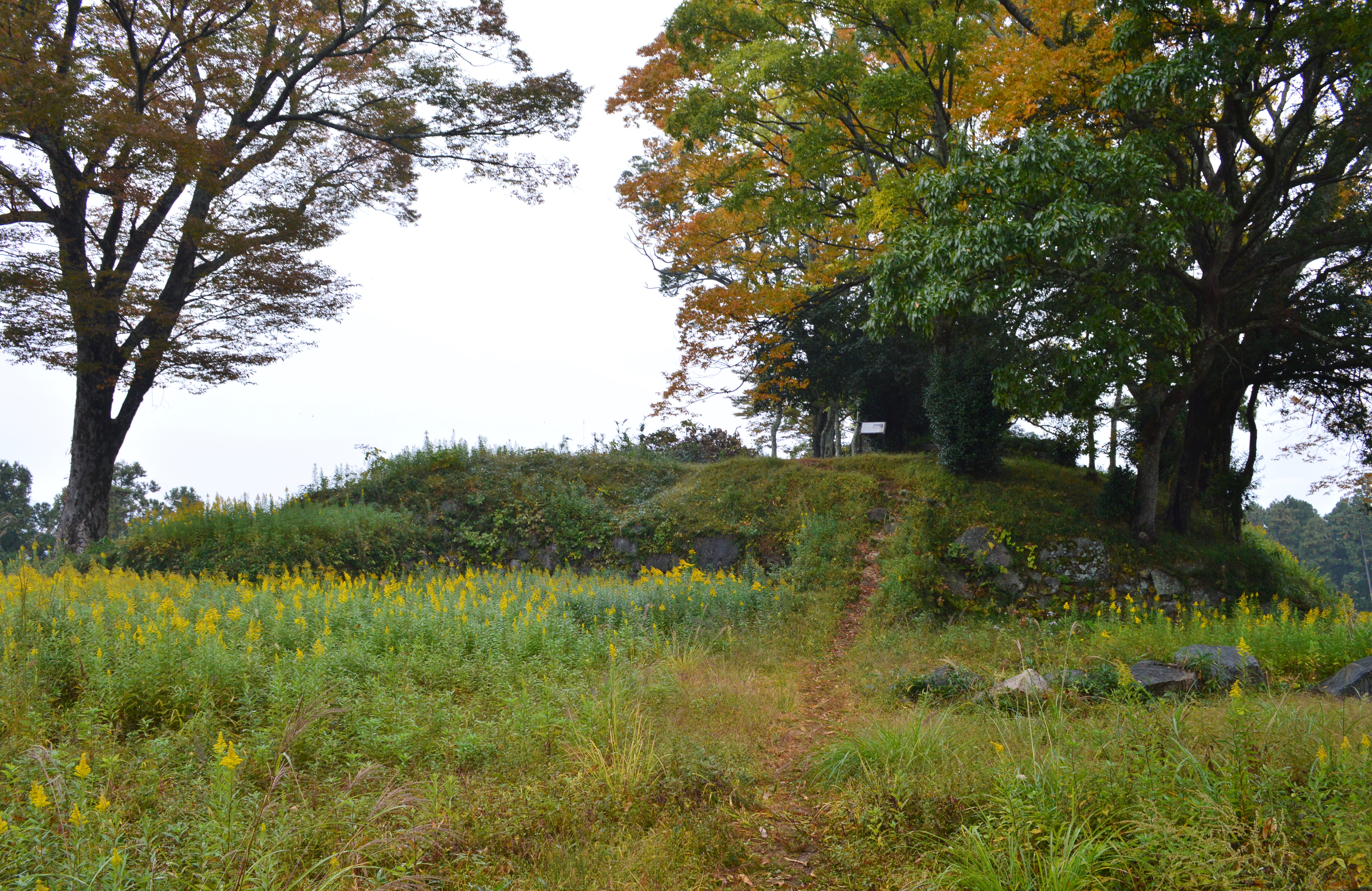
Site of the tenshu

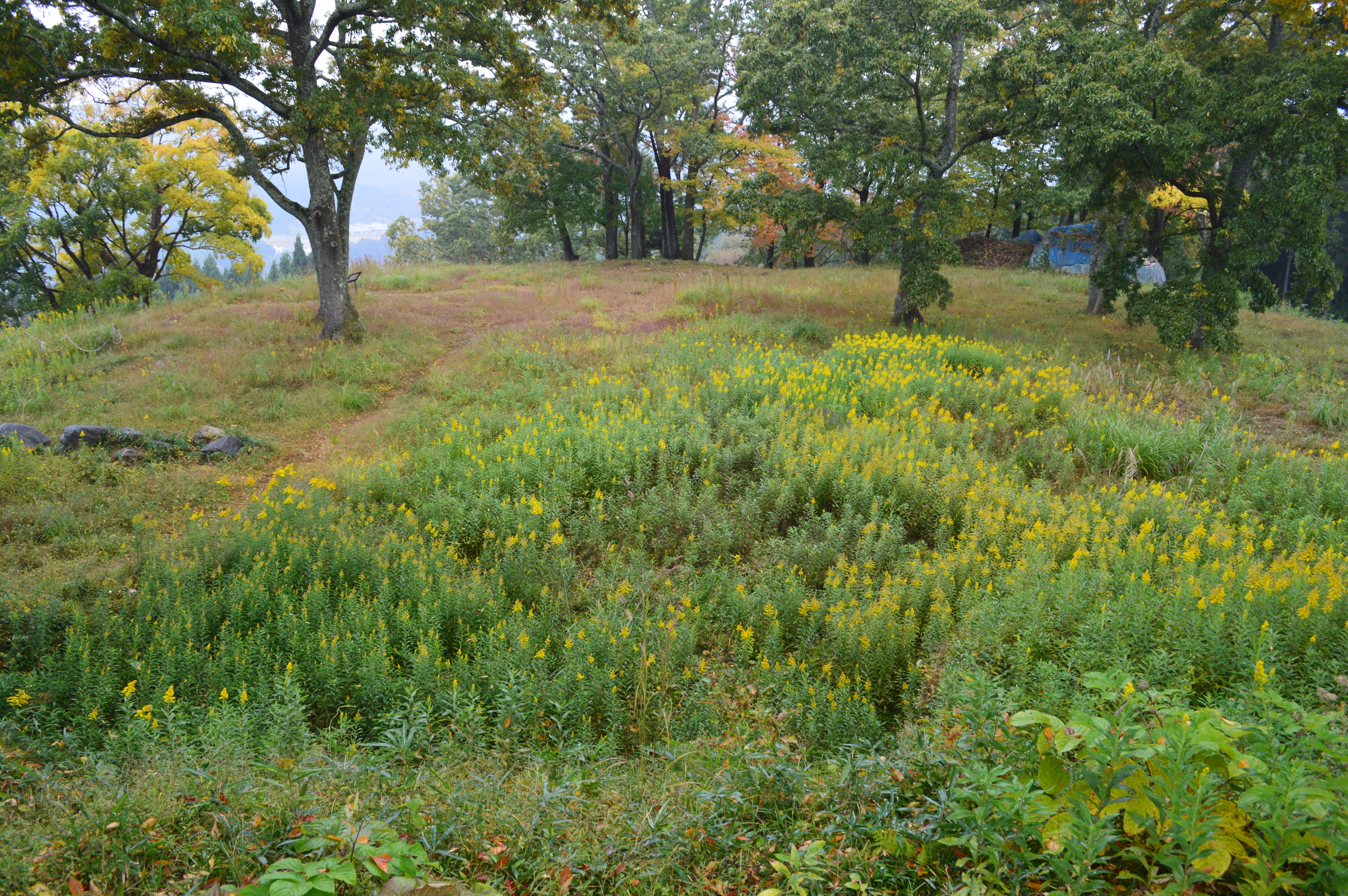
Main Enclosure

The castle ruins are approximately 7.2 kilometers south of Haibara Station on the Kintetsu Railway Osaka Line.

== Matsuyama Nishiguchi Barrier Gate ==
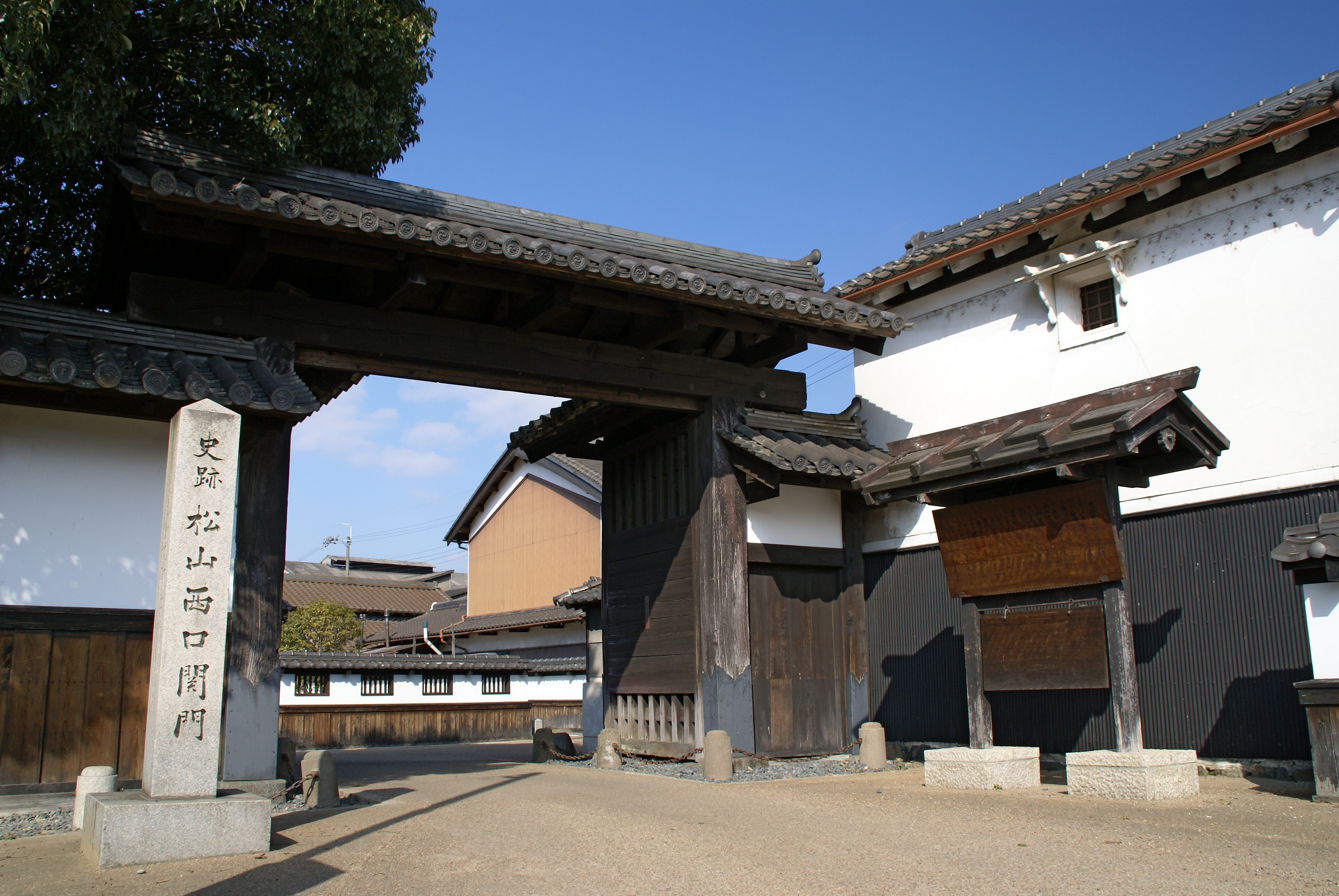
Matsuyama Nishiguchi Barrier Gate

The Matsuyama Nishiguchi Barrier Gate (松山西口関門, Matsuyama Nishiguchi Kanmon) is the surviving west gate to the jōkamachi (castle town) of Matsuyama Castle. It is located in the Ōuda neighborhood of Uda, which flourished as the jin'ya town of Uda-Matsuyama Domain, and has been designated as a National Important Traditional Buildings Preservation District. The gate has square main pillars on both sides, a span of 4.1 meters, a crown beam on top, and a gabled roof with brackets and girders. The eaves are 3.7 meters high, and the gate is all painted black and tiled. The door can be opened from both sides using stone bearings, and has a lattice door with iron fittings. For defensive purposes, the road near the gate is bent at a right angle at the entrance to the bridge, and the road also bends at a right angle after entering the gate. It was built in the early Edo period, and as it is rare for a castle town gate to remain in its original position, it was designated a National Historic Site in 1931.

== See also ==
- List of Historic Sites of Japan (Nara)

== Literature ==
- Benesch, Oleg and Ran Zwigenberg (2019). Japan's Castles: Citadels of Modernity in War and Peace. Cambridge: Cambridge University Press. p. 374. ISBN 9781108481946.
- De Lange, William (2021). An Encyclopedia of Japanese Castles. Groningen: Toyo Press. pp. 600 pages. ISBN 978-9492722300.
