= Yamato Province =

Former province of Japan

Yamato Province 大和国
- Province of Japan
- 7th century–1871
- Map of Japanese provinces (1868) with Yamato Province highlighted
- Capital: Takaichi District
- History
  - Established: 7th century
  - Disestablished: 1871
- Today part of: Nara Prefecture

Yamato Province (大和国, Yamato no Kuni; Japanese pronunciation: [jä́.mä̀.tò̞ (nò̞ kɯ̈̀.ɲ̟ì)]) was a province of Japan, located in Kinai, corresponding to present-day Nara Prefecture in Honshū. It was also called Washū (和州). Yamato consists of two characters, 大 "great", and 和 "Wa". At first, the name was written with one different character (大倭), but due to its offensive connotation, for about ten years after 737, this was revised to use more desirable characters (大養徳) (see Names of Japan). The final revision was made in the second year of the Tenpyō-hōji era (c. 758). It is classified as a great province in the Engishiki.

The Yamato Period in the history of Japan refers to the late Kofun Period (c. 250–538) and Asuka Period (538–710). Japanese archaeologists and historians emphasize the fact that during the early Kofun Period the Yamato Kingship was in close contention with other regional powers, such as Kibi Province near present-day Okayama Prefecture. Around the 6th century, the local chieftainship gained national control and established the Imperial court in Yamato Province.

The battleship Yamato, the flagship of the Japanese Combined Fleet during World War II, was named after this province.

== Capital ==
During the Kofun period (300 to 538) and the Asuka period, many palace capitals were located in Kashihara, Asuka, and Sakurai. Yamato was the first central government of the unified country in the Kofun period. Heijō-kyō capital was placed in Nara City during the Nara period.

In the 14th century, the capital of the Southern Court was established in Yoshino and Anou.

== Temples ==
The provincial temple for monks is popularly thought to have been Tōdai-ji, but it may have in fact been a different one in Kashihara. The one for nuns was Hokke-ji.

The primary shinto shrine was Sakurai's Ōmiwa Shrine, but there have been no records stating as such found at the shrine itself. There were no secondary shrines. The sōja (or principal Shinto shrine in the province) was Kokufu Shrine (Takatori, Takaichi, Nara).

== Kami of Yamato ==
- Minamoto no Shigetoki
- Minamoto no Suetō
- Utsunomiya Nobufusa
- Oda Hidanaga
- Oda Toshisada
- Oda Tatsusada
- Oda Tatsukatsu
- Mitsuki Naoyori
- Honjō Fusanaga
- Tōyama Kagetō
- Jushii-ge Nakai Masakiyo
- Jushii-ge Matsudaira Tomonori
- Jushii-ge Matsudaira Naotsune
- Jugoi-ge Kanō Hisachika
- Jushii-ge Matsudaira Naonobu
- Jushii-ge Matsudaira Tsunenori
- Jushii-ge Matsudaira Naoyoshi

== Districts ==
Ancient		Medieval	1 April 1896	Modern
Sofu (曾布)	Sofu no Kami no Kōri	Soekami-gun	Soekami-gun	Nara-shi, Tenri-shi
Sofu (曾布)	Sofu no Shimo no Kōri	Soejimo-gun	Ikoma-gun	Yamatokōriyama-shi, Ikoma-shi, Ikoma-gun
	Heguri no Kōri	Heguri-gun	Ikoma-gun	Yamatokōriyama-shi, Ikoma-shi, Ikoma-gun
	Hirose no Kōri	Hirose-gun	Kitakatsuragi-gun	Yamatotakada-shi, Kashiba-shi, Katsuragi-shi, Kitakatsuragi-gun
Katsuragi (葛城)	Katsuragi no Shimo no Kōri	Katsuge-gun	Kitakatsuragi-gun	Yamatotakada-shi, Kashiba-shi, Katsuragi-shi, Kitakatsuragi-gun
Katsuragi (葛城)	Katsuragi no Kami no Kōri	Katsujō-gun	Minamikatsuragi-gun	Gose-shi
Katsuragi (葛城)	Oshimi no Kōri	Oshimi-gun	Minamikatsuragi-gun	Gose-shi
	Uchi no Kōri	Uchi-gun	Uchi-gun	Gojō-shi
	Yoshino no Kōri	Yoshino-gun	Yoshino-gun	Gojō-shi, Yoshino-gun
	Uda no Kōri	Uda-gun	Uda-gun	Uda-shi, Uda-gun
Shiki (磯城)	Shiki no Kami no Kōri	Shikijō-gun	Shiki-gun	Tenri-shi, Kashihara-shi, Sakurai-shi, Shiki-gun
Shiki (磯城)	Shiki no Shimo no Kōri	Shikige-gun	Shiki-gun	Tenri-shi, Kashihara-shi, Sakurai-shi, Shiki-gun
	Toichi no Kōri	Toichi-gun	Shiki-gun	Tenri-shi, Kashihara-shi, Sakurai-shi, Shiki-gun
	Takaichi no Kōri	Takaichi-gun	Takaichi-gun	Kashihara-shi, Takaichi-gun
	Yamabe no Kōri	Yamabe-gun	Yamabe-gun	Tenri-shi, Nara-shi, Yamabe-gun

== Domains ==
- Yagyū Domain
- Kōriyama Domain
- Koizumi Domain
- Yanagimoto Domain
- Kaijū Domain / Shibamura Domain
- Kujira Domain
- Uda-Matsuyama Domain
- Takatori Domain
- Okidome Domain
- Tatsuta Domain
- Tawaramoto Domain
- Kishida Domain
- Yamato-Shinjō Domain
- Gose Domain
- Yamato-Gojō Domain

== See also ==
- Japanese battleship Yamato
- List of Han
- List of Provinces of Japan
- Thirteen Buddhist Sites of Yamato
- Yamataikoku
- Yamato-damashii - 'the Japanese spirit'
- Yamato period
- Yamato people (Japanese)
- Yoshino Province
