= Ōno-ji =

Buddhist temple in Nara Prefecture, Japan

- 大野寺
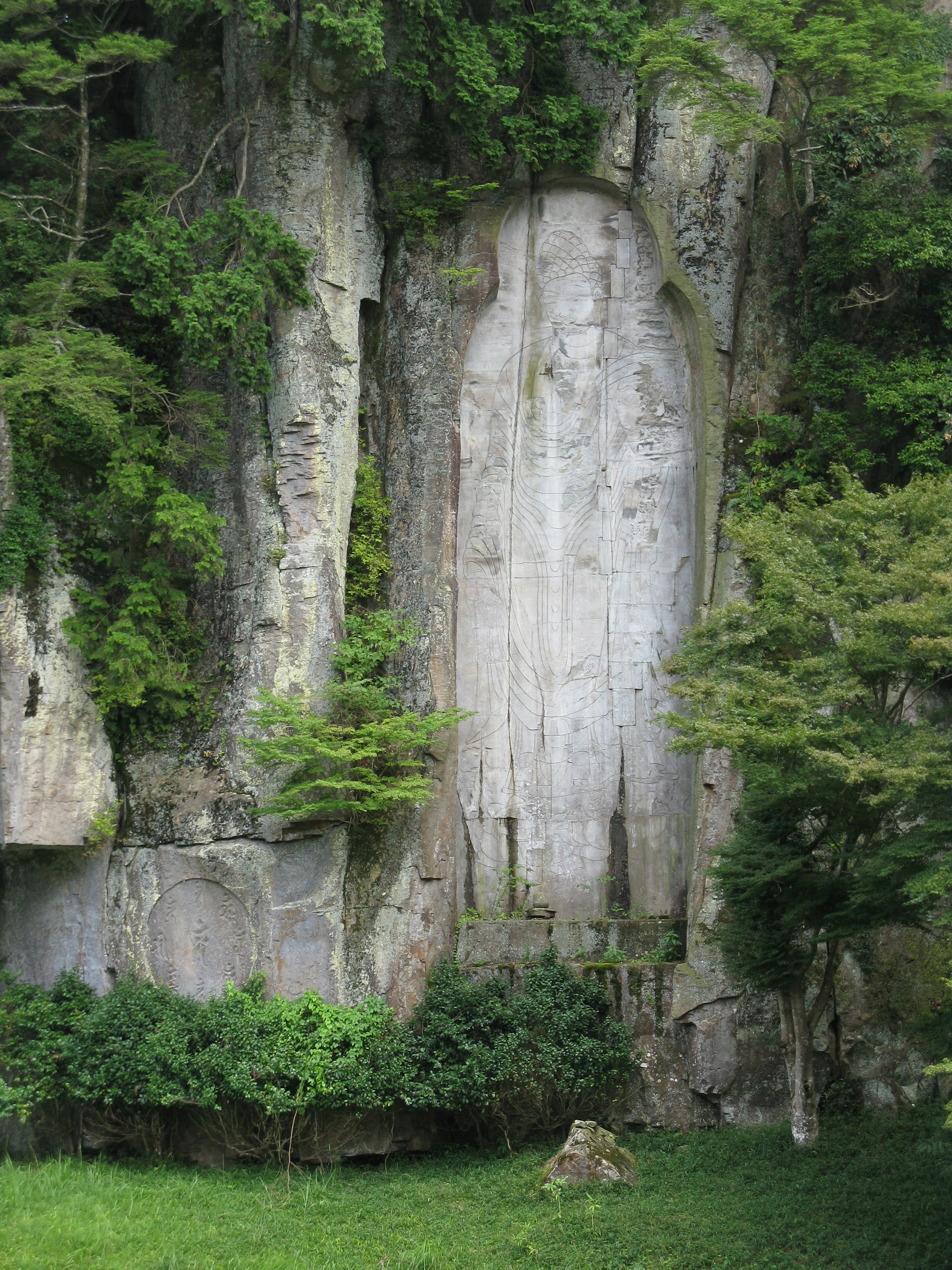
- Ōno-ji magaibutsu

- Ōno-dera Ōno-ji (Japan)

Religion
- Affiliation: Buddhist
- Rite: Shingon

Location
- Location: Uda, Nara
- Country: Japan
- Coordinates: 34°33′45.3″N 136°0′56.3″E

Architecture
- Founder: c.En no Gyōja
- Completed: c.681

Ōno-ji (大野寺), also known as Ōno-dera, is a Buddhist temple located in the Murō-Ōno neighborhood of the city of Uda, Nara. It belongs to the Murōji-branch of Shingon Buddhism and its honzon is a statue of Miroku Bosatsu. The temple is located at the western entry to Muro-ji and is known for its rock-carved image of Miroku Bosatsu carved into a natural face on the bank of the Uda River, which was designated a National Historic Site in 1934.

== Overview ==
The origins of the temple are uncertain. According to the temple's legend, it was first established by the semi-legendary founder of Shugendō, En no Gyōja, in 681. In 824, Kūkai reconstructed the temple, and renamed it Jison-in Miroku-ji. The nearby temple of Murō-ji was originally a Hosso sect temple founded and developed by monks from Kofuku-ji, and since monks from Kofuku-ji were also involved in the carving of its rock-carved Buddhist statues, it believed is that Ōno-ji was closely related to Kofuku-ji.

The temple was completely destroyed by fire in 1900 in which all of its ancient records were destroyed. At that time, the honzon image and other Buddha statues were saved from the fire, but the current buildings were all modern reconstructions. The temple is located a five-minute walk from Murōguchi-Ōno Station on the Kintetsu Railway Osaka Line.

=== Ōno-ji Stone Buddha ===
The term magaibutsu (磨崖仏) refers to a Buddhist figure carved directly into a natural rock faces or cliffside. The Miroku Bosatsu image at Ōno-ji is a magaibutsu carved into a large rock wall about 30 meters high on the opposite bank of the Uda River. The rock wall was carved into a halo shape over a height of 13.8 meters, and the inside was smoothed and carved into a 11.5-meter-tall (38 ft) bas-relief image. Work began in 1207 at the request of the monk Gaen of Kofuku-ji, and the eye-opening ceremony was held in 1209 in the presence of cloistered Emperor Go-Toba. The creator is thought to be a stonemason who came to Japan from Song China. It is modeled after a large stone statue of Miroku Bosatsu (of which only the halo remains today) that was located on Mount Kasagi in Yamashiro Province. The statue was surveyed in 1916 by archaeologists, who discovered that the image had a hole in its chest, sealed by a stone lid eight-cm in diameter and three-cm thick. A small scroll was found inside, but the characters were illegible. There was also a hole in the abdomen around the navel, and a scroll was found inside, but it was so badly decomposed that it was illegible. To the lower left of the main image is a 2.2-meter-diameter (7.2 ft) circle carved into an outline of a mandala, with Vairocana in the center and Siddhaṃ script characters representing various Buddhas carved into the periphery, which is thought to date to the same period as the main image.

The statue was endangered by groundwater seeping out of the bedrock, so conservation and repair work was carried out from 1993 to 1999. Work included removing moss from the surface and changing the flow path of the groundwater.

== National Important Cultural Properties ==
- Jizo Bosatsu (地蔵菩薩立像) standing statue, early Kamakura-period, yosegi-zukuri, 98.8-cm tall. Important Cultural Property.
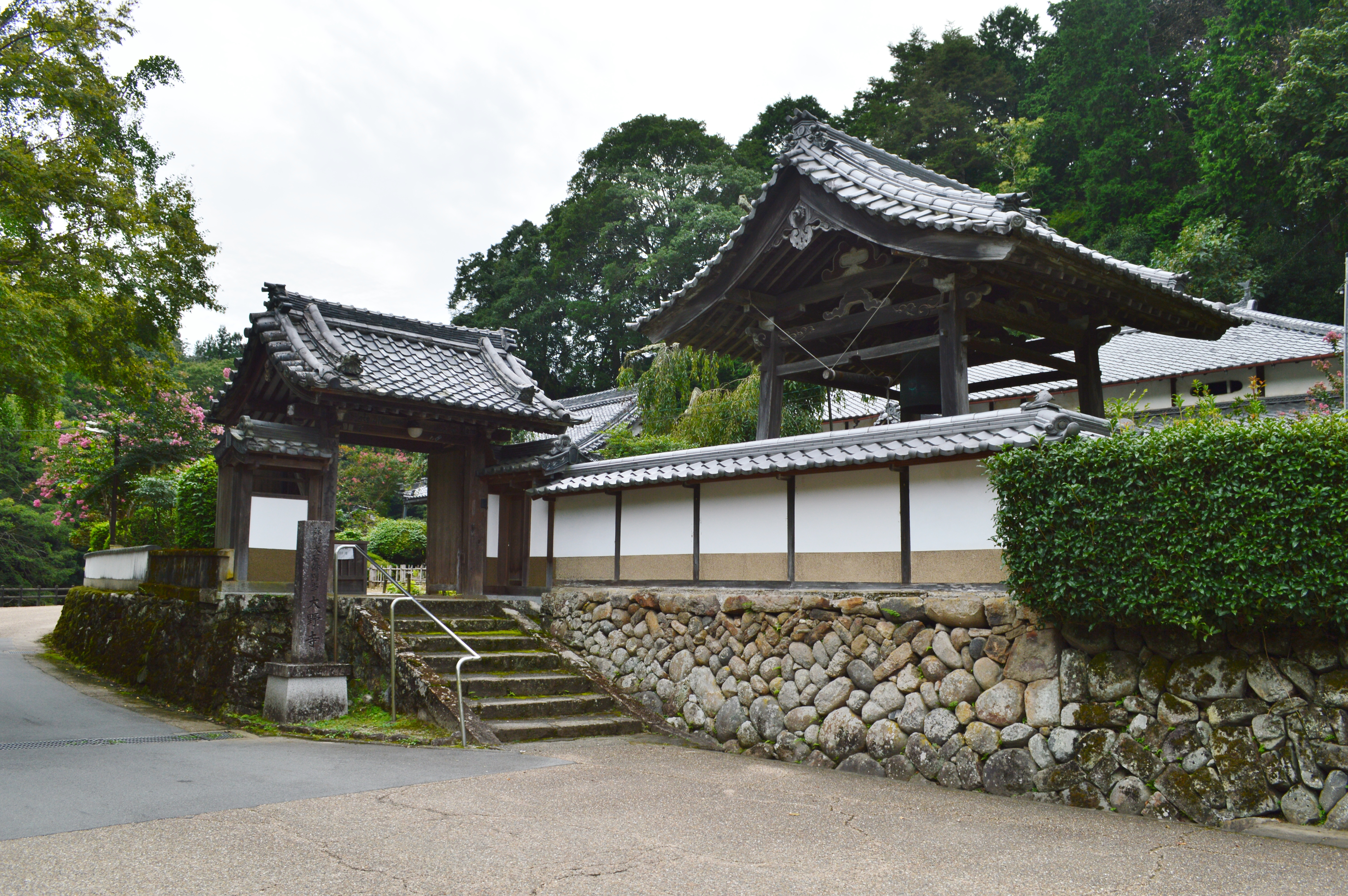
Gate of the temple

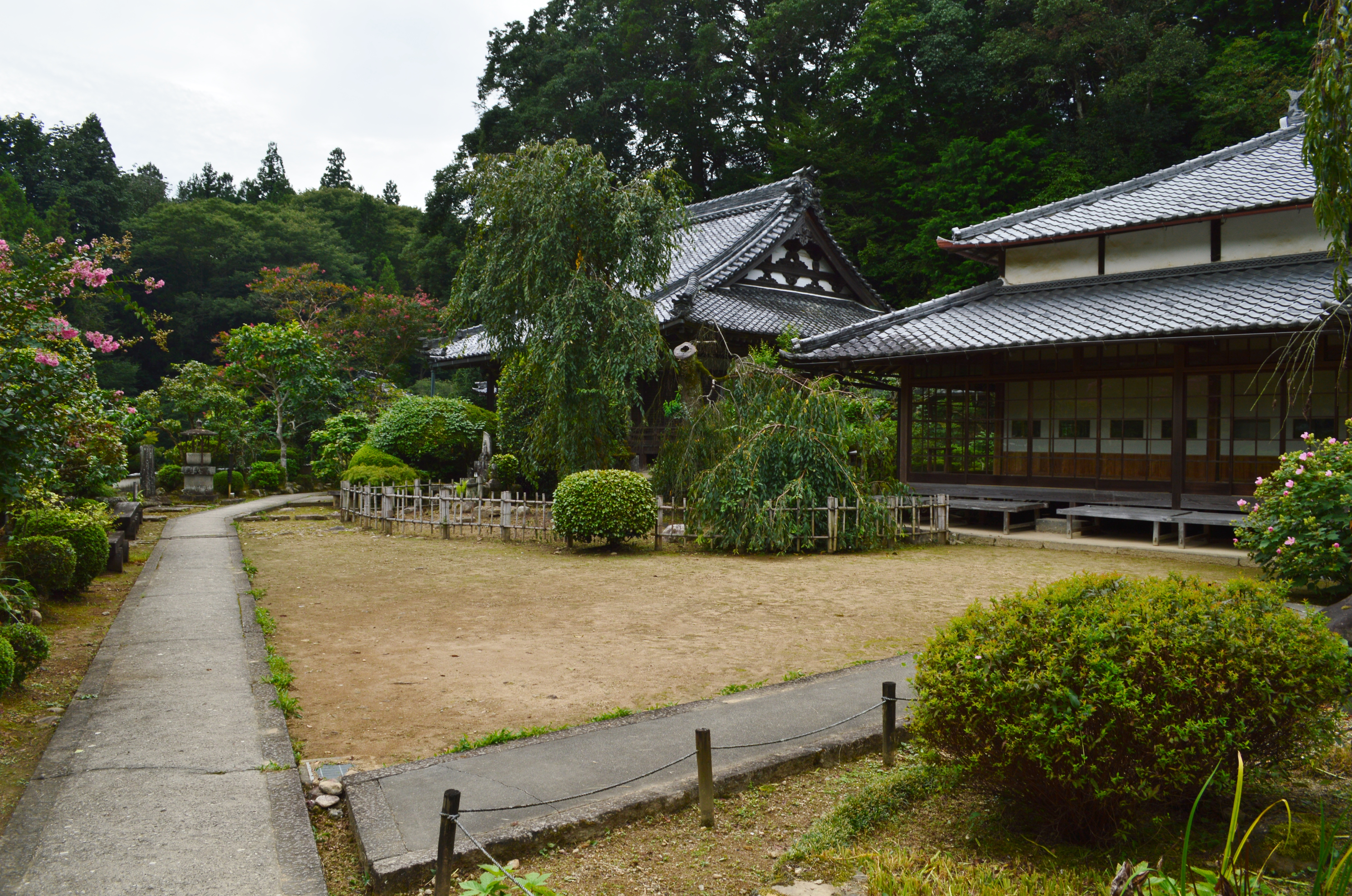
Precincts

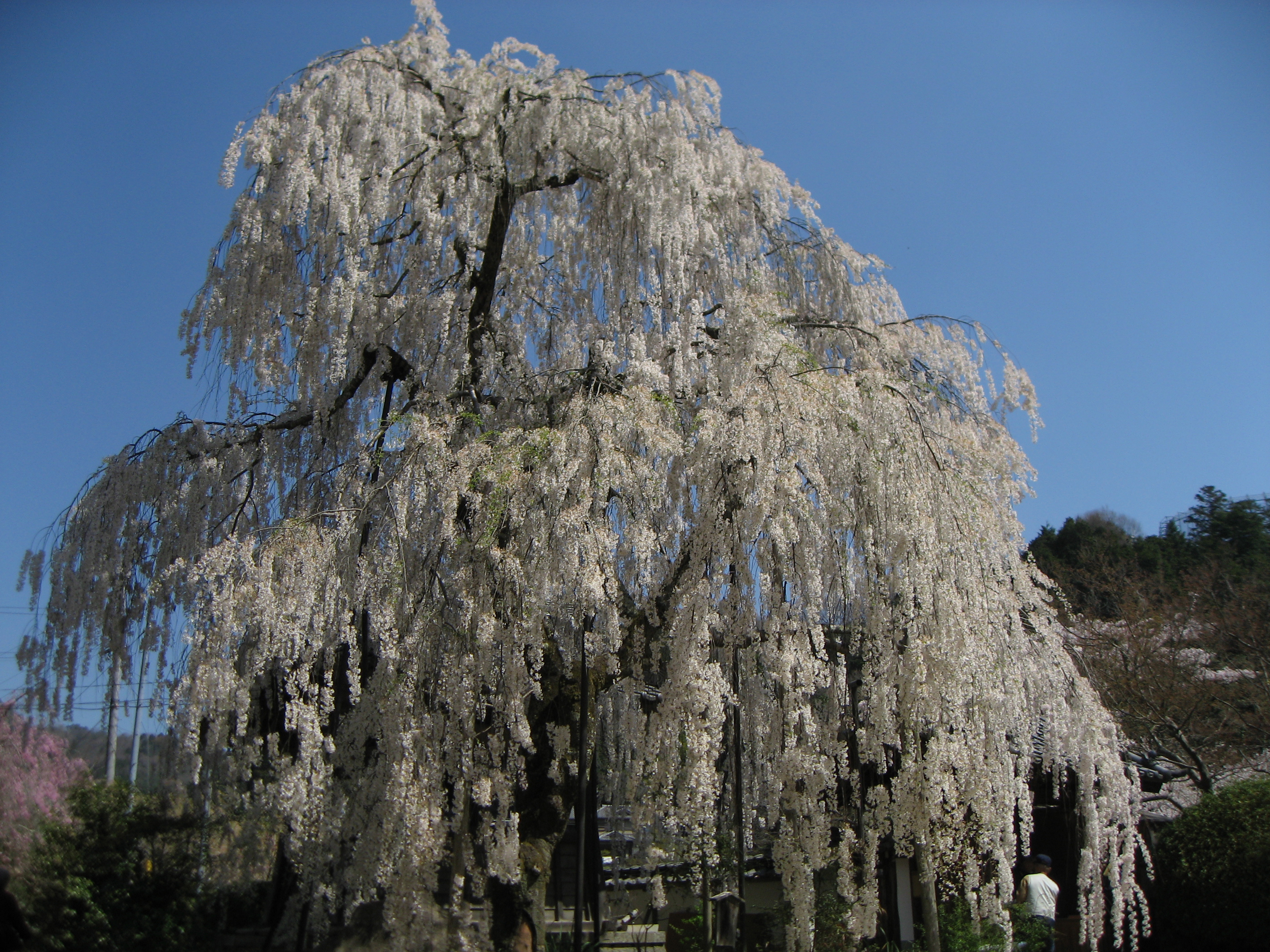
Weeping sakura

== See also ==
- List of Historic Sites of Japan (Nara)

== Bibliography ==
- Itō, Matsuo (2003). En no Gyōja (修験道の開祖 役行者 その足跡に迫る) (in Japanese). Bungeisha. pp. 87–88. ISBN 4-8355-6114-7.
- Bhattacharyya, Asoke Kumar (2004). Early and Buddhist stone sculpture of Japan. Abhinav Publications. p. 34. ISBN 81-7017-422-8.
