= Tsukigase, Nara =

Dissolved municipality in Nara prefecture, Japan

Tsukigase (月ヶ瀬村, Tsukigase-mura) was a village located in Soekami District, Nara Prefecture, Japan.

As of 2003, the village had an estimated population of 1,913 and a density of 89.60 persons per km^{2}. The total area was 21.35 km^{2}.

On April 1, 2005, Tsukigase, along with the village of Tsuge (from Yamabe District), was merged into the expanded city of Nara.
