= Zennyo Ryūō =

Rain-god dragon in Japanese mythology

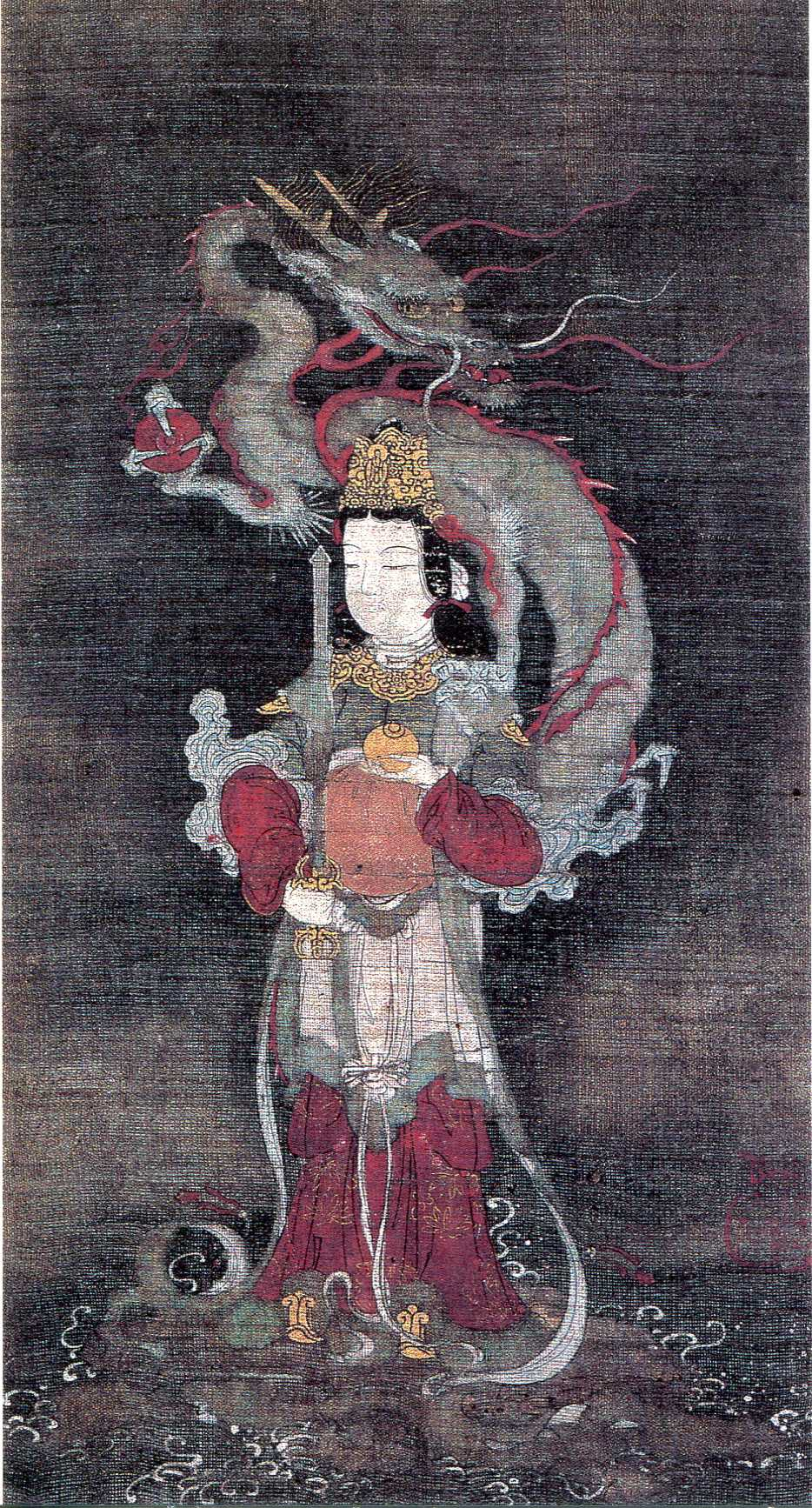
Zennyo Ryūō by Hasegawa Tōhaku (Ishikawa Nanao Art Museum)

Zennyo Ryūō (善如龍王 or 善女龍王; lit. "goodness-like dragon-king" or "goodness woman dragon-king", respectively) is a rain-god dragon in Japanese mythology. According to Japanese Buddhist tradition, the priest Kūkai made Zennyo Ryūō appear in 824 AD during a famous rainmaking contest at the Kyoto Imperial Palace.

== Ryūō ==
The dragon name Zennyo Ryūō is written in Japanese as 善 zen "good, goodness; virtuous", 女 nyo "woman; female" or 如 nyo "like; as if; be like; thus" (differentiated with the "mouth radical" 口), and 龍王 ryūō or 竜王 "dragon king".

Zennyo is a common theme in Japanese art, usually depicted as a small dragon but sometimes as a human, either male or female, with a dragon's tail. The "female" representations could explain this variant character 女 (Visser 1913:162). Fowler (1997:155) cites Nishida Nagao 西田長男 that this 女 "woman" in Zennyo was an error for the original character 如. In Japanese Buddhist terminology, nyo 如 "like; thus" is used to translate Sanskrit words like nyorai 如来 "thus come" for tathāgata. Compare shinzennyo 近善女 "near goodness female" translating upāsikā "female disciple; female devotee".

Zennyo 善如 was also the name of a Jōdo Shinshū priest (1333–1389) who was a grandson of Kakunyo and the fourth chief priest of the Hongan-ji.

Some legends give the name of Zennyo as Zentatsu 善達 "goodness penetration" with tatsu 達 "penetrate; arrive at; reach; realize" instead of nyo.

== Mount Murō ==
Zennyo or Zentatsu 善達 supposedly lived in the Ryūketsu 龍穴 "Dragon Hole/Cave" on Murōyama 室生山 "Mount Murō" in Nara Prefecture, which was an ancient locale of Japanese dragon worship and rainmaking ceremonies.

The oldest historical record is the 937 CE Ben’ichizan nenbun dosha sōjō 宀一山年分度者奏上 "Mount Murō Annual Report of Ordained Monks". It states that in 778 CE five Buddhist monks went to the mountain and ceremonially prayed for the health of future Emperor Kanmu (r. 781–806), who later established the Murō-ji Temple in appreciation. This text also states that in 781 CE, (Fowler 1997:147), "a Dragon King (龍王) who had been residing at this site vowed to protect the country and particularly the temple complex. For this gesture the dragon king was honored with a courtly rank, as was commonly offered to deities."

The c. 1212–1215 CE Kojidan "Talks about Ancient Matters" specifies this dragon's name and history.

The dragon cave on Mt. Murō is the dwelling place of the Dragon King Zentatsu 善達. This Dragon King previously lived in Sarusawa 猿沢 pond. Long ago when a palace lady (uneme 采女) drowned in the pond, the Dragon King fled to Mt. Kōzen 高山 (Mt. Kasuga), where he lived until the corpse of a low-ranking person was thrown into this pond. Then the Dragon King again fled to reside in a cave on Mt. Murō, where the Buddhist prelate Kengyō was practicing religious austerities. Kengyō was the master of the prelate Shūen 修円. Years later the priest Nittai 日對 wished to view the venerable form of the Dragon King. He entered the dragon cave and went about three or four chō 町 in darkness. Then he arrived at a palace under a blue sky. To the south he saw a bright light through a jeweled window screen. When the screen fluttered in the wind, he saw a section of the Lotus Sutra resting upon a jeweled table. Then he heard a voice asking him who he was and where he came from. Nittai answered that he wished to see the form of the Dragon King and announced his name. The Dragon King answered, “You will not be able to see me in this place. Leave this cave and go about three chō from the entrance.” Nittai left the cave and at the agreed-upon place he saw the Dragon King, dressed in a robe and crown, rise out of the ground and then vanish. Nittai built a shrine (社) to the Dragon King on that spot which still exists. When rain prayers are offered and sutras are read at this shrine, a black cloud forms over the cave and, spreads through the sky, and rain falls. (tr. Fowler 1997:149, cf. Visser 1913:168-9)

Noting the incongruence of a Buddhist priest establishing a Shinto shrine, Visser (1913:169) suggests that Buddhist authors embellished an ancient Shinto tradition of dragon worship at Mt. Murō and created this legend about a nāga dragon king and the Lotus Sutra.

Kokan Shiren's c. 1322 CE Genkō Shakusho "the Genkō era History of Buddhism" has a story about the priest Keien 慶圓 (1143–1223 CE) encountering a beautiful woman who was actually a shapeshifting Zennyo.

The Buddhist priest Keien lived for a thousand days as a hermit near the Dragon-hole on Mount Murōbu. On his way from there to another place he crossed a bridge over a river, when suddenly a lady, noble looking and beautifully dressed, came and, without showing her face, politely asked him for the mudrā (mystic finger-charm) used to become at once a Buddha. At his question as to who she was, she answered: "I am the Dragon Zennyo". Then he taught her the mudrā, whereupon she said: "This is exactly the same mudrā as that of the seven former Buddhas"; and when the priest requested her to show him her face, she replied: "My shape is so terrible that no man can look upon it. Yet I cannot refuse your wish". Thereupon she rose into the air and stretched out the little finger of her right hand. It proved to be a claw, more than ten shaku long, which spread a five-coloured light. Then she vanished at once. (Visser 1913:170)

== Shinsen'en ==
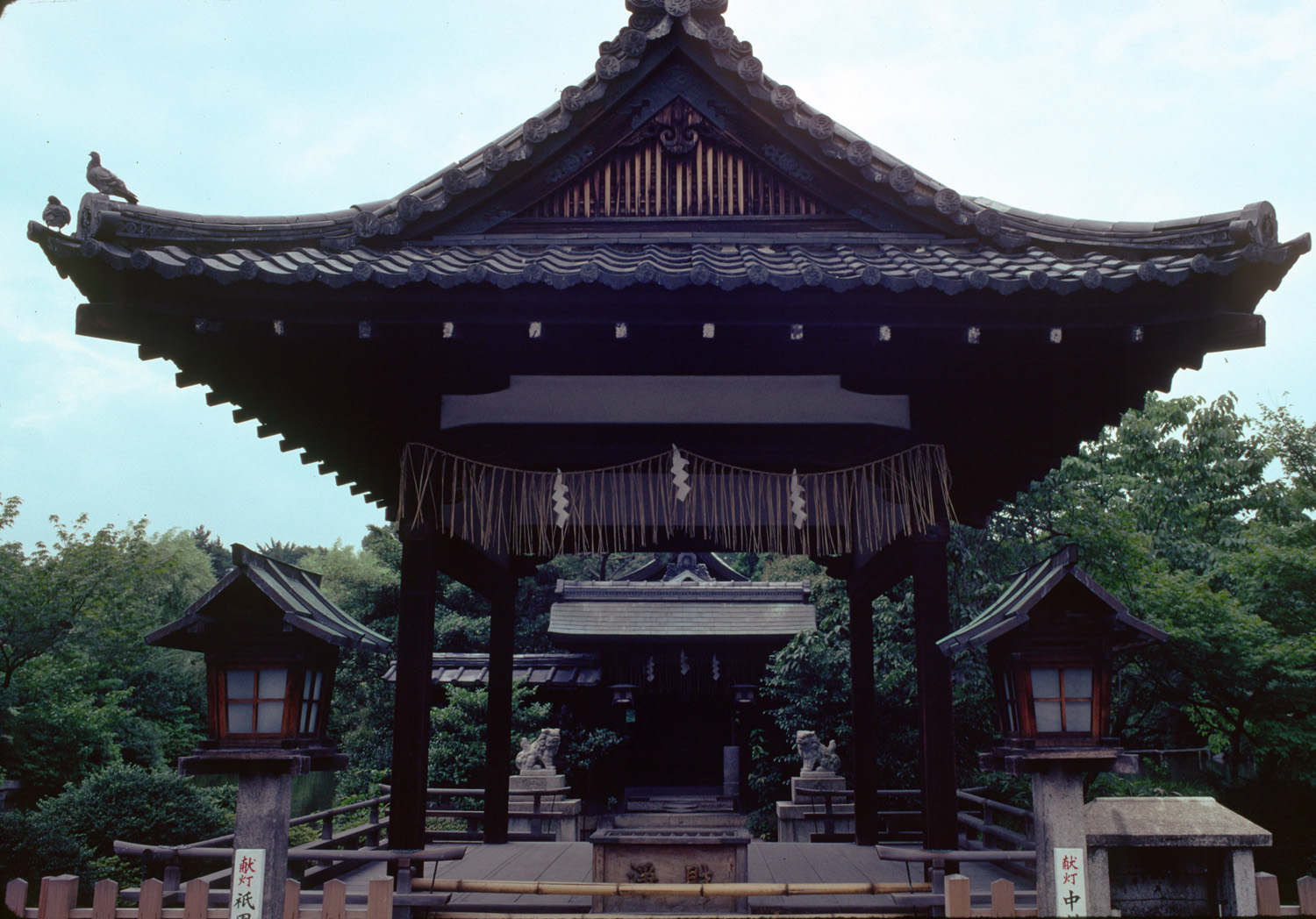
Zennyo Ryūō Shrine in the Shinsen'en

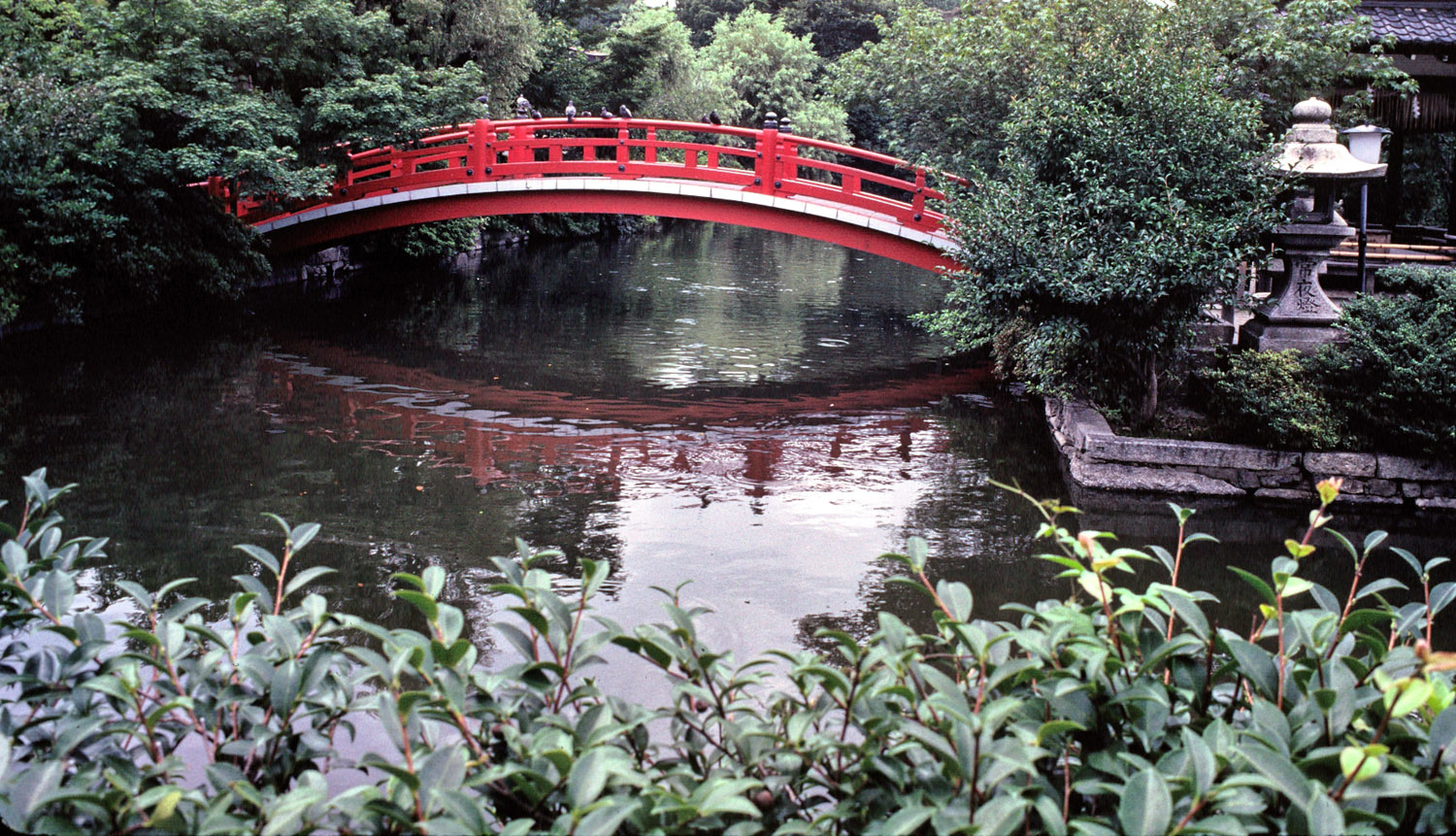
Hōsei Bridge in the Shinsen'en

The best-known appearance of Zennyo was during an 824 CE Buddhist rainmaking competition at the Shinsen'en or Shinzen'en 神泉苑 "Divine Spring Garden" in Kyoto. The scholar priest Kūkai or Kōbō-Daishi (774–835 CE), founder of Shingon "True Word" Buddhism, and his rival priest Shubin 守敏 held a rain-sutra recitation contest. Visser (1913:25) describes the Mahamegha sutra, Japanese Daiunkyō 大雲經 "Great Cloud Sutra" or Daiun Seiukyō 大雲請雨經 "Great Cloud Praying for Rain Sutra", as the "most important of the sūtras, recited by the Northern Buddhists for causing rain in times of drought". In 823 CE, Emperor Saga (r. 809–823) put Kūkai in charge of the Tō-ji "East Temple" and Shubin in charge of the Sai-ji "West Temple". In the next year, a 3-month drought occurred and Emperor Junna (r. 823–833) ordered Kūkai and Shubin to perform rainmaking ceremonies.

Zennyo is worshipped at the Zennyo Ryūō-sha 善女竜王社 Shinto shrine on an island in the Shinsen'en, reached by crossing the Hōsei-bashi 法成橋 "Dharma Completion Bridge".

Some versions of this Kūkai story record Zennyo coming from Mount Murō and others from Lake Anavatapta, which is at the center of the world in Buddhist cosmology. Anavatapta was also the name of a Nāga "snake; dragon" king, a Nagaraja "Dragon King", who lived in this namesake lake. According to Mahayana tradition (Visser 1913:4), Anavatapta was one of the Hachi-ryūō 八龍王 "8 Dragon Kings" that first heard the Buddha preach the Lotus Sutra.

Various early Japanese texts record legends about Kūkai invoking the rain-dragon Zennyo. The 835 CE Goyuigō 御遺告, which records Kūkai's last words, first describes Zennyo (Fowler 1997:154) as, "a golden snake measuring eight sun 寸 (approx. 24 cm) riding on the head of a dragon measuring nine shaku 尺 (approx. 2.7 m). This description is repeated in several other literary sources."

The early 12th-century Konjaku Monogatarishū "Collection of Tales About Times Now Past" gives this account.

[I]n a time of heavy drought the Emperor ordered [Kōbō-Daishi ] to cause rain, and the saint for seven days practised the Doctrine of the Rain-praying-sūtra in the Sacred Spring Park. Then there appeared on the right side of the altar a snake, five shaku long, carrying a little gold-coloured snake, about five sun in length, and after a while both disappeared into the pond. Only four of the twenty priests who were sitting in a row could see the apparition. One of these elected ones asked what it meant, whereupon another answered that the appearance of the Indian dragon-king Zennyo, 善如, who lived in India in the Anavatapta pond and was now living in the pond of the Sacred Spring Park, was a sign that the doctrine would be successful. And really, a dark cloud rose up in the Northwest, and soon the rain was pouring down. Thenceforth, whenever drought prevailed, the same doctrine was practised in the park, and never in vain. (tr. Visser 1913:162)

The Kojidan elaborates the rainmaking story, It says the Emperor first permitted Shubin's request to practice the rain sutra ceremonies, but this only caused showers in the Kyoto area. Kūkai promised to make it rain throughout Japan, and after reciting sutras for seven days without rainfall, he went into mediation and realized that his rival had secretly used magical tantra to capture all the dragons and shut them up in a pitcher. He continued reciting rain prayers for two more days, and said,

"In this pond is a dragon, called Zennyo, who pities mankind. To him I have prayed, and now I see him rising out of the midst of the lake, gold-coloured, about eight sun long, seated on the head of another dragon, eight shaku in length". This was reported to the Emperor, who soon sent a messenger with offerings for the Dragon-King. And when the seven days of the new vow had expired, a heavy thunderstorm broke forth and a torrent of rain came down all over the country, so that the water of the pond overflowed the altar. As a reward for having saved the people from starvation, Kūkai was elevated to the rank of Shōsōzu, bishop. (Visser 1913:163)

The c. 1372 CE Taiheiki "Record of the Great Peace" expands the rainmaking story and says Shubin became jealous of Kūkai's successes after returning from China in 806 CE. He magically caused the 824 drought by using tantras to capture "all the dragon-gods of the inner and outer seas".

Then Kōbō-Daishi reported to the Emperor that there was only one dragon, a Bodhisattva of higher rank than Shubin, namely the Dragon-king Zennyo of the Auavatapta pond in Northern India, who was not in Shubin's power. Immediately a pond was dug before the Palace and filled with pure water, whereupon Kōbō invited the dragon-king to come and live there. And behold, a gold-coloured dragon, eight sun long, appeared, seated on the head of a snake, more than nine shaku in length, and entered the pond. When Kōbō had reported this lucky news, the Emperor sent a messenger with all kinds of offerings in order to worship the Dragon-king. The result was marvellous, for soon it rained for three days all over the Empire. (Visser 1913:164)

Kūkai constructed a straw dragon effigy and declared he would transform it into a dragon king who would return to Lake Anavatapta, thus causing the original rain-dragon to stay in the park. He instructed his Shingon priests to pray to Zennyo whenever Japan suffered from droughts. Fowler (1997:157–159) contrasts the present-day autumn festival at Ryūketsu Shrine, where abstract dragons are fashioned out of straw cords and maple leaves, but are no longer associated with rain prayers to Zennyo.

== See also ==
- Naga (Rain dragon in Thai mythology)
- Ryūjin
