= Mita-Ōsawa Kofun Cluster =

Kofun burial mound in Japan

Mita-Ōsawa Kofun cluster
- 見田・大沢古墳群 (Japanese)
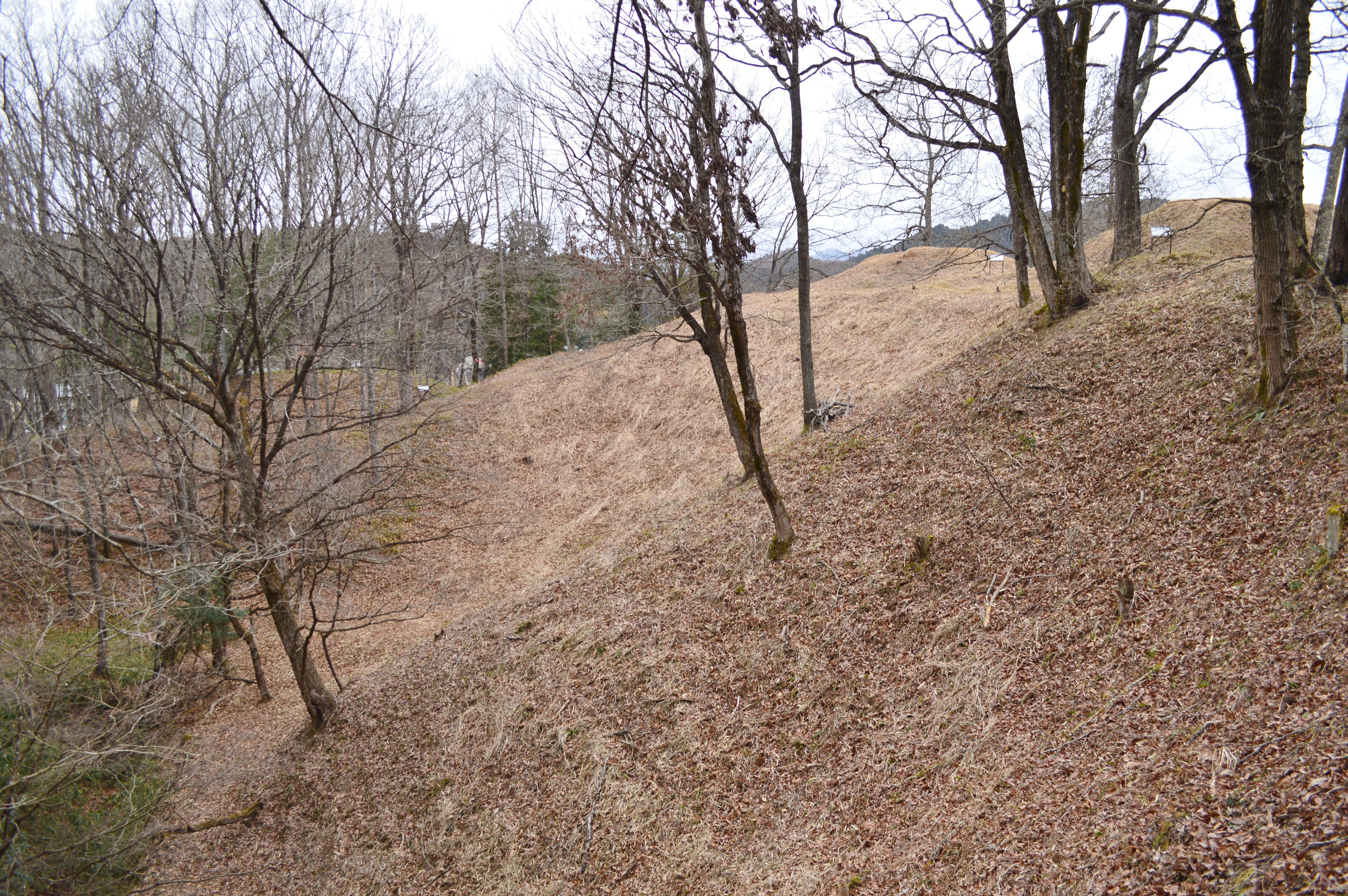
- Mita-Ōsawa Kofun cluster

- Mita-Ōsawa Kofun cluster Mita-Ōsawa Kofun Cluster (Japan)
- Interactive map of Mita-Ōsawa Kofun cluster
- 34°28′51″N 135°58′27″E
- Type: kofun
- Periods: Kofun period
- Location: Uda, Nara, Japan

History
- Built: 4th century AD

Site notes
- Public access: Yes (no facilities)

The Mita-Ōsawa Kofun Cluster (見田・大沢古墳群, Mita-Ōsawa Kofun gun) is a group of early Kofun period burial mounds located in the Mita and Ōsawa neighborhoods of the city of Uda, Nara Prefecture, Japan. The site was designated a National Historic Site of Japan in 1983.

== Overview ==
The Mita-Ōsawa Kofun Cluster is located on a ridge at an elevation of about 360 to 370 meters in the Uda Basin, southeast of the Nara Basin. Archaeological excavations in 1980 discovered burial mounds and remains of medieval residences. This group of burial mounds consists of one zenpō-kōhō-fun (前方後方墳), which is shaped like a keyhole, consisting of two conjoined rectangles, when viewed from above, and four square hōfun (方墳) tumuli, each separated by a moat. Kofun No. 1, 2, and 3 are built on the ridge that runs north to south, and Kofun No. 4 and 5 are built on the ridge that runs east to west. Many grave goods been recovered from the burial chambers of each of these tombs, and indicate that the construction period was at the start of Kofun period, at a time when the large zenpō-kōen-fun tumuli were starting to appear in the Nara Basin.

Mita-Ōsawa Kofun Cluster
Name	Image	Type	Dimensions	burial facility	Grave goods
Kofun No.1		keyhole-shaped	27.5 meter length 20 meters diameter circular portion 12.7 meters wide rectangular portion	details unknown	
Kofun No.2		Square	14 meters per side 1.7 meters high	Direct burial in split bamboo coffin	bronze mirror, amber magatama, small glass beads, chlorite schist beads, hatchet, Haji ware
Kofun No.3		Square	16 meters per side 3 meters high	Unknown due to grave robbing	iron swords, arrowheads, Haji ware
Kofun No.4		Square	17meters per side 3 meters high	Direct burial in split bamboo coffin	Four-beast mirror, magatama, cylindrical beads, iron sword, Haji ware
Kofun No.5		Square	14 meters per side 3.2 meters high	Direct burial in split bamboo coffin	Haji ware

== See also ==
- List of Historic Sites of Japan (Nara)
