= Murō-ji =

Buddhist temple in Nara Prefecture, Japan

- 室生寺
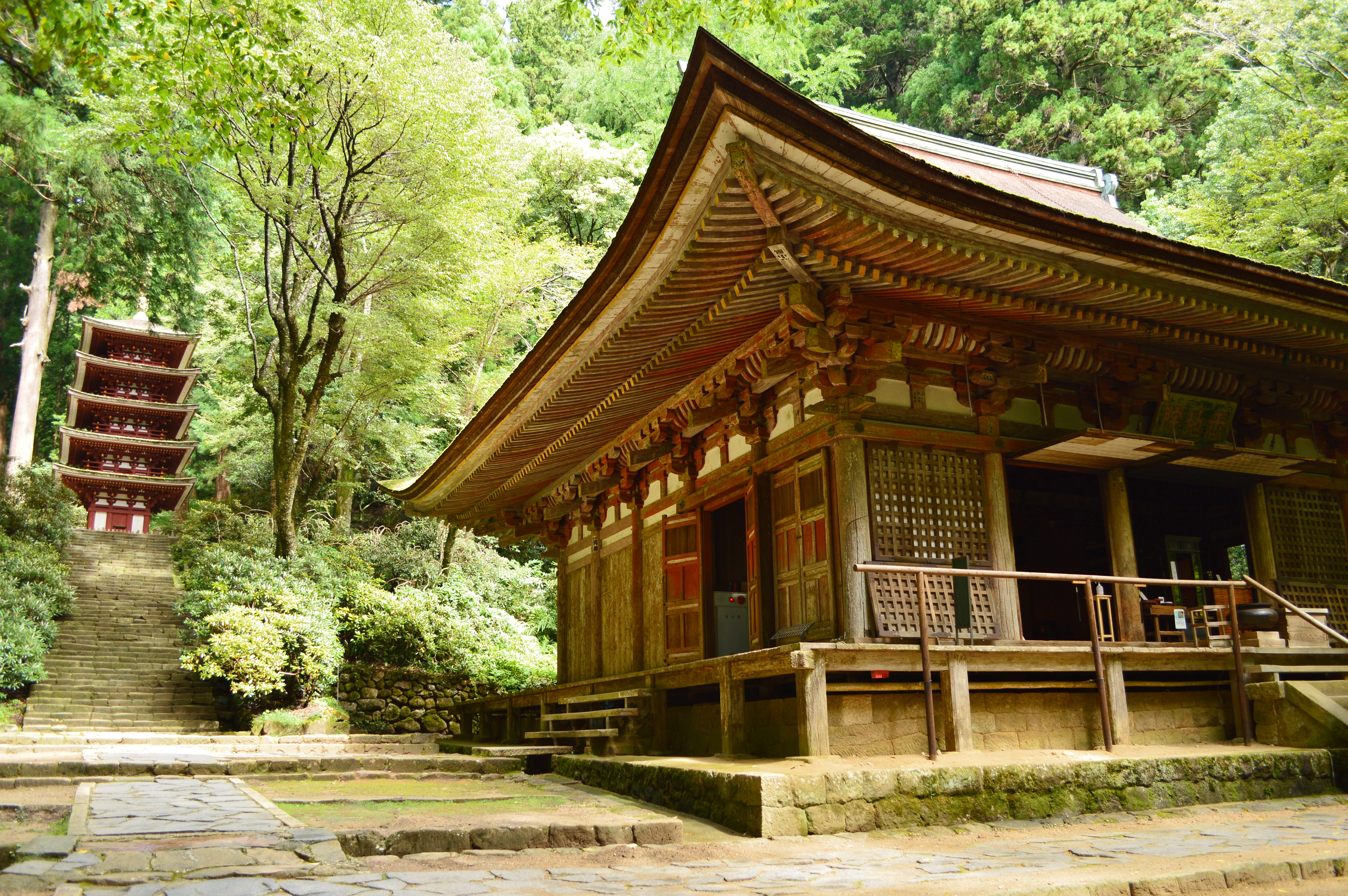
- The temple's five-storied pagoda (left) and main hall (right)

Religion
- Affiliation: Buddhism
- Rite: Omoto Shingon

Location
- Location: Uda, Nara Prefecture
- Country: Japan
- Interactive map of Murō-ji
- Coordinates: 34°32′16.39″N 136°2′26.22″E

Architecture
- Established: 8th century

Website
- www.murouji.or.jp

Murō-ji (Japanese: 室生寺) is a Shingon Buddhist temple located in the city of Uda, Nara Prefecture, Japan. It lays on the mountainside of Mount Murō (室生山, Murō-san) and historically served as a place of worship for the Japanese dragon associated with rain prayers known as Zennyo Ryūō. Its five-storied pagoda (五重塔, gojū-no-tō) is one of the oldest standing pagodas in Japan, dating its construction to the 9th century.

== History ==
While legend has it that the temple was founded by the monk En no Gyōja by order of Emperor Tenmu, and later restored by Kūkai, an extant record kept by the temple, Murō-ji ryaku engi (室生寺略縁起), tells that a successful ritual in respect of a local dragon spirit to cure Prince Yamabe (later Emperor Kanmu)'s illness made the imperial court order a monk from the nearby temple of Kōfuku-ji, named Kenkyō (賢璟), to construct a new temple on the site.

Historically, the temple acted as a place of worship for a Japanese dragon spirit associated with Ryūjin known as Zennyo Ryūō, and rain prayer offerings were traditionally held there. The numerous caves spread around Mount Murō were believed to be carved out by the dragon, and are still considered sacred.

During most of its history, Murō-ji was a subtemple of Kōfuku-ji, from the nearby city of Nara. Monks from Kofuku-ji were regularly sent to the temple for summer prayer retreats (参龍, sanrō) until its separation in 1694. The Shinto Ryūketsu Shrine used to be part of the temple complex until 1868, as efforts were made to separate Shinto and Buddhist institutions.

Unlike many temples of the time, Murō-ji was open to females. For that reason, the temple is also called Mount Kōya for women.

=== Present ===
Worship of the Murō dragon continues to the present day in the form of a festival called the Autumn Ryūketsu Shrine festival. During the month of October, two figures of a dragon in straw are placed on the grounds of Murō-ji and on the road to the Ryūketsu Shrine. The next day, the head priest of Murō-ji begins a procession between the temple and the Ryūketsu Shrine, stopping to conduct rituals in favor of the two straw dragon figures. While rain prayer practices are absent, the Murō dragon still serves as an important tradition of the temple.

=== Pagoda ===
Among the buildings that remain on the temple complex from the ninth century is a five-storied pagoda which is the smallest of the kind standing in the open air. The pagoda suffered major damage in a 1998 typhoon, but it was restored over the following two years.

== See also ==
- List of National Treasures of Japan (temples)
- List of National Treasures of Japan (paintings)
- List of National Treasures of Japan (sculptures)
