= Murō, Nara =

Dissolved municipality in Nara prefecture, Japan

Murō (室生村, Murō-mura) was a village located in Uda District, Nara Prefecture, Japan.

As of 2005, the village had an estimated population of 5,939 and a density of 55.00 persons per km^{2}. The total area was 107.99 km^{2}.

On January 1, 2006, Murō, along with the towns of Haibara, Ōuda and Utano (all from Uda District), was merged to create the city of Uda.
