= Haibara, Nara =

Dissolved municipality in Nara prefecture, Japan

Haibara (榛原町, Haibara-chō) was a town located in Uda District, Nara Prefecture, Japan.

As of 2005, the town had an estimated population of 18,708 and a density of 290.45 persons per km^{2}. The total area was 64.41 km^{2}.

On January 1, 2006, Haibara, along with the towns of Ōuda and Utano, and the village of Murō (all from Uda District), was merged to create the city of Uda.

== Hawken Exchange Program ==
Through the Haibara/Hawken Exchange Program children in Hawken middle school experience life in Haibara to understand the different culture. They go to Haibara Junior High School for one day to view the education system, live with families in Haibara to see what life is like there, and upon returning home, they share their knowledge and experiences with the community. Additionally, they visit the city of Nara which is the seat of the Nation's first permanent capital and the birthplace of Japan's Buddhist culture."
