= Utano, Nara =

Former town in Nara Prefecture, Japan

Utano (菟田野町, Utano-chō) was a town located in Uda District, Nara Prefecture, Japan.

As of 2005, the town had an estimated population of 4,746 and a density of 170.84 persons per km^{2}. The total area was 27.78 km^{2}.

On January 1, 2006, Utano, along with the towns of Haibara and Ōuda, and the village of Murō (all from Uda District), was merged to create the city of Uda.
