= Soekami District, Nara =

Former district in Nara prefecture, Japan

Soekami (添上郡, Soekami-gun) was a district located in Nara Prefecture, Japan.

As of 2003, the district had an estimated population of 1,913 and a density of 89.60 persons per km^{2}. The total area was 21.35 km^{2}.

== Former towns and villages ==
- Tsukigase

== Merger ==
- On April 1, 2005 - the village of Tsukigase, along with the Tsuge (from Yamabe District), was merged into the expanded city of Nara. Soekami District was dissolved as a result of this merger.
