= Uda, Nara =

Uda 宇陀市
- City
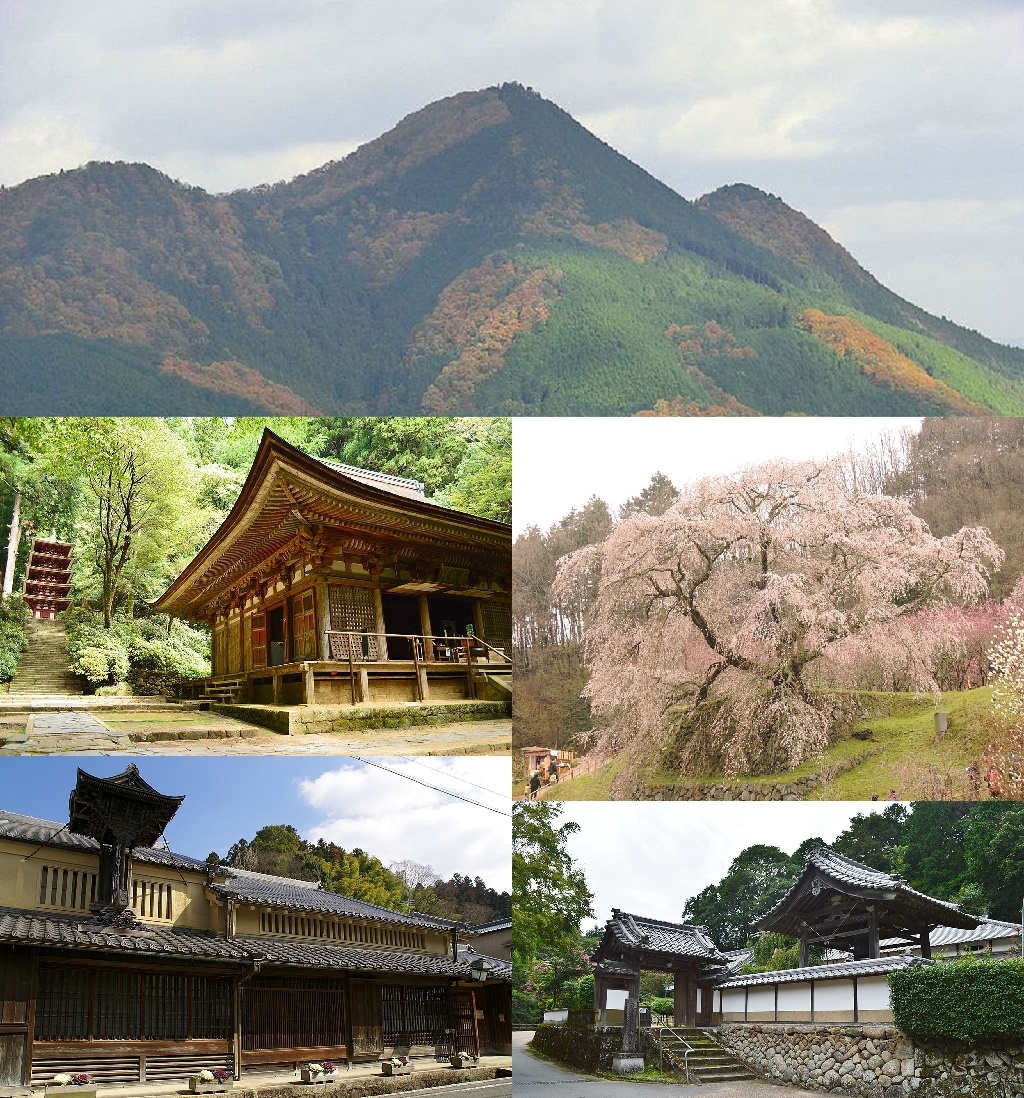
- Clockwise from top: Mount Nukai, Murō-ji, Matabei Sakura, Matsuyama, and Ōno-ji

- Flag Seal
- Location of Uda in Nara Prefecture

- Location in Japan
- Coordinates: 34°31′41″N 135°57′08″E
- Country: Japan
- Region: Kansai
- Prefecture: Nara

Government
  - Mayor: Kazutoshi Kongō

Area
  - Total: 247.50 km^{2} (95.56 sq mi)

Population (October 1, 20124)
  - Total: 26,814
  - Density: 108.34/km^{2} (280.60/sq mi)
- Time zone: UTC+09:00 (JST)
- City hall address: 17-3 Shimoidari, Haibara-ku, Uda-shi, Nara-ken 633-0292
- Climate: Cfa
- Website: Official website
- Symbols
- Bird: Japanese Bush Warbler
- Flower: Lily of the Valley
- Tree: Hinoki

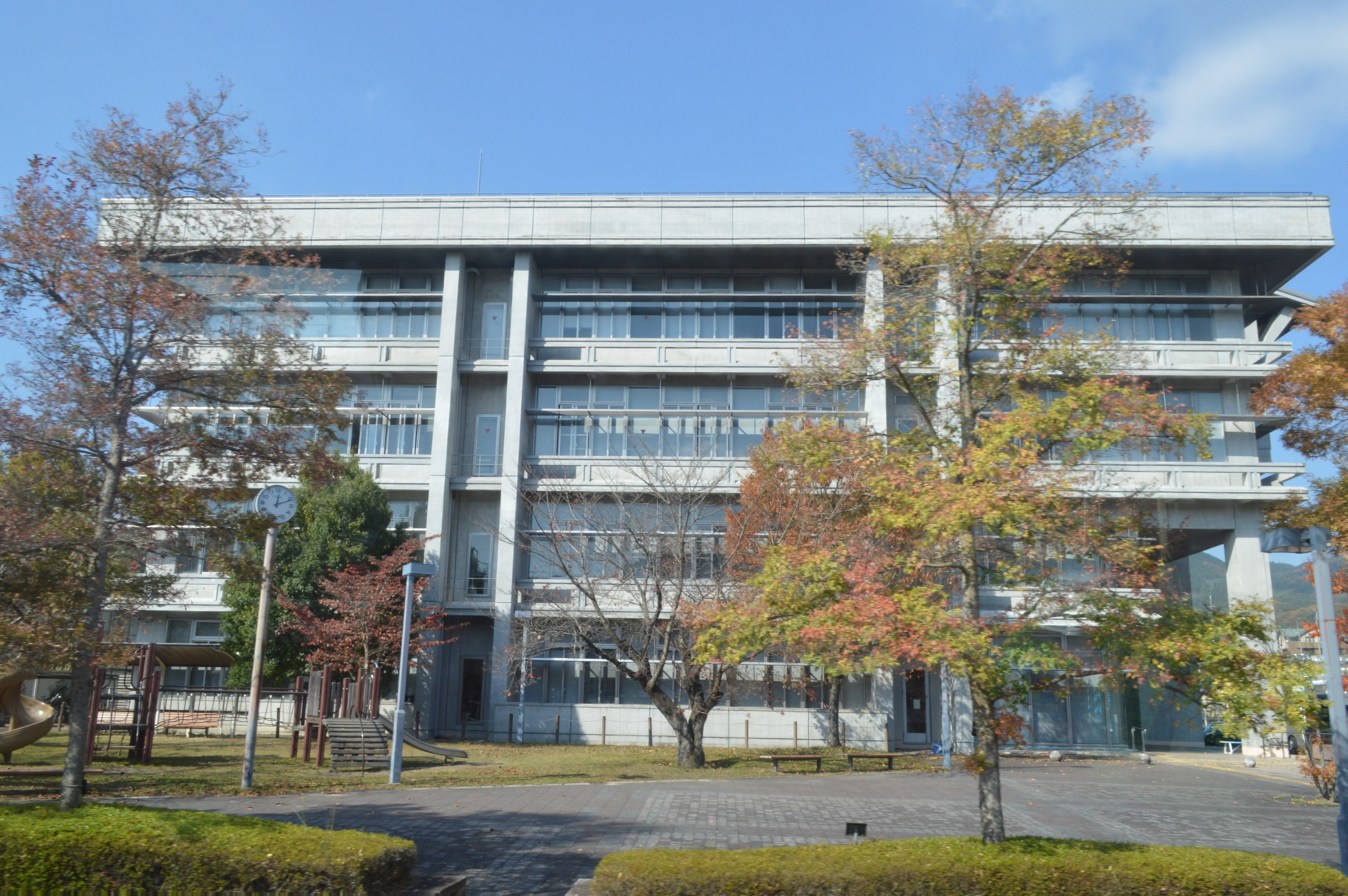
Uda City Hall

Uda (宇陀市, Uda-shi; Japanese pronunciation: [ɯ̈́.dä̀, ɯ̈̀.dä́.ɕì]) is a city located in northeastern Nara Prefecture, Japan. As of 1 October 2024, the city had an estimated population of 26,814 in 12647 households, and a population density of 110 persons per km^{2}. The total area of the city is 247.50 km^{2} (95.56 sq mi).

== Geography ==
Uda is located in northeastern Nara Prefecture. The terrain is flat land along the Uda River and Yoshino River, surrounded by mountains, and most of it is forested. The old urban areas of the former Utano Town area, the former Ouda Town area, and the former Haibara Town area are located on flat land, but the rest of the area is mountainous and has settlements scattered in narrow areas. The north side of the former Haibara Town area, the north and south sides of the former Muro Village area, and the south side of the former Utano Town area are connected to high mountainous areas.

=== Neighboring municipalities ===
Mie Prefecture

- Nabari

Nara Prefecture

- Higashiyoshino
- Nara
- Sakurai
- Soni
- Yamazoe
- Yoshino

=== Climate ===
Uda has a humid subtropical climate (Köppen climate classification Cfa), which is hot and humid in the summer (above 30 °C (86 °F)) and is somewhat cold in the winter with temperatures dropping to around freezing (0 °C (32 °F)). The average annual temperature in Uda is 12.3 °C. The average annual rainfall is 1893 mm with September as the wettest month. The temperatures are highest on average in August, at around 24.0 °C, and lowest in January, at around 0.7 °C.

Climate data for Ōuda, Uda (1991−2020 normals, extremes 1978−present), elevation 349 m (1,145 ft))
Month	Jan	Feb	Mar	Apr	May	Jun	Jul	Aug	Sep	Oct	Nov	Dec	Year
Record high °C (°F)	18.2 (64.8)	21.5 (70.7)	23.4 (74.1)	28.8 (83.8)	31.9 (89.4)	33.6 (92.5)	35.4 (95.7)	36.5 (97.7)	35.1 (95.2)	30.6 (87.1)	25.7 (78.3)	23.7 (74.7)	36.5 (97.7)
Mean daily maximum °C (°F)	7.0 (44.6)	8.1 (46.6)	12.4 (54.3)	18.3 (64.9)	23.1 (73.6)	25.9 (78.6)	29.6 (85.3)	31.0 (87.8)	26.8 (80.2)	20.9 (69.6)	15.3 (59.5)	9.7 (49.5)	19.0 (66.2)
Daily mean °C (°F)	2.1 (35.8)	2.6 (36.7)	5.9 (42.6)	11.4 (52.5)	16.5 (61.7)	20.4 (68.7)	24.3 (75.7)	25.1 (77.2)	21.2 (70.2)	15.1 (59.2)	9.2 (48.6)	4.2 (39.6)	13.2 (55.7)
Mean daily minimum °C (°F)	−2.2 (28.0)	−2.2 (28.0)	0.1 (32.2)	4.8 (40.6)	10.4 (50.7)	15.8 (60.4)	20.1 (68.2)	20.6 (69.1)	16.7 (62.1)	10.1 (50.2)	3.9 (39.0)	−0.5 (31.1)	8.1 (46.6)
Record low °C (°F)	−8.7 (16.3)	−9.3 (15.3)	−6.8 (19.8)	−4.3 (24.3)	−0.5 (31.1)	5.3 (41.5)	11.3 (52.3)	11.8 (53.2)	5.5 (41.9)	−1.1 (30.0)	−4.3 (24.3)	−8.7 (16.3)	−9.3 (15.3)
Average precipitation mm (inches)	65.1 (2.56)	77.2 (3.04)	113.0 (4.45)	107.6 (4.24)	138.8 (5.46)	194.5 (7.66)	202.5 (7.97)	151.5 (5.96)	181.5 (7.15)	168.1 (6.62)	86.2 (3.39)	67.1 (2.64)	1,553.3 (61.15)
Average precipitation days (≥ 1.0 mm)	9.2	9.6	11.7	10.9	10.7	13.4	12.8	9.4	11.6	10.8	8.5	9.6	128.2
Mean monthly sunshine hours	97.5	110.1	152.3	179.2	187.2	133.8	158.6	204.3	145.4	144.9	131.2	107.2	1,750.7
Source: Japan Meteorological Agency

=== Demographics ===
Per Japanese census data, the population of Uda in 2020 is 28,121 people. Uda has been conducting censuses since 1950.

Historical population

Year	Pop.	±%
1950	43,376	—
1955	41,895	−3.4%
1960	41,569	−0.8%
1965	38,746	−6.8%
1970	37,963	−2.0%
1975	37,269	−1.8%
1980	41,101	+10.3%
1985	41,874	+1.9%

Year	Pop.	±%
1990	41,736	−0.3%
1995	42,035	+0.7%
2000	39,762	−5.4%
2005	37,183	−6.5%
2010	34,233	−7.9%
2015	31,105	−9.1%
2020	28,121	−9.6%

Uda population statistics

== History ==
The area of Uda was part of ancient Yamato Province. The name of "Uda" appears in ancient texts, including the Nara period Man'yōshū. During the Sengoku period and early Edo period, it was ruled from Uda Matsuyama Castle and was part of Uda-Matsuyama Domain until 1695, and part of the tenryō holdings of the Tokugawa shogunate to the Meiji restoration. Many historic buildings have been preserved in the old castle town. The town of Matsuyama was established with the creation of the modern municipalities system on April 1, 1889. It became the town of Ōuda on February 11, 1942. The city of Uda was established on January 1, 2006, the towns of Haibara, Ōuda and Utano, and the village of Murō (all from Uda District).

== Government ==
Uda has a mayor-council form of government with a directly elected mayor and a unicameral city council of 14 members. Uda, collectively with the villages in Uda district contributes one member to the Nara Prefectural Assembly. In terms of national politics, the city is part of the Nara 3rd district of the lower house of the Diet of Japan.

== Economy ==
The economy of Uda is based on agriculture and forestry. However, due to its mountainous location, there is little farmland, with only small terraced paddy fields and fields developed in the 1970s as part of prefectural projects, and local vegetables are sold at a few direct sales outlets, mainly for self-consumption. Along with Yoshino, the area was traditionally noted for its production of Kudzu powder.

== Education ==
Uda has six public elementary schools and four public junior high schools operated by the city government and one public high school operated by the Nara Prefectural Board of Education. There is also one private junior high school.

== Transportation ==
=== Railways ===
Kintetsu Railway - Osaka Line

Haibara - Murōguchiōno - Sambommatsu

=== Highways ===
- Nishi-Meihan Expressway
- Keinawa Expressway
- National Route 165
- National Route 166
- National Route 369
- National Route 370

== Local attractions ==
- Murō-ji - A temple with the five-storied pagoda of Murō-ji
- Uda Matsuyama Castle - A castle ruin, one of the Continued Top 100 Japanese Castles
- Uda Mikumari Shrine - A shrine, one of the National Treasures of Japan
- Ōno-dera, with National Historic Site magaibutsu
- Mita-Ōsawa Kofun Cluster, National Historic Site
- Morino physic garden, National Historic Site
