= Tsuge, Nara =

Dissolved municipality in Nara prefecture, Japan

Tsuge (都祁村, Tsuge-mura) was a village located in Yamabe District, Nara Prefecture, Japan.

As of 2003, the village had an estimated population of 6,712 and a density of 152.93 persons per km^{2}. The total area was 43.89 km^{2}.

On April 1, 2005, Tsuge, along with the village of Tsukigase (from Soekami District), was merged into the expanded city of Nara.
