= Uda District, Nara =

District located in Nara Prefecture, Japan

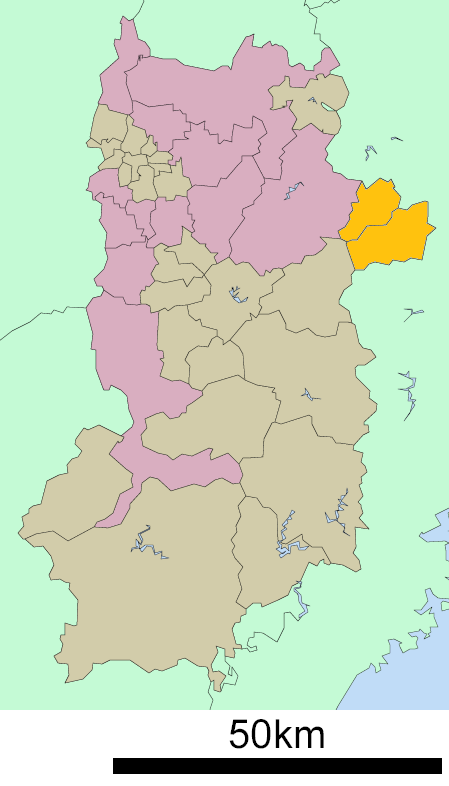
Location of Uda District in Nara Prefecture

Uda (宇陀郡, Uda-gun) is a district located in Nara Prefecture, Japan.

As of 2005, the district has an estimated population of 42,752 and a density of 113.98 persons per km^{2}. The total area is 375.09 km^{2}.

== Towns and villages ==
- Mitsue
- Soni

== Merger ==
- On January 1, 2006, the towns of Haibara, Murō and Ōuda, and the village of Utano merged to form the new city of Uda.
