= Ōuda, Nara =

Ōuda 大宇陀町
- Former municipality
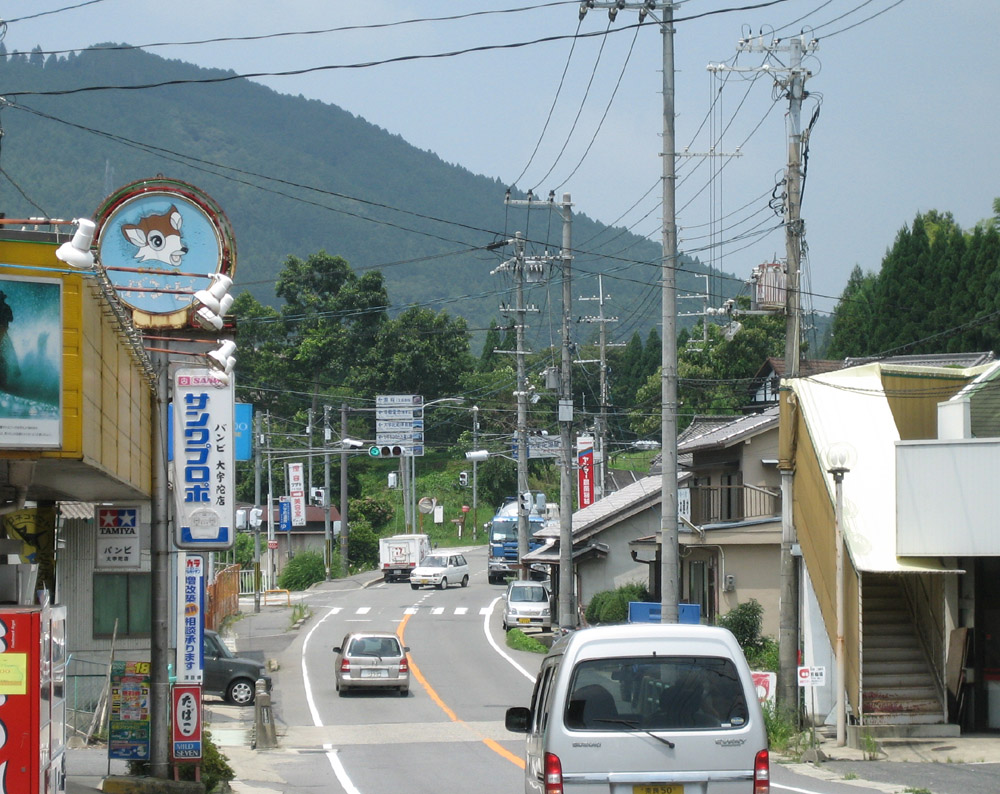
- The main street in Ōuda

- Location in Japan
- Coordinates: 34°28′44.2″N 135°55′41.1″E
- Country: Japan
- Region: Kansai (Kinki)
- Prefecture: Nara Prefecture
- District: Uda
- Merged: January 1, 2006 (now part of Uda)

Area
  - Total: 47.44 km^{2} (18.32 sq mi)

Population (2005)
  - Total: 8,647
  - Density: 182.3/km^{2} (472.1/sq mi)
- Time zone: UTC+09:00 (JST)
- Website: City of Uda
- Symbols
- Bird: Bunting
- Flower: Pinwheel
- Tree: Oak

Ōuda (大宇陀町, Ōuda-chō) was a town located in Uda District, Nara Prefecture, Japan.

As of 2005, the town had an estimated population of 8,647 and a density of 182.27 persons per km^{2}. The total area was 47.44 km^{2}.

On January 1, 2006, Ōuda, along with the towns of Haibara and Utano (all from Uda District), was merged to create the city of Uda.

The town of Ōuda lies in a valley between two long mountain ranges in northeastern Nara, Japan. A three-mile long stretch of national routes 166 and 370 in the southern part of the town is where most of the businesses and homes are clustered. A large portion of flat land north on route 370 is less densely populated, covered mostly by rice fields. A large torii, or Japanese Gate, rises out of the rice paddies.

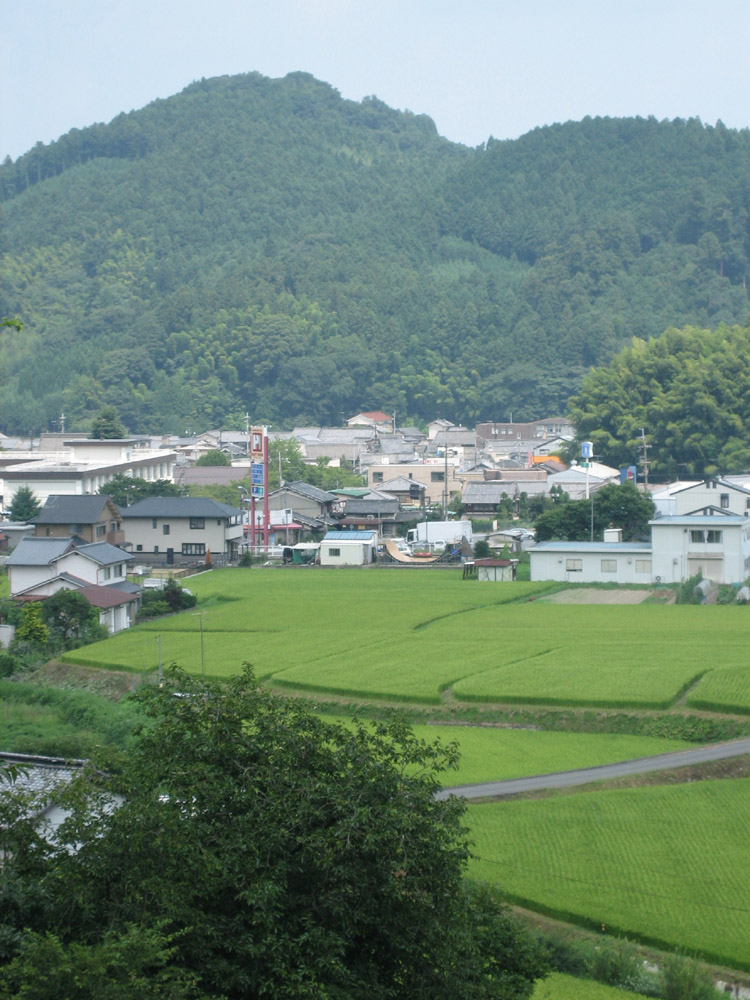

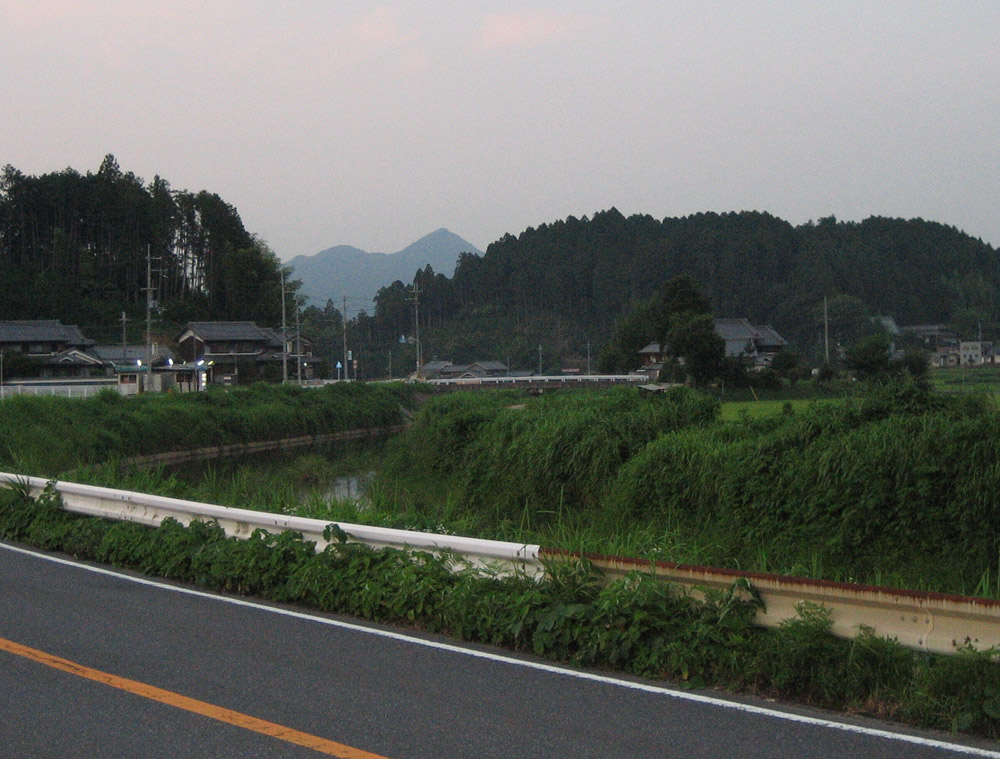
The outskirts of Ōuda
