= Yamabe District, Nara =

District in Nara prefecture, Japan

Coordinates: 34.6648°N 136.022°E

Location of Yamabe District in Nara Prefecture

Yamabe (山辺郡, Yamabe-gun) is a district located in Nara Prefecture, Japan.

As of 2003, the district has an estimated population of 11,427 and a density of 103.46 persons per km^{2}. The total area is 110.45 km^{2}.

== Towns and villages ==
- Yamazoe

== Merger ==
- On April 1, 2005, the village of Tsuge merged into the city of Nara.
