= Natsuko =

- Pronunciation: Ná-ts(ú)-kó
- Gender: Female

Origin
- Origin: Japanese
- Meaning: It can have many different meanings depending on the kanji used.

Other names
- Related names: Atsuko; Matsuko; Natsuki; Natsumi; Natsume

Natsuko (なつこ, ナツコ) is a feminine Japanese given name.

== Written forms ==
Natsuko can be written using different kanji characters and can mean:

- 夏子, "summer, child"
- 懐子, "reminiscence, yearn, child"
- 捺子, "press, print, affix a seal, stamp, child"
- 奈津子 "Nara, harbor, child"
- 菜津子 "vegetables, harbor, child"
- 那津子 "what, harbor, child"

The name can also be written in hiragana なつこ, or katakana ナツコ.

== People ==
with the given name Natsuko

- Natsuko Abe (阿部 菜摘子), Japanese voice actress
- Natsuko Aso (麻生 夏子; born 1990), Japanese musician and actress
- Natsuko Doi (土井 奈津子; born 1979), Japanese snowboarder
- Natsuko Fujimori (藤森 奈津子; born 1961), Japanese retired professional shogi player
- Natsuko Godai (伍代 夏子; born 1961), Japanese enka singer
- Natsuko Hara (原 菜摘子; born 1989), Japanese former football player
- Natsuko Hashimoto (橋本 夏子; 1856–1873), Japanese concubine
- Natsuko Higuchi (樋口 夏子; 1872–1896), Japanese writer during the Meiji era
- Natsuko Imamura (今村 夏子; born 1980), Japanese writer
- Natsuko Kahara (賀原 夏子; 1921–1991), Japanese stage and film actress
- Natsuko Kuroda (黒田 夏子; born 1937), Japanese writer
- Natsuko Kuwatani (桑谷 夏子; born 1978), Japanese voice actress
- Natsuko Matsuda (松田 奈津子; born 1947), Japanese swimmer
- Natsuko Ohama, Canadian vocal coach, actress, and director
- Natsuko Oki (大木 奈津子; born 1989), Japanese actress, singer and columnist
- Natsuko Takahashi (高橋ナツコ), Japanese anime screenwriter
- Natsuko Tanihara (谷原 菜摘子; born 1989), Japanese artist
- Natsuko Toda (戸田 奈津子; born 1936), Japanese subtitler and film industry interpreter
- Natsuko Tora (刀羅 ナツコ; born 1991), Japanese professional wrestler
- Natsuko Sone (曽根 菜津子; born 1985), Japanese competitive eater and singer
- Natsuko Yamamoto (山本 奈津子; born 1965), Japanese actress
- Natsuko Yokosawa (横澤 夏子; born 1990), Japanese comedian

== Fictional characters ==
with the given name Natsuko

- Natsuko Aki (夏子), a character in the Japanese live action drama series Cutie Honey The Live
- Natsuko Koshino (夏子), a character in the anime series Futari wa Pretty Cure (known as Summer in the English dub)
- Natsuko Shōno (ナツ子), a character from the manga and anime series Kinnikuman and its sequel Kinnikuman Nisei
- Natsuko (夏子), a character in the anime movie The Boy and the Heron
- Natsuko Hirose, main character of Zenshu (TV series).
