= Natsumi =

- Pronunciation: Ná-ts(ú)-mí
- Gender: Female

Origin
- Origin: Japanese
- Meaning: Different depending on the kanji used

Other names
- Related names: Natsuki; Natsuko

Natsumi (なつみ, ナツミ) is a feminine Japanese given name which is occasionally used as a surname.

== Written forms ==
Natsumi can be written using different kanji characters and can mean:

as a given name

- 夏美, "summer, beauty"
- 夏実, "summer, truth"
- 夏未, "summer, still"
- 夏海, "summer, sea"
- 夏生, "summer, life"
- 奈津美 "Nara, harbor, beauty"
- 奈津実 " Nara, harbor, truth"

as a surname

- 夏見, "summer, look"

The given name can also be written in hiragana or katakana.

== Places ==
- Natsumi (夏見), a place located in Funabashi, Chiba, Japan
- Natsumi Temple complex (夏見廃寺), a Japanese archaeological site

== People ==
=== Given name ===
- Natsumi Abe (安倍 なつみ; born 1981), Japanese singer and actress
- Natsumi Akiyama (秋山 なつみ; born 1994), Japanese handball player
- Natsumi Ando (安藤 なつみ), Japanese manga artist
- Natsumi Asano (浅野 菜摘; born 1997), Japanese professional footballer
- Natsumi Fujita (藤田 夏未; born 1991), Japanese volleyball player
- Natsumi Fujiwara (藤原 夏海; born 1993), Japanese voice actress
- Natsumi Hamamura (浜村 夏美; born 1984), Japanese tennis player
- Natsumi Hanamura (花村 夏実; born 2008), Japanese rhythmic gymnast
- Natsumi Hara (原 奈津美; born 1988), Japanese football player
- Natsumi Haruse (春瀬 なつみ; born 1994), Japanese voice actress
- Natsumi Hioka (日岡 なつみ; born 1991), Japanese voice actress
- Natsumi Hirajima (平嶋 夏海; born 1992), Japanese tarento and actress
- Natsumi Hoshi (星 奈津美; born 1990), Japanese swimmer
- Natsumi Ikegaya (池ヶ谷 夏美; born 1990), Japanese professional footballer
- Natsumi Ikema (池間 夏海; born 2002), Japanese actress
- Natsumi Itsuki (樹 なつみ; born 1960), Japanese manga artist
- Natsumi Iwamura (岩村 捺未; born 1991), Japanese idol
- Natsumi Kawaguchi (川口夏実; born 2002), Japanese tennis player
- Natsumi Kawaida (川井田 夏海; born 1996), Japanese voice actress
- Natsumi Kawamura (born 1996), Japanese karateka
- Natsumi Kawanago (川中子 奈月心; born 2005), Japanese singer and member of ≠Me
- Natsumi Kiyoura (清 浦夏実; born 1990), Japanese actress and singer from Chiba
- Natsumi Kon (昆 夏美; born 1991), Japanese musical actress and singer
- Natsumi Maki (万喜なつみ; born 1995), Japanese professional wrestler
- Natsumi Matsubara (松原 夏海; born 1990), Japanese singer
- Natsumi Matsuoka (松岡 菜摘; born 1996), Japanese singer and former member of HKT48
- Natsumi Mizushima (水嶋 なつみ; born 1984), Japanese professional wrestler
- Natsumi Mukai (迎 夏生), Japanese manga artist
- Natsumi Murakami (村上 奈津実; born 1995), Japanese voice actress
- Natsumi Oda (小田 菜摘; born 2008), Japanese competition climber
- Natsumi Ogawa (小川 菜摘; born 1962), Japanese actress
- Natsumi Okamoto (岡本 夏美; born 1998), Japanese fashion model and actress
- Natsumi Oshima (大嶋 夏実; born 2002), Japanese field hockey player
- Natsumi Sakai (politician) (酒井 菜摘; born 1986), Japanese politician
- Natsumi Sakai (swimmer) (酒井 夏海; born 2001), Japanese swimmer
- Natsumi Sasada (笹田 夏実; born 1995), Japanese artistic gymnast
- Natsumi Showzuki (翔月 なつみ; born 1989), Japanese professional wrestler
- Natsumi Taguchi (田口 夏実; born 2000), Japanese singer and former member of Magnolia Factory
- Natsumi Takamori (高森 奈津美; born 1987), Japanese voice actress
- Natsumi Tanaka (田中菜津美; born 2000), Japanese singer and former member of HKT48
- Natsumi Tomonaga (朝長 なつ美; born 1991), Japanese modern pentathlete
- Natsumi Tsunoda (角田 夏実; born 1992), Japanese judoka
- Natsumi Tsuji (辻󠄀 菜摘; born 1992), known as the Nevada-tan murder, A Japanese girl known for murdering her classmate, Satomi Mitarai
- Natsumi Watanabe (渡辺 なつみ; born 1988), Japanese track and field athlete
- Natsumi Yabuuchi (薮内 夏美; born 1977), Japanese basketball player
- Natsumi Yanase (やなせ なつみ; born 1971), Japanese voice actress

=== Surname ===
- Hikaru Natsumi (菜摘 ひかる; 1973–2002), Japanese writer and sex worker
- Madoka Natsumi (夏見 円; born 1978), Japanese cross country skier

== Characters ==
- Natsumi Asaoka (朝丘夏美), a character in the anime and manga series The Pumpkin Wine
- Natsumi Asō (夏海), a character in the anime and manga series Sketchbook
- Natsumi Hikari, a character in Kamen Rider Decade
- Natsumi Rokudo, a character in Jungle de Ikou!
- Natsumi Hinata (日向 夏美), a character in the anime and manga series Sgt. Frog
- Natsumi Hyuga, a character in the anime and manga series Alice Academy
- Natsumi Kyouno, a character in the Date A Live series
- Natsumi Mizuki, a character in anime and manga series GetBackers
- Natsumi Murakami (村上 夏美), a character in the anime series Negima!
- Natsumi Hayama, a character from Kodomo no Omocha
- Natsumi Onitsuka (鬼塚 夏美), a character in the media franchise Love Live! Superstar!!
- Natsumi Shinohara / Yellow Racer, a character in Gekisou Sentai Carranger
- Natsumi Tsujimoto (辻本 夏実), a character in the You're Under Arrest franchise
- Natsumi Raimon (雷門 夏未), a character in Inazuma Eleven
- Natsumi Kuzuryu, a character from Danganronpa 3: The End of Hope's Peak High School
- Natsumi, a character in the video game series Ape Escape
- Natsumi Suga (須賀 夏美), a character in the 2019 animated film Weathering with You

== See also ==
- Nochiura Natsumi (後浦なつみ), a trio within the Hello! Project
