= 棗 =

棗 or 枣, may refer to:

- Jujube
- Natsume (disambiguation), Japanese feminine given name and surname
- Táo, translated "apple" for Vietnamese
- Zhang Zao (张枣; 1962–2010), Chinese poet

== See also ==
- Apple (disambiguation)
- Zao (disambiguation)
