= Hasedera Station =

Railway station in Sakurai, Nara Prefecture, Japan

Hasedera Station 長谷寺駅
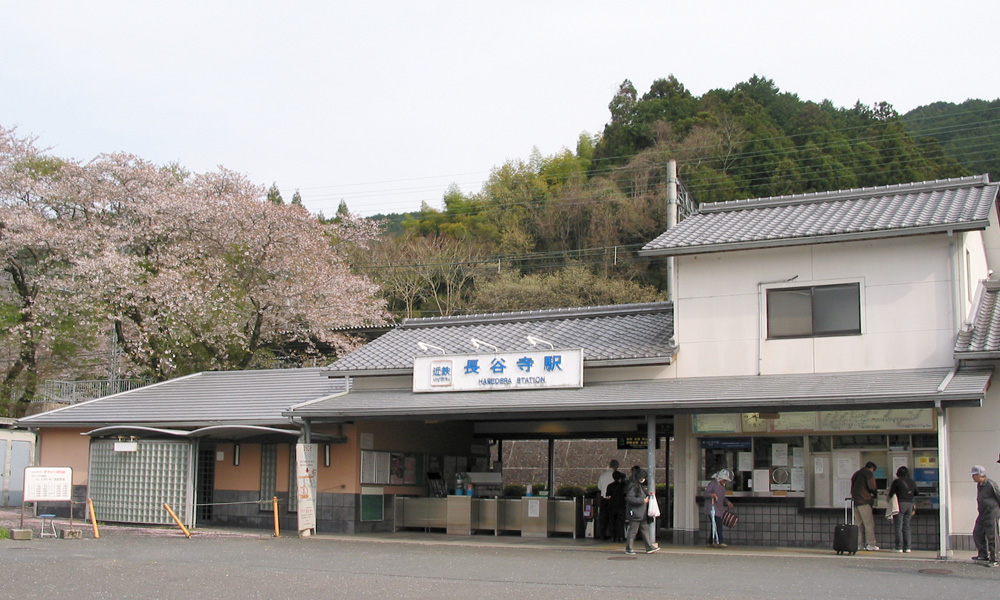
- Hasedera Station in April 2008

General information
- Location: 2499 Hatsue, Sakurai-shi, Nara-ken 633-0112; Japan
- Coordinates: 34.5271°N 135.9066°E
- System: Kintetsu Railway commuter rail station
- Operator: Kintetsu Railway
- Line: Osaka Line
- Distance: 45.6 km (28.3 miles) from Ōsaka Uehommachi
- Platforms: 2 side platforms
- Tracks: 2
- Train operators: Kintetsu Railway

Other information
- Status: Unattended
- Station code: D44
- Website: Official website

History
- Opened: 27 October 1929

Passengers
- 2019: 585 daily

Services
Preceding station	Kintetsu Railway	Following station
Yamato-Asakura towards Osaka Uehommachi	Osaka Line Local Suburban Semi-Express Semi-Express Express	Haibara towards Ise-Nakagawa
Location
- Location within Nara Prefecture Location within Japan

Hasedera Station (長谷寺駅, Hasedera-eki) is a passenger railway station located in the city of Sakurai, Nara Prefecture, Japan. It is operated by the private transportation company, Kintetsu Railway.

== Line ==
Hasedera Station is served by the Osaka Line and is 45.6 kilometers from the starting point of the line at Ōsaka Uehommachi.

== Layout ==
The station is an above-ground station has two opposing side platforms with two tracks. The effective length of the platform is six cars. As it is on a slope, the station building on the north side of the outbound tracks is about one floor lower than the platforms, and each platform is connected by stairs. There is only one ticket gate. As it is located higher than the surrounding area, it also looks like an elevated station built on an embankment. There are also sidings and the remains of an unused platform on the north side of the outbound tracks. The station is unattended.

=== Platforms ===
1	■ Osaka Line	for Nabari, Ise-Nakagawa, Kashikojima and Nagoya
2	■ Osaka Line	for Yamato-Yagi, Osaka Uehonmachi and Osaka Namba

== History ==
Hasedera Station opened on 27 October 1929 on the Sangu Express Railway. On 15 March 1941, the line merged with the Osaka Electric Tramway Sakurai Lineand became the Kansai Express Railway's Osaka Line. This line was merged with the Nankai Electric Railway on 1 June 1944 to form Kintetsu.

== Passenger statistics ==
In fiscal 2019, the station was used by an average of 585 passengers daily (boarding passengers only).

== Surrounding area ==
- Hase-dera
- Sakurai Municipal Hatsuse Elementary School
- Sakurai Municipal Sakurai Higashi Junior High School

== See also ==
- List of railway stations in Japan
