= Haibara Station =

Railway station in Uda, Nara Prefecture, Japan

Haibara Station 榛原駅
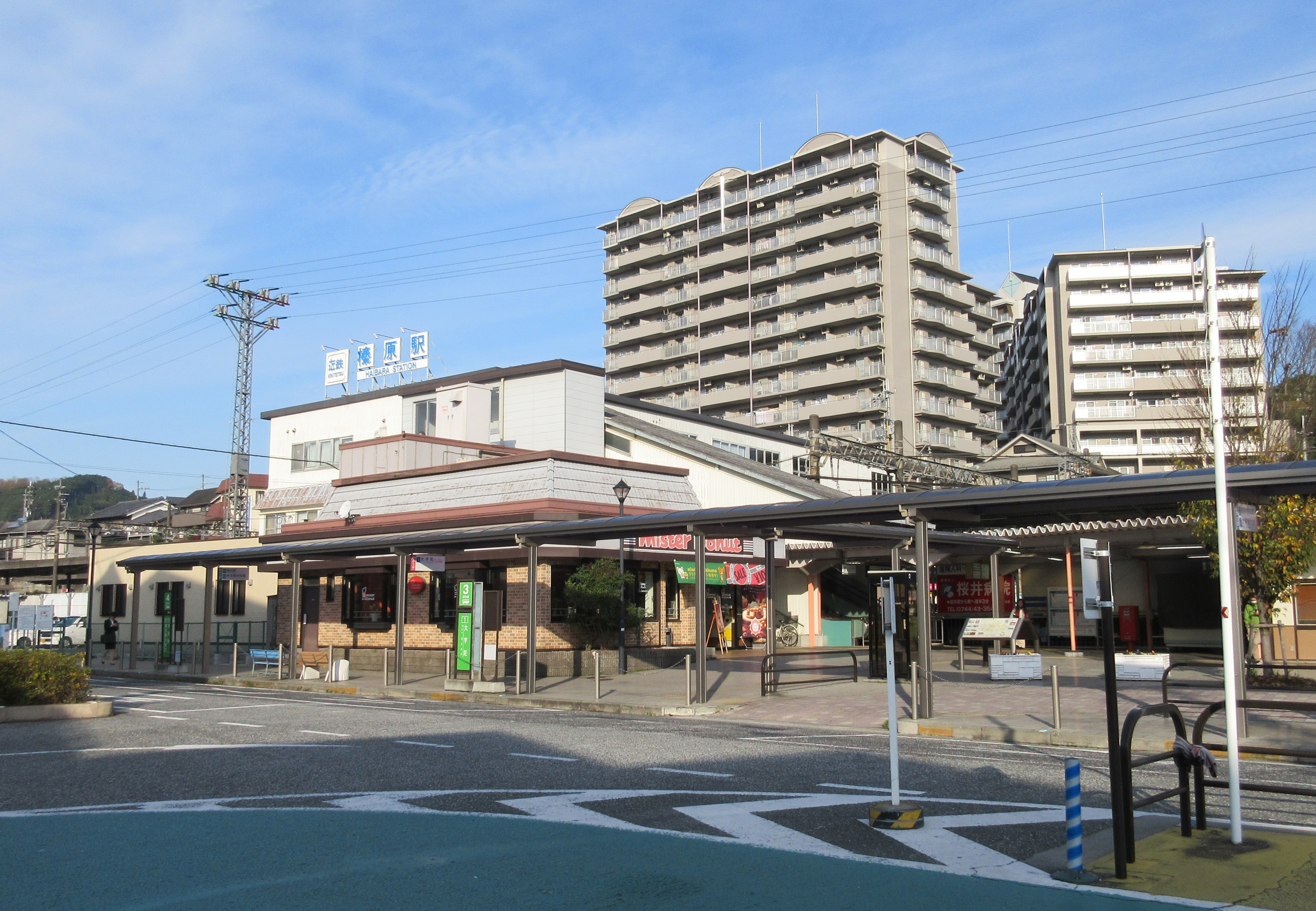
- Haibara Station south entrance in 2015

General information
- Location: 2426, Hagiwara, Haibara, Uda-shi, Nara-ken 633-0253; Japan
- Coordinates: 34°31′48″N 135°57′17″E
- Operator: Kintetsu Railway
- Line: D Osaka Line
- Distance: 50.1 km from Osaka-Uehommachi
- Platforms: 2 island + 1 side platforms
- Tracks: 5
- Connections: Bus terminal

Construction
- Structure type: elevated

Other information
- Station code: D45
- Website: Official website

History
- Opened: 21 February 1930

Passengers
- FY2019: 4673 daily

Services
| Preceding station | Kintetsu Railway | Following station |
|---|---|---|
| Hasedera towards Osaka Uehommachi | Osaka Line Local Semi-Express Express | Murōguchi-Ōno towards Ise-Nakagawa |
| Sakurai towards Osaka Uehommachi | Osaka Line Rapid Express | Murōguchi-Ōno towards Ise-Nakagawa |
Location
- Location within Nara Prefecture Location within Japan

Haibara Station (榛原駅, Haibara-eki) is a passenger railway station located in the city of Uda, Nara Prefecture, Japan. It is operated by the private transportation company, Kintetsu Railway.

== Line ==
Haibara Station is served by the Osaka Line and is 50.1 kilometers from the starting point of the line at Osaka-Uehommachi.

== Layout ==
The station has two island platforms and one side platform connected by an elevated station building. The two inside tracks (tracks 2 and 3) are the main tracks, while the two outside tracks (tracks 1 and 4) are sidings. Platform 5 is a dead-end turnaround track on the Nabari side.

=== Platforms ===
| 5 | ■ Osaka Line | for Osaka Uehommachi and Osaka-Namba |
| 1, 2 | ■ Osaka Line | for Nabari, Isuzugawa and Kashikojima |
| 3, 4 | ■ Osaka Line | for Osaka Uehommachi and Osaka-Namba |

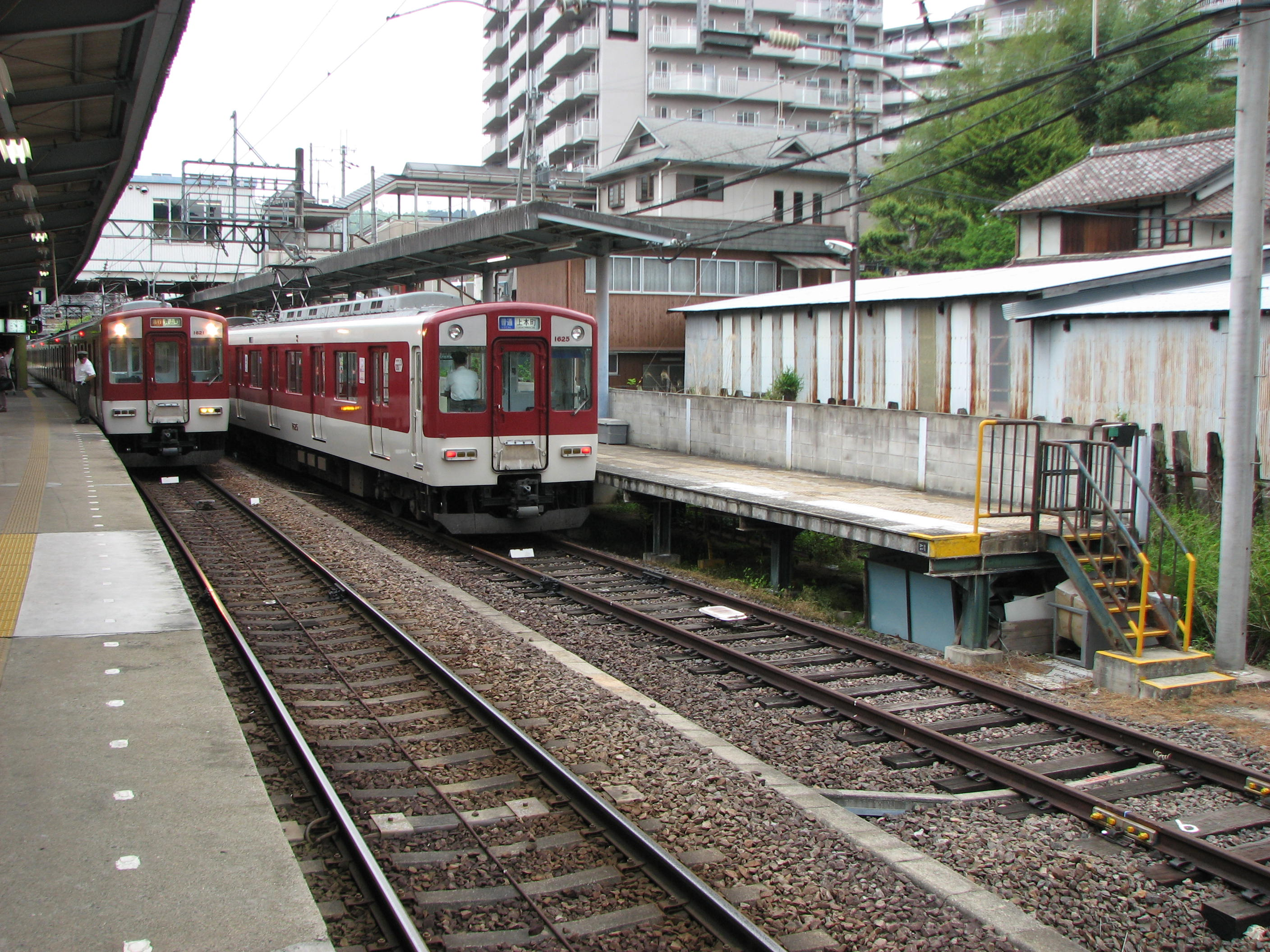
Platform 5 from Platform 1

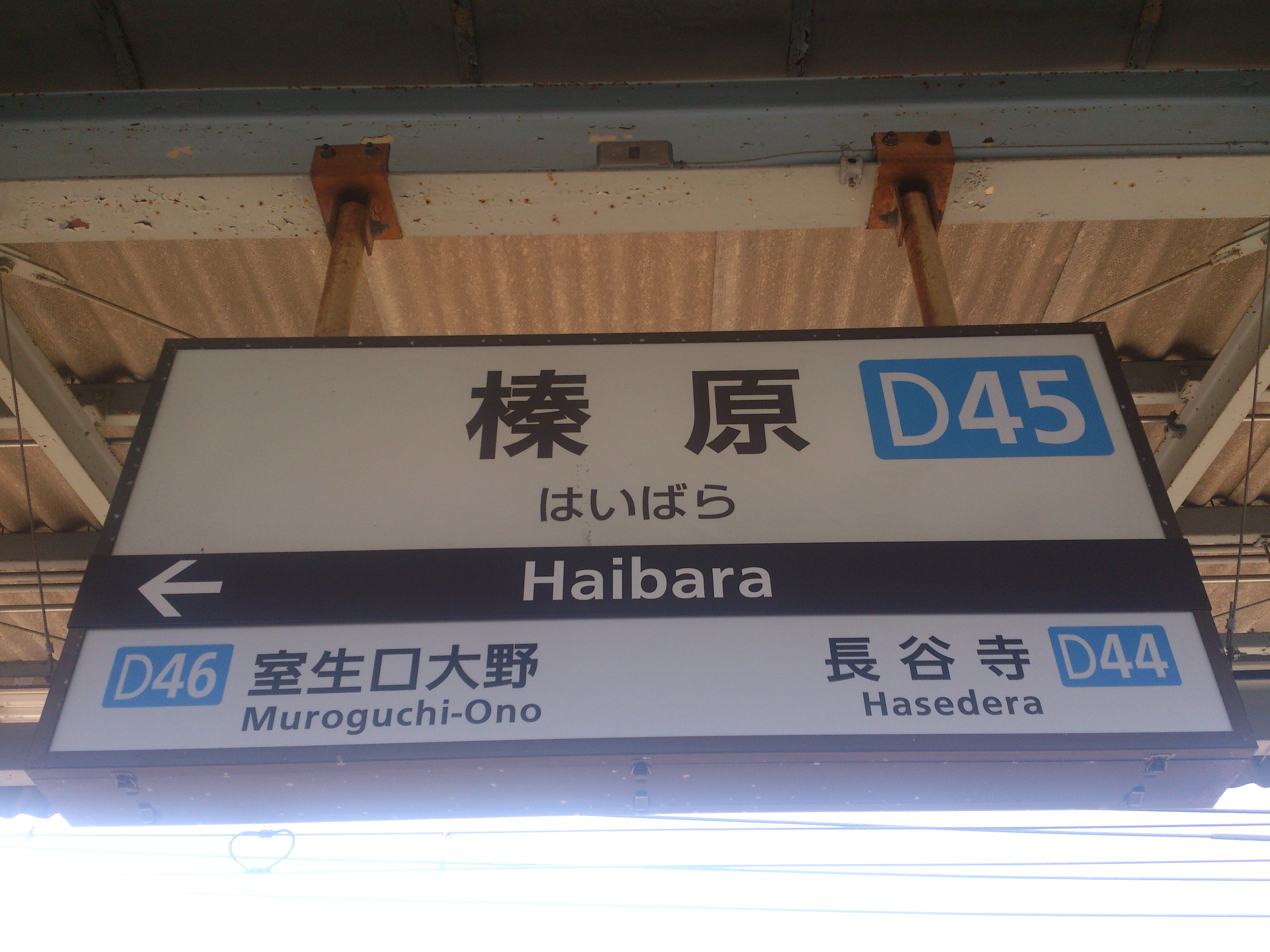
Signage

== History ==
Haibara Station opened on 21 February 1930 on the Sangu Express Railway. On 15 March 1941, the line merged with the Osaka Electric Tramway and became the Kansai Express Railway's Osaka Line. This line was merged with the Nankai Electric Railway on 1 June 1944 to form Kintetsu.

== Passenger statistics ==
In fiscal 2019, the station was used by an average of 4673 passengers daily (boarding passengers only).

== Surrounding area ==
- Uda City Hall
- Uda City Central Library
- Uda City Hospital
- Nara Prefectural Fire Academy
- Nara Prefectural Haruhiyo High School

== See also ==
- List of railway stations in Japan
