= Natsuki =

- Pronunciation: Nat-ski

Origin
- Origin: Japanese
- Meaning: Different meanings depending on the kanji used
- Region of origin: Japan

Other names
- Related names: Natsuko; Natsumi

Natsuki (なつき, ナツキ) is a common Japanese given name. While it is a unisex name, it is more predominantly used by women. It can also be used as a surname.

== Written forms ==
Natsuki can be written using different kanji characters and can mean:

as a given name

- 夏稀, "summer, rare"
- 夏生, "summer, life"
- 夏紀, "summer, chronicle"
- 夏樹, "summer, wood"
- 夏姫, "summer, princess"
- 夏希, "summer, hope"
- 菜月, "greens, moon"
- 菜月, "Rapeseed flower, moon"
- 那月, "rich/beautiful, moon"
- 夏妃, "summer, queen"
- 夏季, "summer, seasons"
- 懐季, "reminiscence, yearn, seasons"
- 懐希, "reminiscence, yearn, hope"
- ナツキ, katakana for "Natsuki"
- なつき, hiragana for "Natsuki"

as a surname

- 夏木, "summer, tree"
- 夏樹, "summer, wood"

== People ==
=== Given name ===
- Natsuki Aizawa (相澤 菜月, born 1999), Japanese female handball player
- Natsuki Deguchi (出口 夏希, born 2001), Japanese actress and model
- Natsuki Fukase (深瀬 菜月, born 1994), Japanese group rhythmic gymnast
- Natsuki Hanae (花江 夏樹, born 1991), Japanese voice actor and singer
- Natsuki Harada (原田 夏希, born 1984), a Japanese actress
- Natsuki Ikeda (池田 夏希, born 1987), Japanese female tarento and actress
- Natsuki Ikezawa (池澤 夏樹, born 1945), Japanese poet, novelist, essayist, and translator
- Natsuki Kamata (鎌田 菜月, born 1996), Japanese idol and member of the all-female Japanese group SKE48
- Natsuki Katō (加藤 夏希, born 1985), Japanese actress
- Natsuki Kishikawa (岸川 奈津希, born 1991), Japanese professional footballer
- Natsuki Koyata (古谷田 奈月, born 1981), Japanese writer
- Natsuki Mizu (水 夏希, born 1972), a Japanese musical actress who was a member of the all-female musical troupe, Takarazuka Revue from 2006 to 2010
- Natsuki Morikawa (森川 七月, born 1985), Japanese jazz singer
- Natsuki Mugikura (麦倉 捺木, born 1996), Japanese football player
- Natsuki Naito (born 1991) Japanese field hockey player
- Natsuki Nidaira (仁平 菜月, born 1998), Japanese badminton player
- Natsuki Nishi (born 1972), Japanese Olympic sprint canoer
- Natsuki Obama (小濱 なつき, born 1984), Japanese fashion model and actor
- Natsuki Oie (大家 夏稀, born 1998), Japanese badminton player
- Natsuki Okamoto (岡本 奈月, born 1989), a Japanese fashion model and actress
- Natsuki Okamoto (television personality) (岡本 夏生, born 1965) Japanese tarento, race queen and gravure idol
- Natsuki Ozawa (小沢 なつき, born 1972), Japanese singer, actress, and pornographic actress
- Natsuki Sato (佐藤 夏希, born 1990), J-pop singer and former member of the all-female Japanese group AKB48
- Natsuki Suizu (水津 菜月, born 2004), Japanese idol and member of the all-female Japanese group NGT48
- Natsuki Sumeragi (皇 名月 or 皇 なつき, born 1967), Japanese illustrator and manga artist who is famous for incorporating both Korean and Chinese history into her works
- Natsuki Taiyo (夏樹 たいよう, born 1984), Japanese retired professional wrestler
- Natsuki Takatsuka (髙塚 夏生, born 2000), Japanese idol and former member of the all-female Japanese group SKE48
- Natsuki Takaya (高屋 奈月, born 1973), Japanese manga artist best known for creating the manga series, Fruits Basket
- Natsuki Takeuchi (武内 夏暉, born 2001), Japanese professional baseball pitcher
- Natsuki Taki (滝 菜月, born 1993) Japanese announcer
- Natsuki Tanihara (たにはら なつき, August 18) Japanese manga artist
- Natsuki Tanii (谷井 菜月, born 2003) Japanese competition climber
- Natsuki Toda (戸田 懐生, born 2000) Japanese baseball player
- Natsuki Toda (athlete) (born 2004) Japanese para-athete
- Natsuki Uchiyama (内山 奈月, born 1995) Japanese copywriter and former idol
- Natsuki Wada (和田 なつき, born 2003) Japanese para table tennis player

=== Surname ===
- Jaimie Natsuki (ジェイミー 夏樹, born 1992), Japanese actress and tarento
- Mari Natsuki (中島 淳子, born 1952), Japanese singer, dancer and actress
- Rio Natsuki (夏樹 リオ, born 1969), Japanese voice actress
- Yōko Natsuki (夏樹 陽子, born 1952), Japanese actress
- Yosuke Natsuki (夏木 陽介, 1936–2018), Japanese actor

== Fictional characters ==
=== Given name ===
- Natsuki, a character from the manga Bad Company
- Natsuki, a character from the visual novel game Doki Doki Literature Club!
- Natsuki Kisumi, the title character of Natsuki Crisis, a Japanese manga and 2 episode OVA
- Natsuki Kuga (なつき), a character from the anime series My-HiME
- Natsuki Kruger (ナツキ), a character from the anime series My-Otome
- Natsuki Mamiya (菜月), a main character from the 2006 Japanese tokusatsu series, GoGo Sentai Boukenger
- Natsuki Nakagawa (中川 夏紀), a character from the anime Sound! Euphonium
- Natsuki Shinohara, a character from the animated movie Summer Wars
- Natsuki Shinomiya (那月), a character from the otome game series Uta no Prince-sama
- Natsuki Smith-Mizuki, a character from the manga Shonan Junai Gumi

=== Surname ===
- Musashi Natsuki (夏木六三四), the title character of Musashi no Ken
- Rin Natsuki (夏木りん, a.k.a Cure Rouge), a character from the anime Yes! Pretty Cure 5
  - Ai and Yu Natsuki, Rin's younger siblings
  - Kazuyo Natsuki, Rin, Ai, and Yu's mother
- Subaru Natsuki, protagonist of the light novel series Re:Zero − Starting Life in Another World
