= Sambommatsu Station =

Sambommatsu Station (三本松駅) is the name of two train stations in Japan:

- Sambommatsu Station (Kagawa)
- Sambommatsu Station (Nara)
