= Murōguchi-Ōno Station =

Railway station in Uda, Nara Prefecture, Japan

Murōguchi-Ōno Station 室生口大野駅
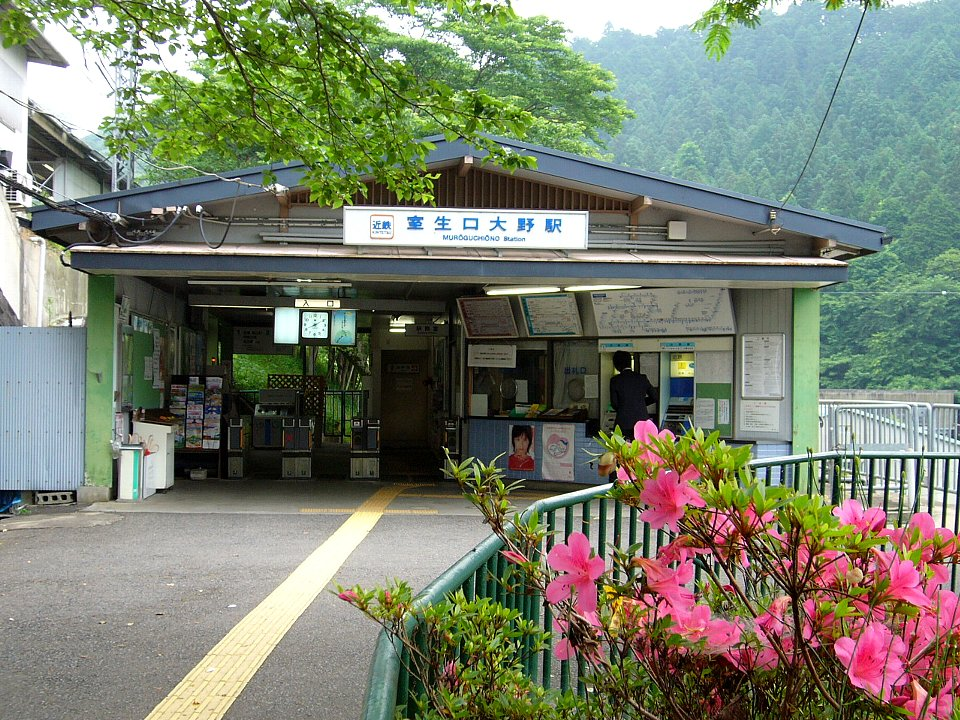
- Murōguchi-Ōno Station

General information
- Location: 1756, Ōno, Murō, Uda-shi, Nara-ken 633-0315; Japan
- Coordinates: 34°33′59″N 136°00′56″E
- Operator: Kintetsu Railway
- Line: D Osaka Line
- Distance: 57.2 km from Osaka-Uehommachi
- Platforms: 2 side platforms
- Tracks: 2
- Connections: Bus stop

Other information
- Station code: D46
- Website: Official website

History
- Opened: 10 October 1930

Passengers
- FY2019: 464 daily

Services
Preceding station	Kintetsu Railway	Following station
Haibara towards Osaka Uehommachi	Osaka Line Local Semi-Express Express	Sambommatsu towards Ise-Nakagawa
Haibara towards Osaka Uehommachi	Osaka Line Rapid Express	Akameguchi towards Ise-Nakagawa
Location
- Location within Nara Prefecture Location within Japan

Murōguchi-Ōno Station (室生口大野駅, Murōguchi-Ōno-eki) is a passenger railway station located in the city of Uda, Nara Prefecture, Japan. It is operated by the private transportation company, Kintetsu Railway.

== Line ==
Murōguchi-Ōno Station is served by the Osaka Line and is 57.2 kilometers from the starting point of the line at Osaka-Uehommachi.

== Layout ==
The station is an above-ground station with two opposing side platforms and two tracks. Because it is on an embankment, the station building on the south side of the up line is one floor lower than the platforms, and each platform is connected by stairs. There is only one ticket gate. The effective length of the platform is 10 cars. The station is unattended.

=== Platforms ===
1	■ Osaka Line	for Nabari, Ise-Nakagawa, Kashikojima and Nagoya
2	■ Osaka Line	for Yamato-Yagi and Osaka Uehommachi

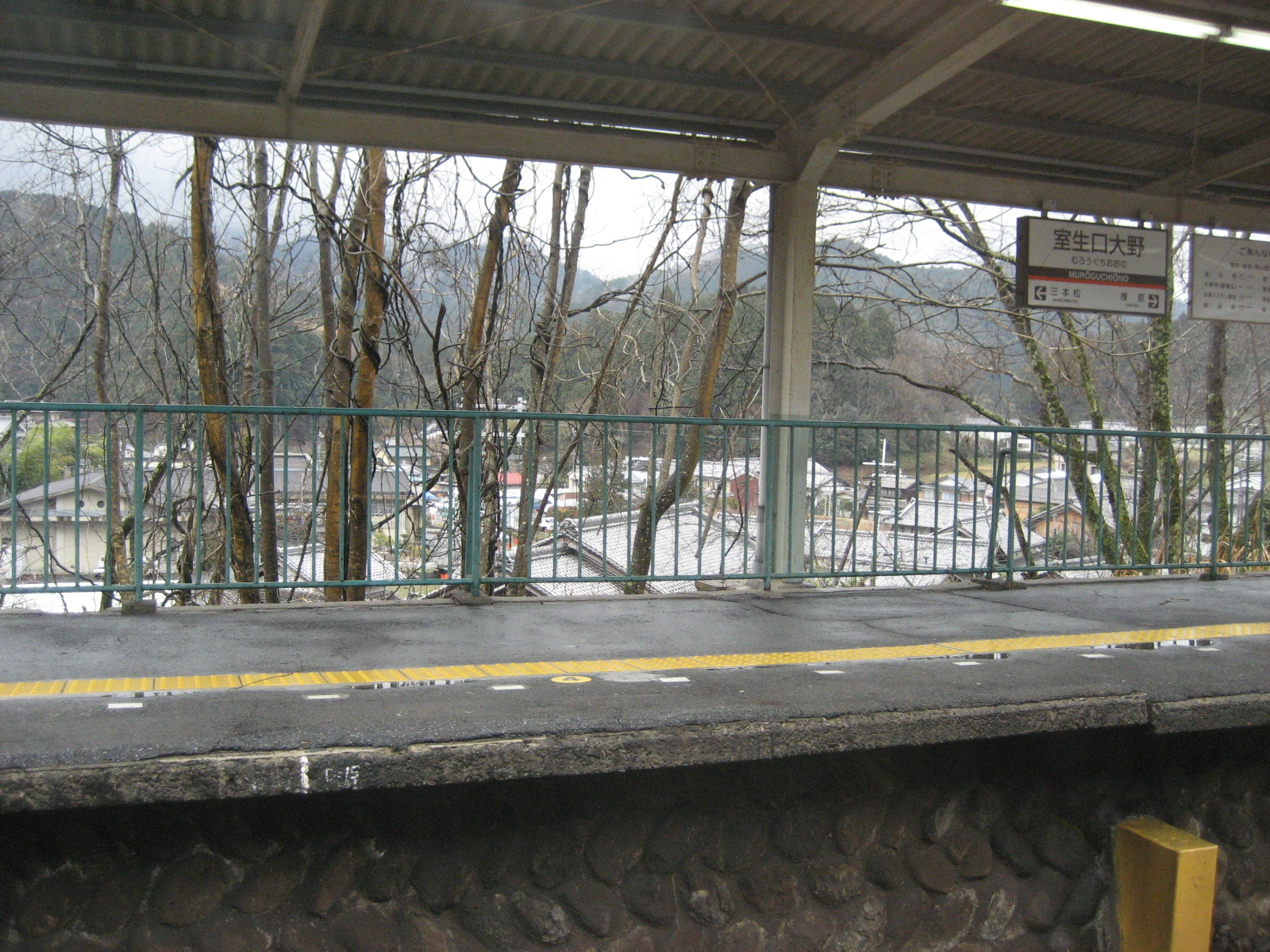
Platform

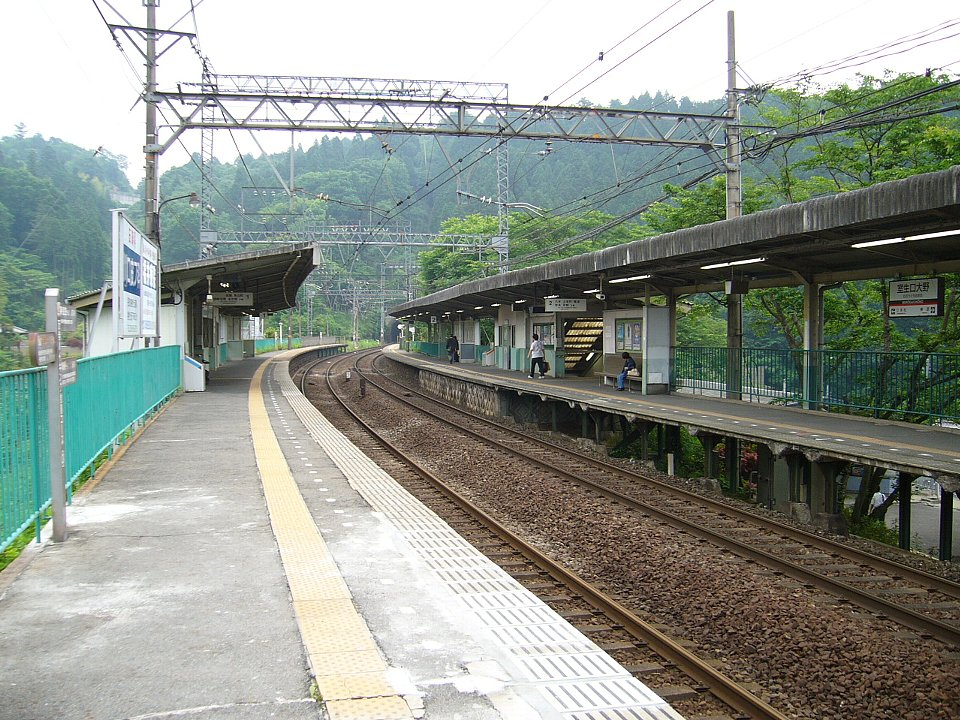
Platform

== History ==
Murōguchi-Ōno Station opened on 10 October 1930 on the Sangu Express Railway. On 15 March 1941, the line merged with the Osaka Electric Tramway and became the Kansai Express Railway's Osaka Line. This line was merged with the Nankai Electric Railway on 1 June 1944 to form Kintetsu.

== Passenger statistics ==
In fiscal 2019, the station was used by an average of 464 passengers daily (boarding passengers only).

== Surrounding area ==
- Uda City Hall Muro Regional Office (formerly Muro Village Hall)
- Ōno-ji (Carved Buddha)
- Japan National Route 165

== See also ==
- List of railway stations in Japan
