= Akameguchi Station =

Railway station in Nabari, Mie Prefecture, Japan

Akameguchi Station 赤目口駅
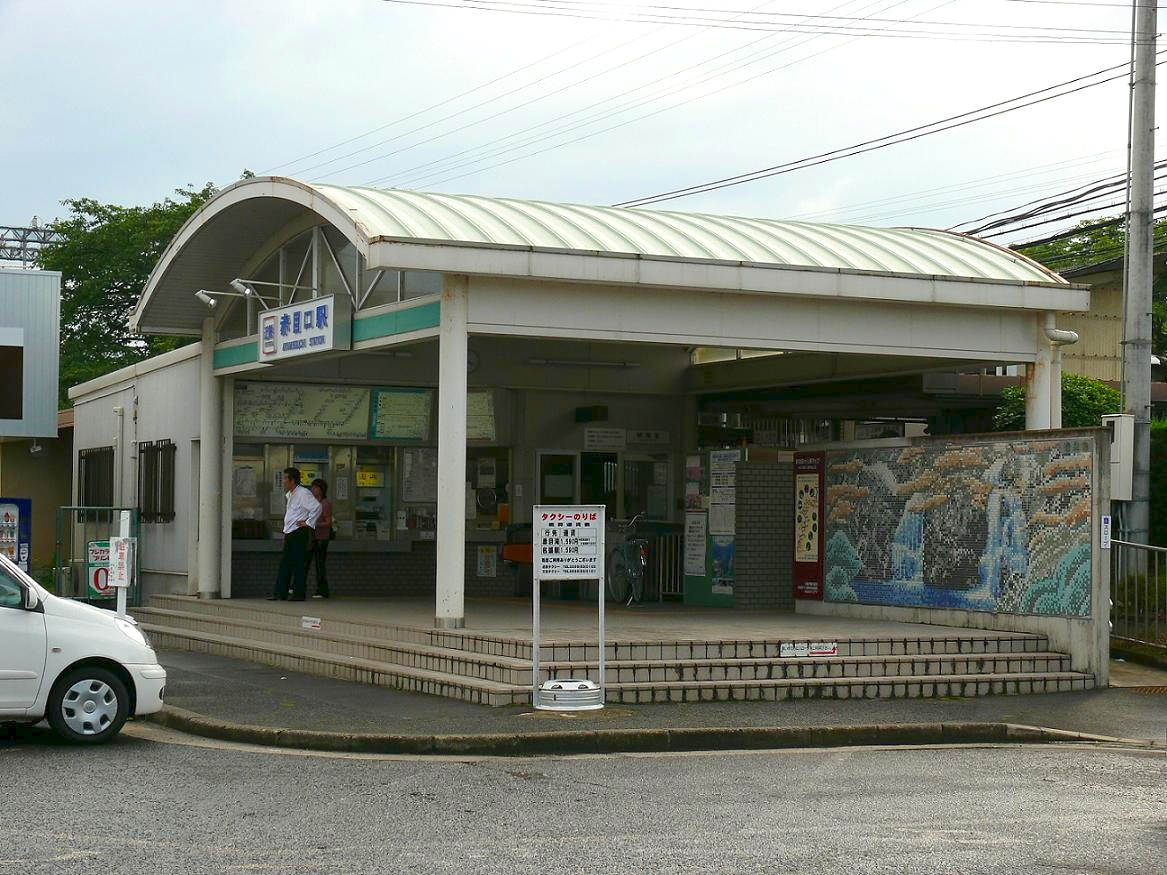
- Akameguchi Station

General information
- Location: 257-1 Joroku Akame-cho, Nabari-shi, Mie-ken 518-0465; Japan
- Coordinates: 34°35′59″N 136°04′29″E
- Operator: Kintetsu Railway
- Line: Osaka Line
- Distance: 64.0 km from Ōsaka Uehommachi
- Platforms: 2 side platforms

Other information
- Station code: D48
- Website: Official website

History
- Opened: October 10, 1930

Passengers
- FY2019: 569 daily
Location
- Location within Mie Prefecture Location within Japan

Akameguchi Station (赤目口駅, Akameguchi-eki) is a passenger railway station in located in the city of Nabari, Mie Prefecture, Japan, operated by the private railway operator Kintetsu Railway.

== Lines ==
Akameguchi Station is served by the Osaka Line, and is located 64.0 rail kilometers from the starting point of the line at Ōsaka Uehommachi Station.

== Station layout ==
Akameguchi Station has two opposed side platforms connected by an underground passage.

=== Platforms ===
1	■ Osaka Line	for Nabari, Ise-Nakagawa, Kashikojima and Nagoya
2	■ Osaka Line	for Yamato-Yagi and Ōsaka Uehommachi

== Adjacent stations ==
«	Service	»
Osaka Line
Sambommatsu	Local	Nabari
Sambommatsu	Semi-Express; Suburban Semi-Express	Nabari
Sambommatsu	Express	Nabari
Murōguchi-Ōno	Rapid Express	Nabari

== History ==
Akameguchi Station opened on October 10, 1930, as a station on the Sangu Express Electric Railway. After merging with Osaka Electric Kido on March 15, 1941, the line became the Kansai Express Railway's Osaka Line. This line was merged with the Nankai Electric Railway on June 1, 1944, to form Kintetsu.

== Passenger statistics ==
In fiscal 2019, the station was used by an average of 569 passengers daily (boarding passengers only).

== Surrounding area ==
- Nabari City Kinsei Akame Elementary School

== See also ==
- List of railway stations in Japan
