= Natsumi temple ruins =

Buddhist temple in Nabari, Japan

- 夏見廃寺跡 (Japanese)
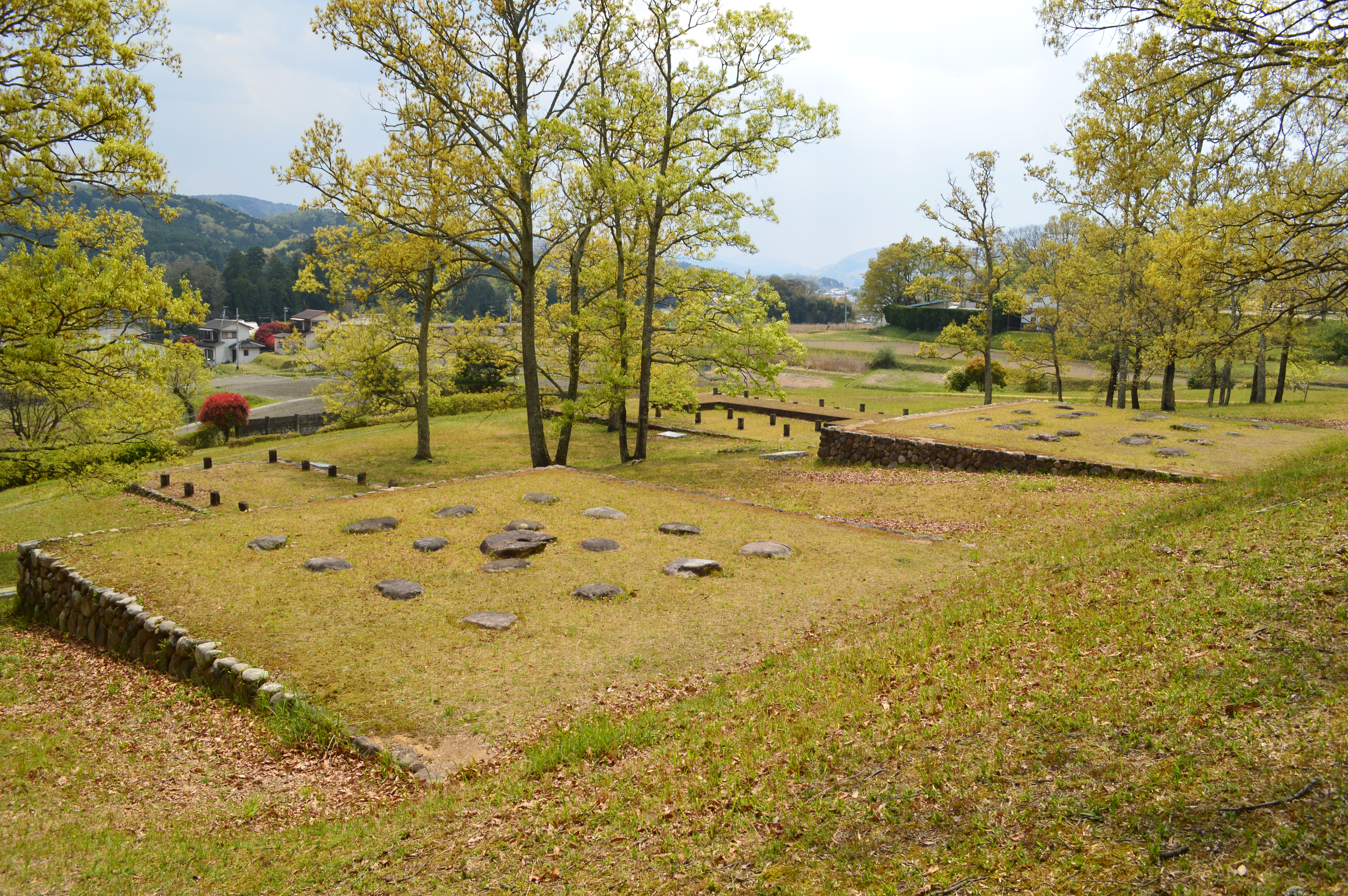
- The remains of the Pagoda on the left, Kondō on the far right, the priest's residence on the far left and the remains of the lecture hall at the back

- Natsumi temple ruins Natsumi temple ruins (Japan)
- 34°37′19″N 136°6′40.8″E
- Type: temple ruins
- Periods: Asuka period
- Location: Nabari, Mie, Japan
- Region: Kansai region

Site notes
- Public access: Yes (museum, park)

The Natsumi temple ruins (夏見廃寺跡, Natsumi haji ato) is an archaeological site with the ruins of an Asuka to Nara period Buddhist temple located in the Natsumi neighborhood of the city of Nabari, Mie Prefecture, Japan. The temple no longer exists, but the temple grounds were designated as a National Historic Site in 1990.

== Overview ==
The Natsumi temple ruins are located on the southern slope of Otokoyama hill on the right bank of the Nabari River in the southern part of the Iga region of Mie. Numerous roof tiles were found in the area in 1937. Archaeological excavations were carried out in 1946-1947 and in 1984-1986 (Showa 59-61), uncovering the foundations of a Kondō, Pagoda and a Lecture Hall. it was estimated that the Kondō was built around the end of the 7th century during the Hakuho period, and the pagoda and Lecture Hall were built around the first half of the 8th century during the Nara period, and were burnt down around the end of the 10th century during the Heian period. From the location of the ruins and from descriptions in historical sources, such as the "Daigoji Hon Yakushiji Engi" (醍醐寺本薬師寺縁起), it is believed that the temple was known as Shofuku-ji (昌福寺), which was built by Princess Ōku for her father, Emperor Tenmu.

This theory is reinforced by the unusual arrangement of the buildings necessitated by the terrain, in which the Lecture Hall is located to the southwest of the Kondō, and also by the unusual design of the Kondō itself, with a frontage of three bays and depth of two bays. This design is only found elsewhere at the ruins of the contemporary Yamada-dera in Sakurai, Nara.

Princess Ōku was the first Saiō, or imperial priestess assigned by the court to the Ise Grand Shrines and Nabari was regarded as the eastern border of the Kinai region, or the core territory of the Yamato state. Princess Ōku performed a misogi ritual purification when crossing the Nabari River into Ise Province because of this. However, following the death of Prince Ōtsu in 686 AD, Princess Ōku lost her authority, and the temple was completed by Empress Genmei.

The ruins are located Nabari City Central Park, with the outlines of the foundations of the buildings preserved. In the adjacent Natsumi Temple Ruins Exhibition Hall (夏見廃寺展示館, Natsumi Haiji Tenjikan), many excavated items such as roof tiles and 516 fragments of Buddha images, along with replicas of Buddhist paintings reflecting Hakuho culture are on display. Many of the excavated items were collectively designated a Mie Prefecture Tangible Cultural Property in 2003. The site is located a seven-minute walk from the "Natsumi" but stop on the Mie Kotsu Bus from Nabari Station on the Kintetsu Osaka Line.

== Gallery ==
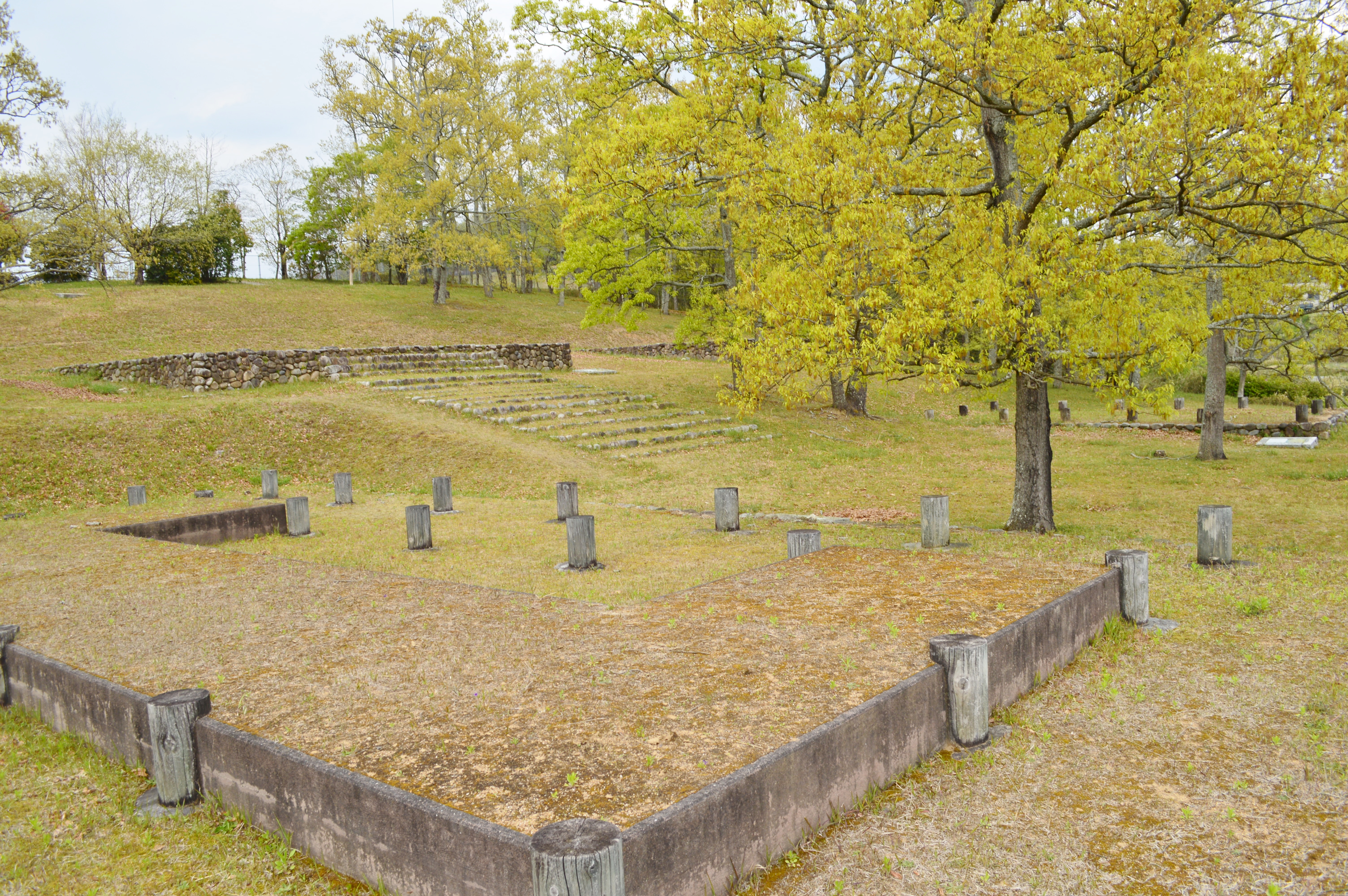
Panoramic view

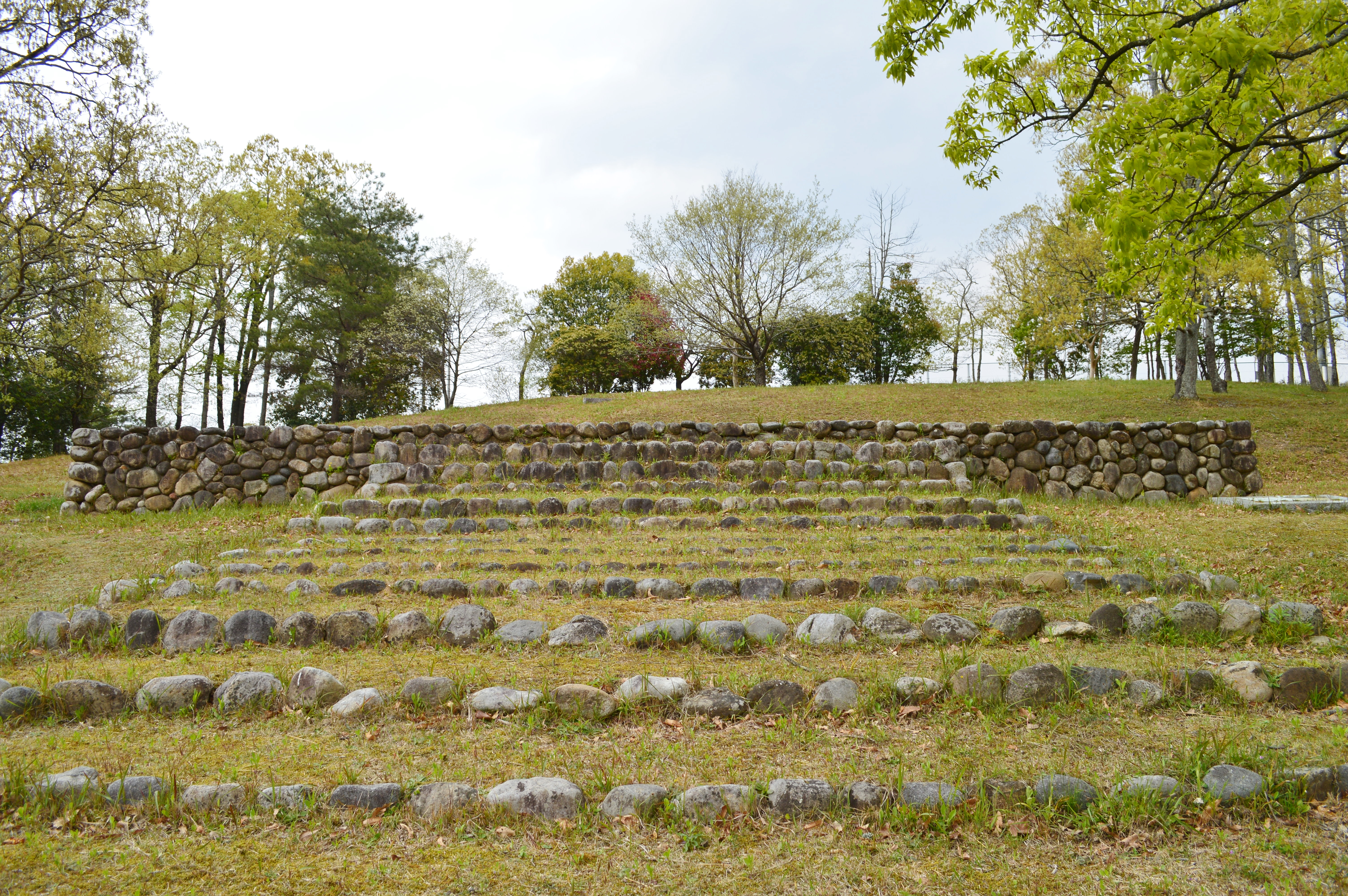
Site of Kondo

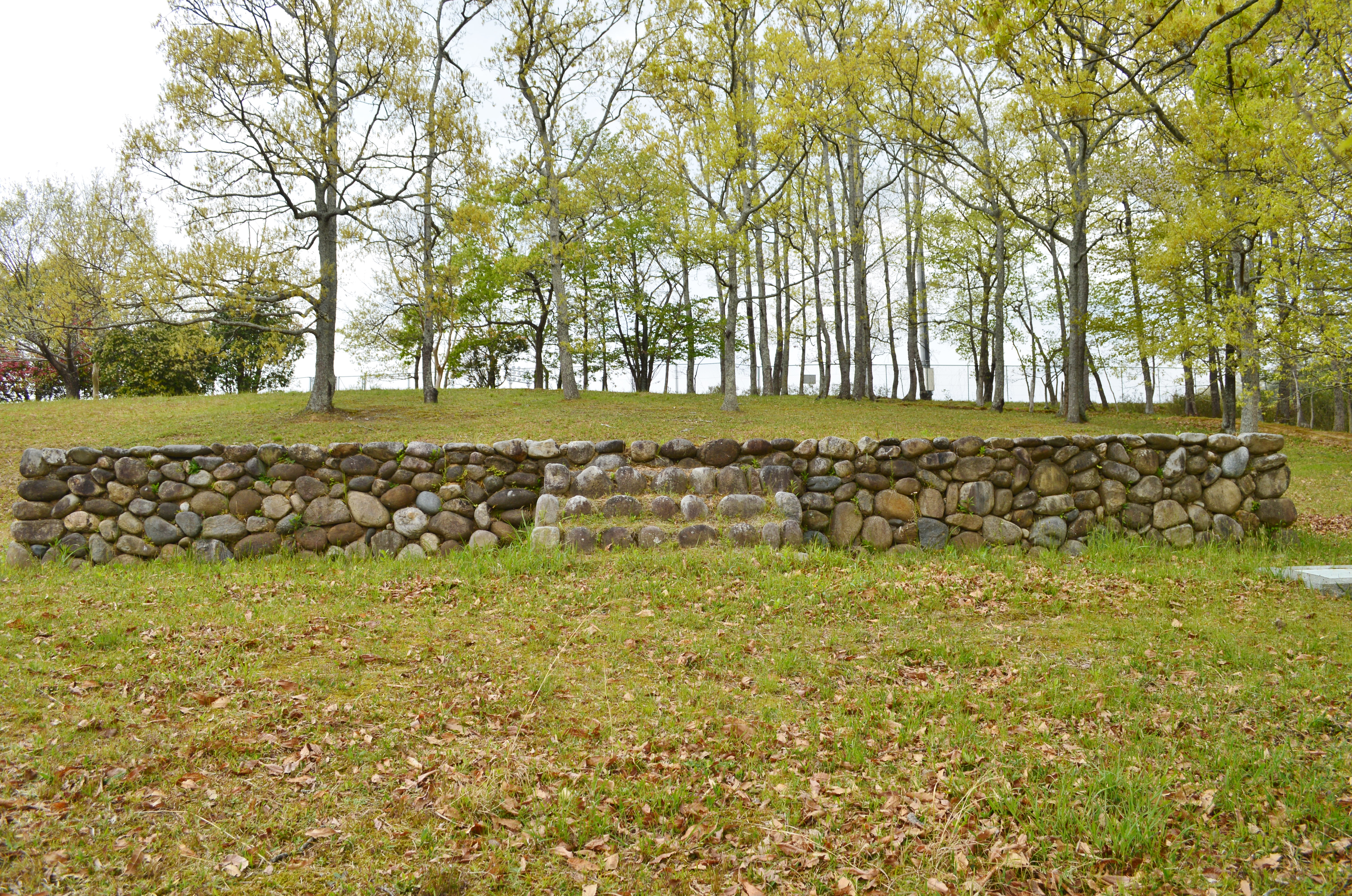
Site of Pagoda

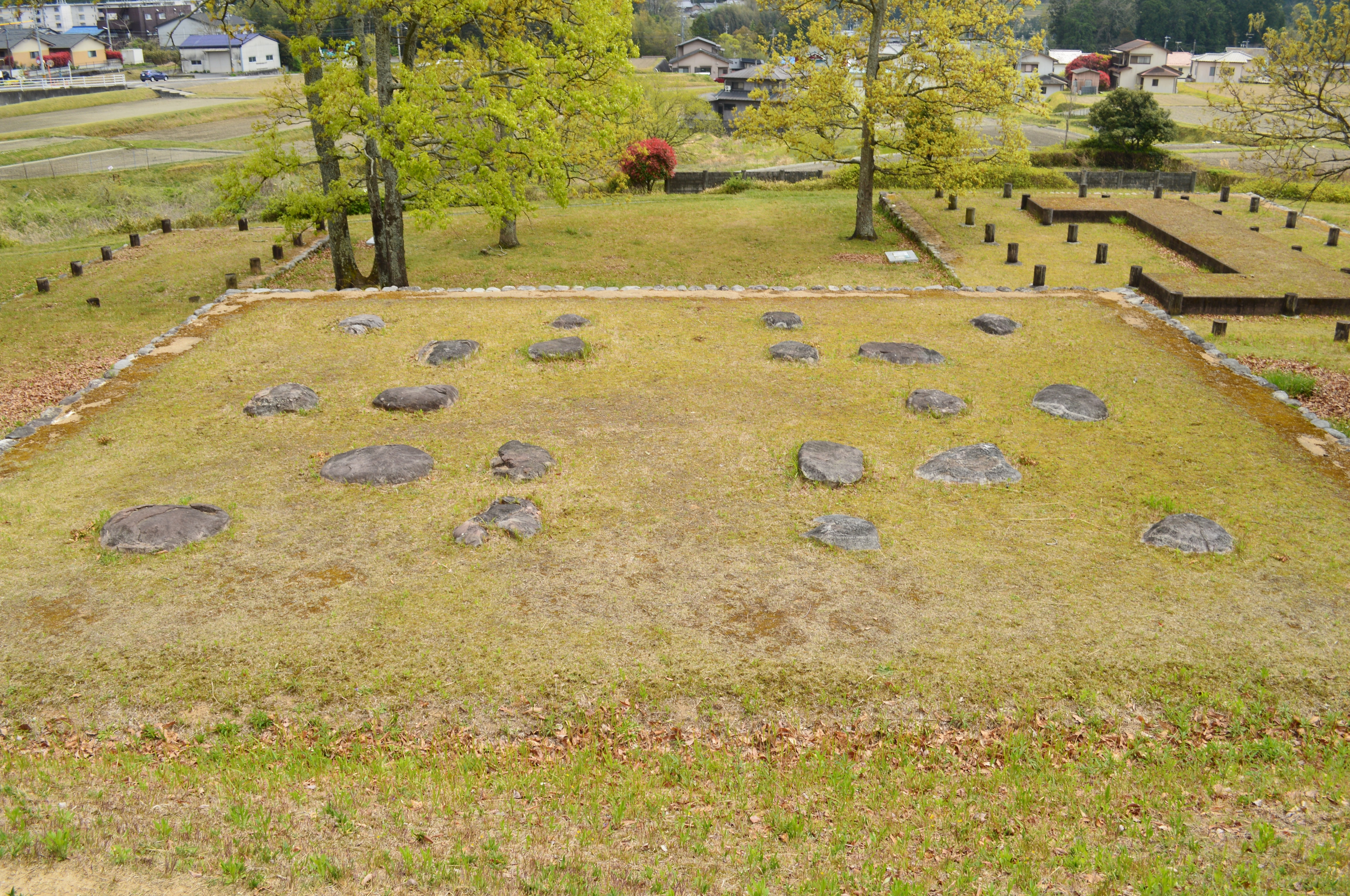
Foundations of Kondo

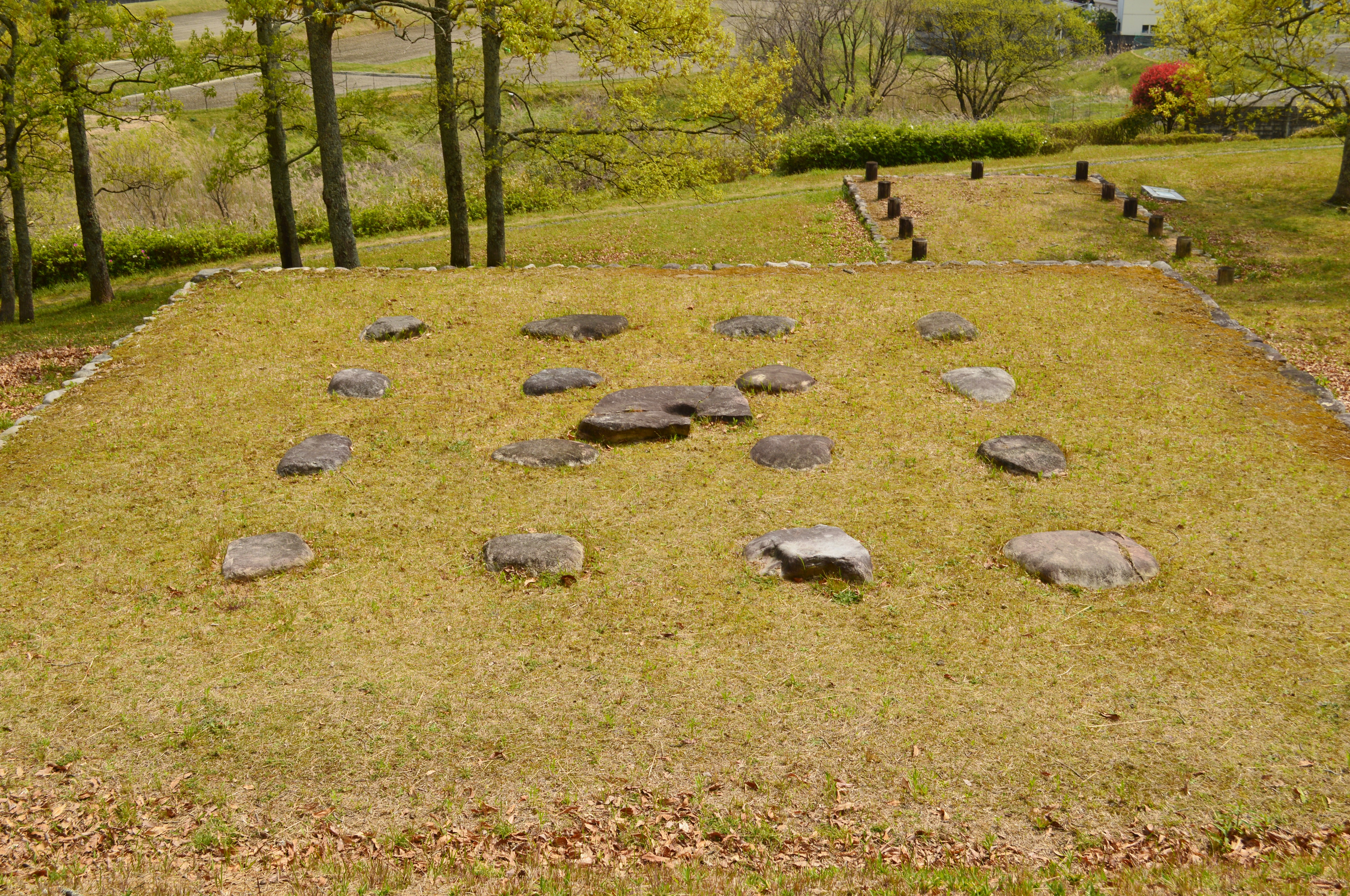
Foundations of Pagoda

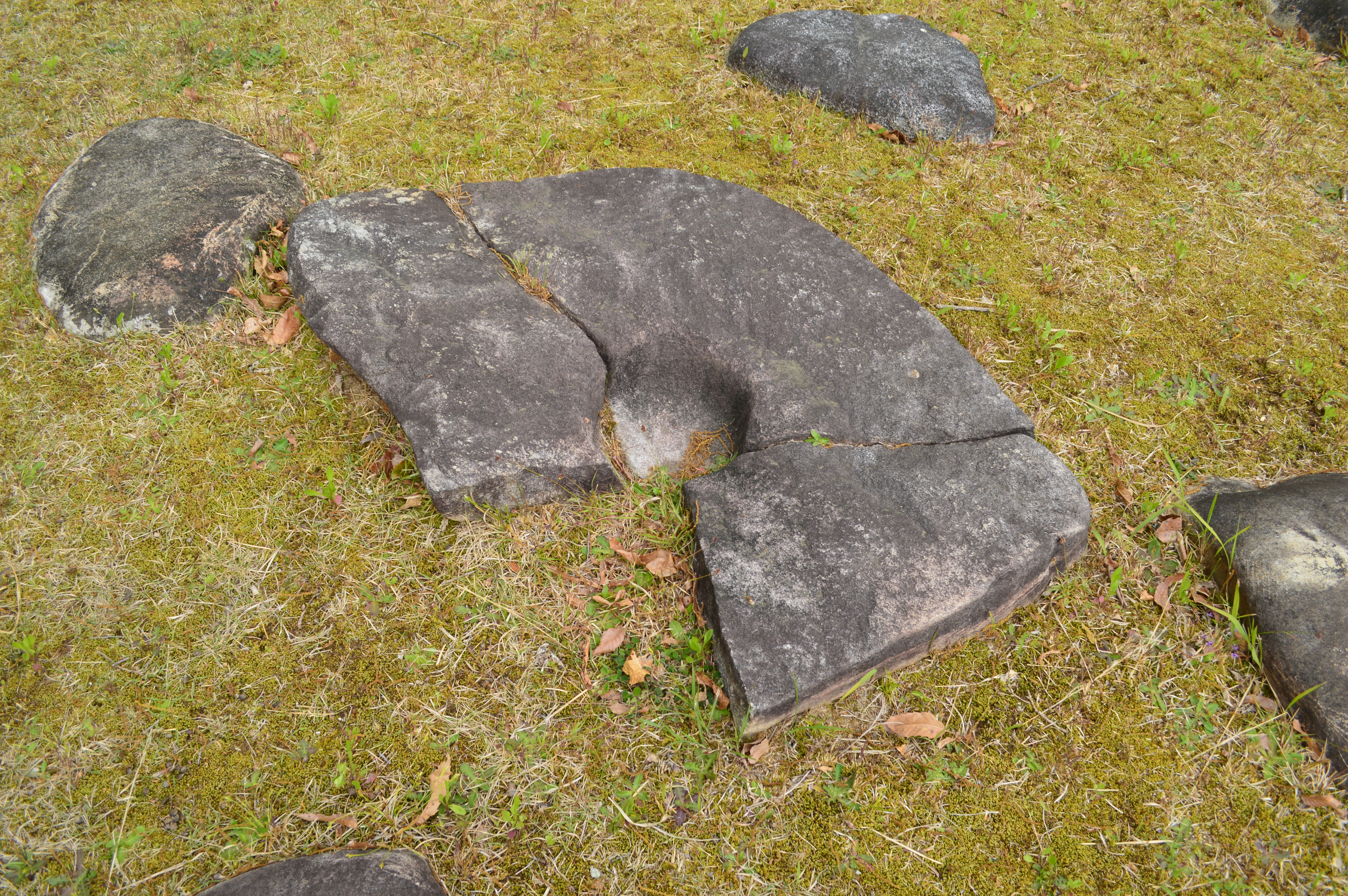
Central foundation of Pagoda

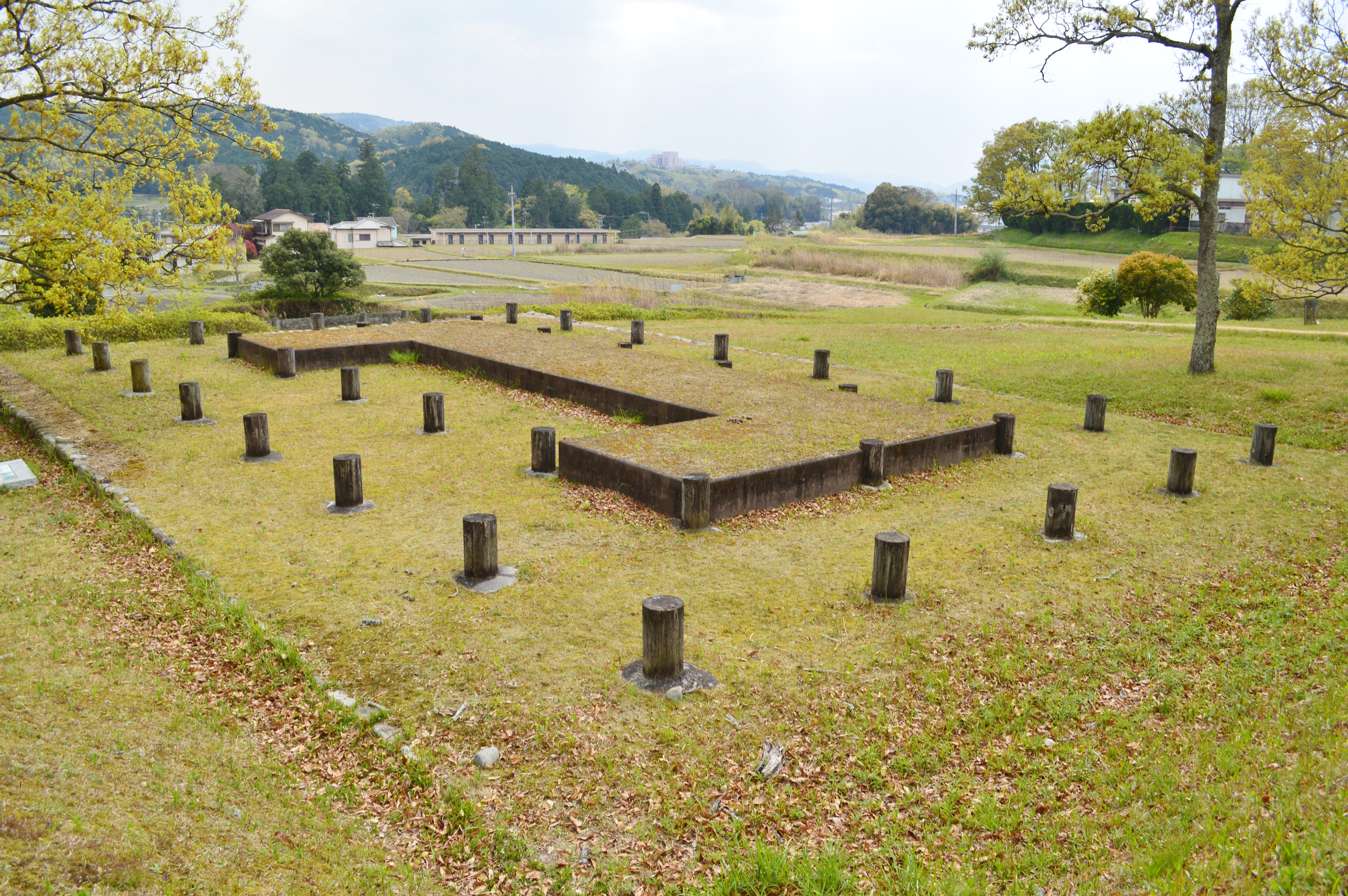
Site of Lecture Hall

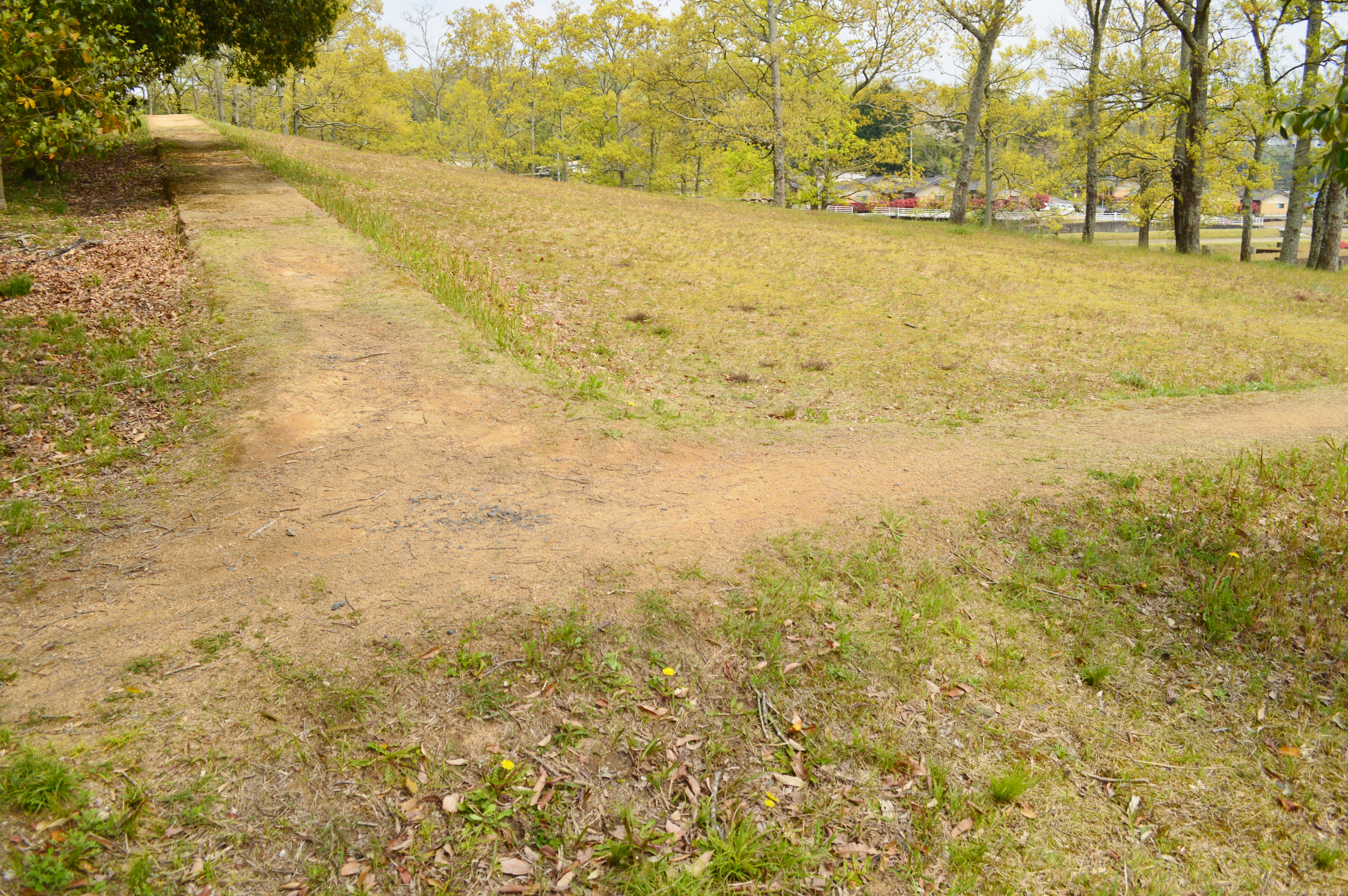
Traces of walls

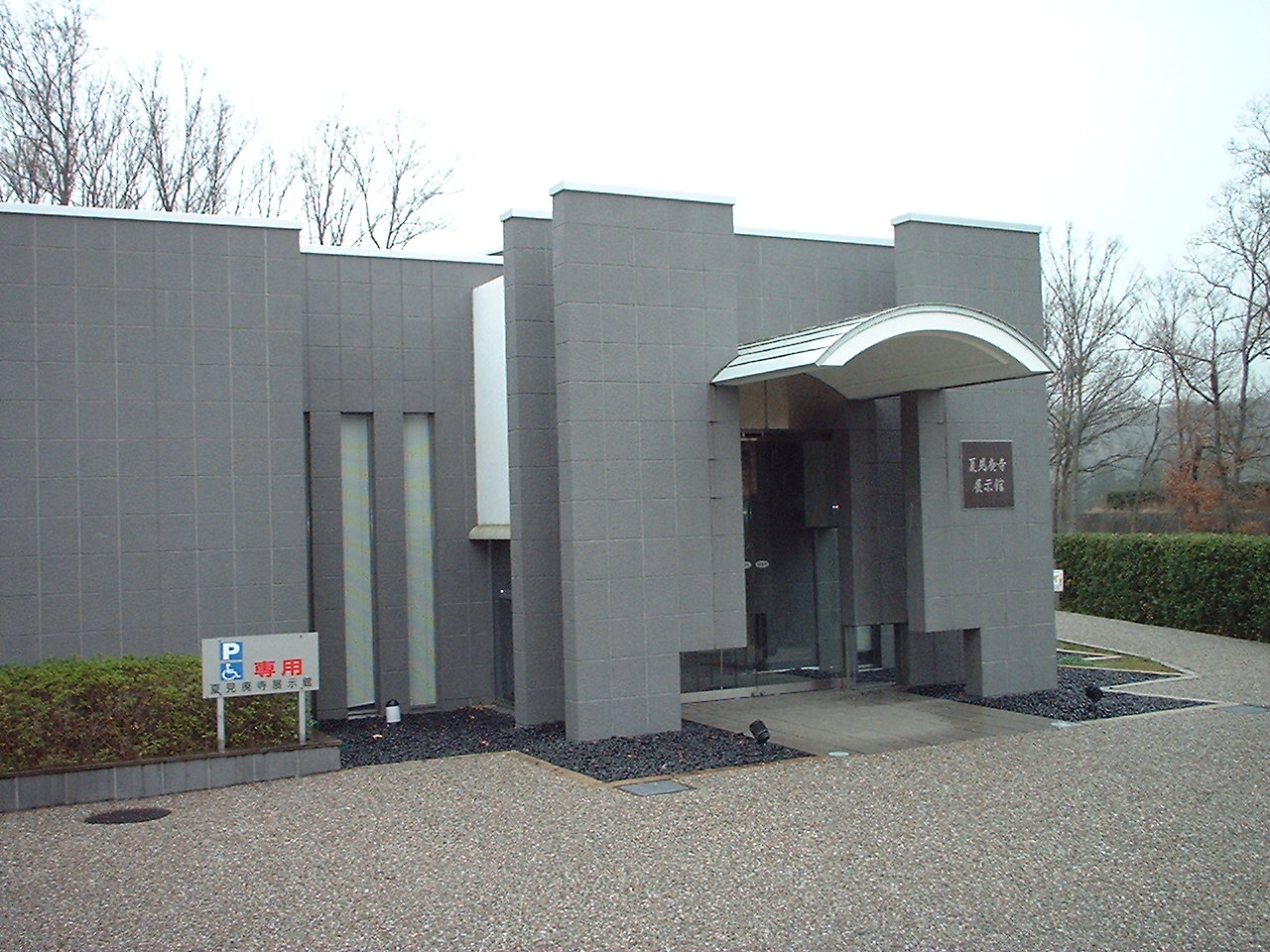
Natsumi Temple Ruins Exhibition Hall

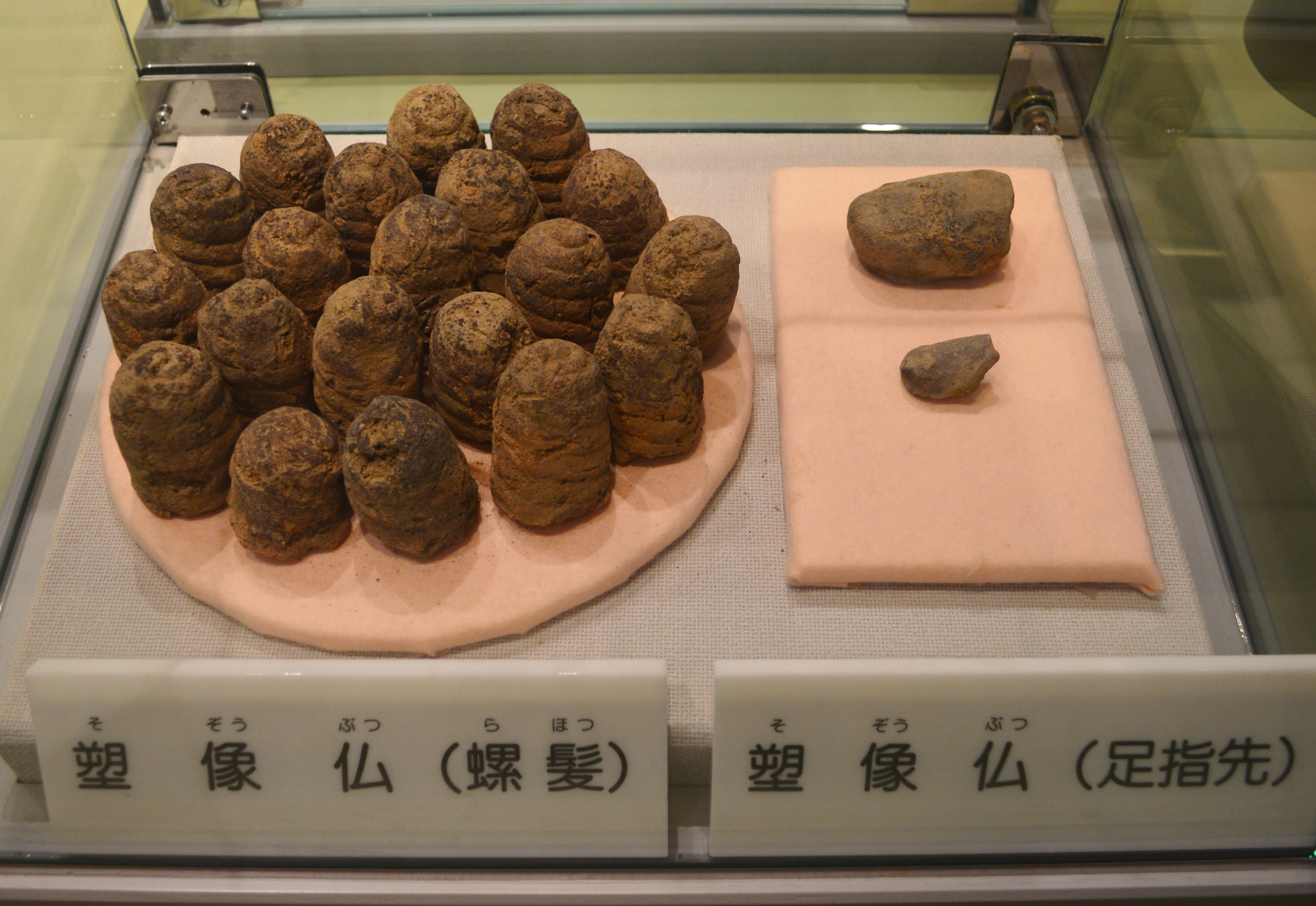
Fragments of a Buddha image

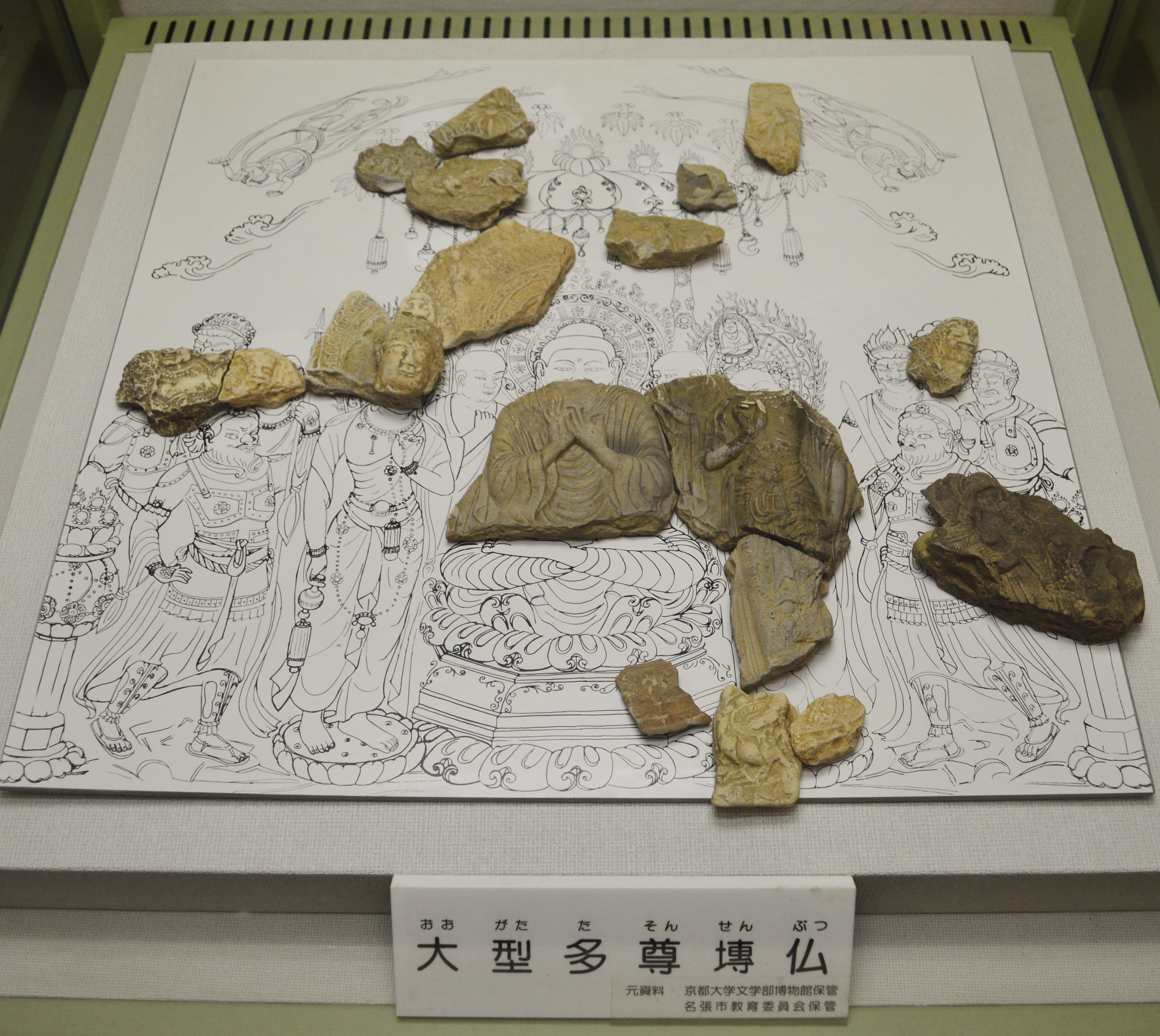
Fragments of Buddha images

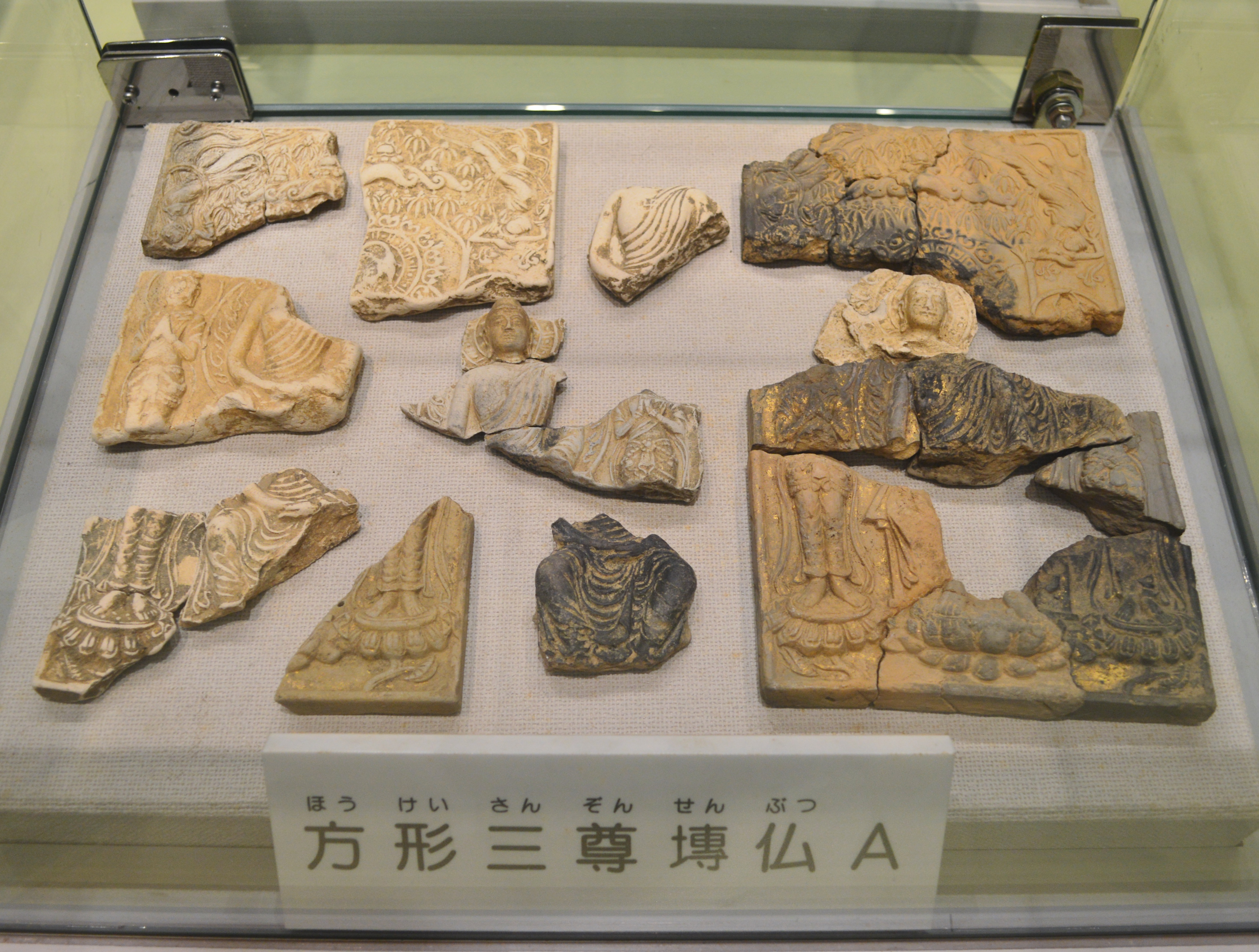
Fragments of Buddha images

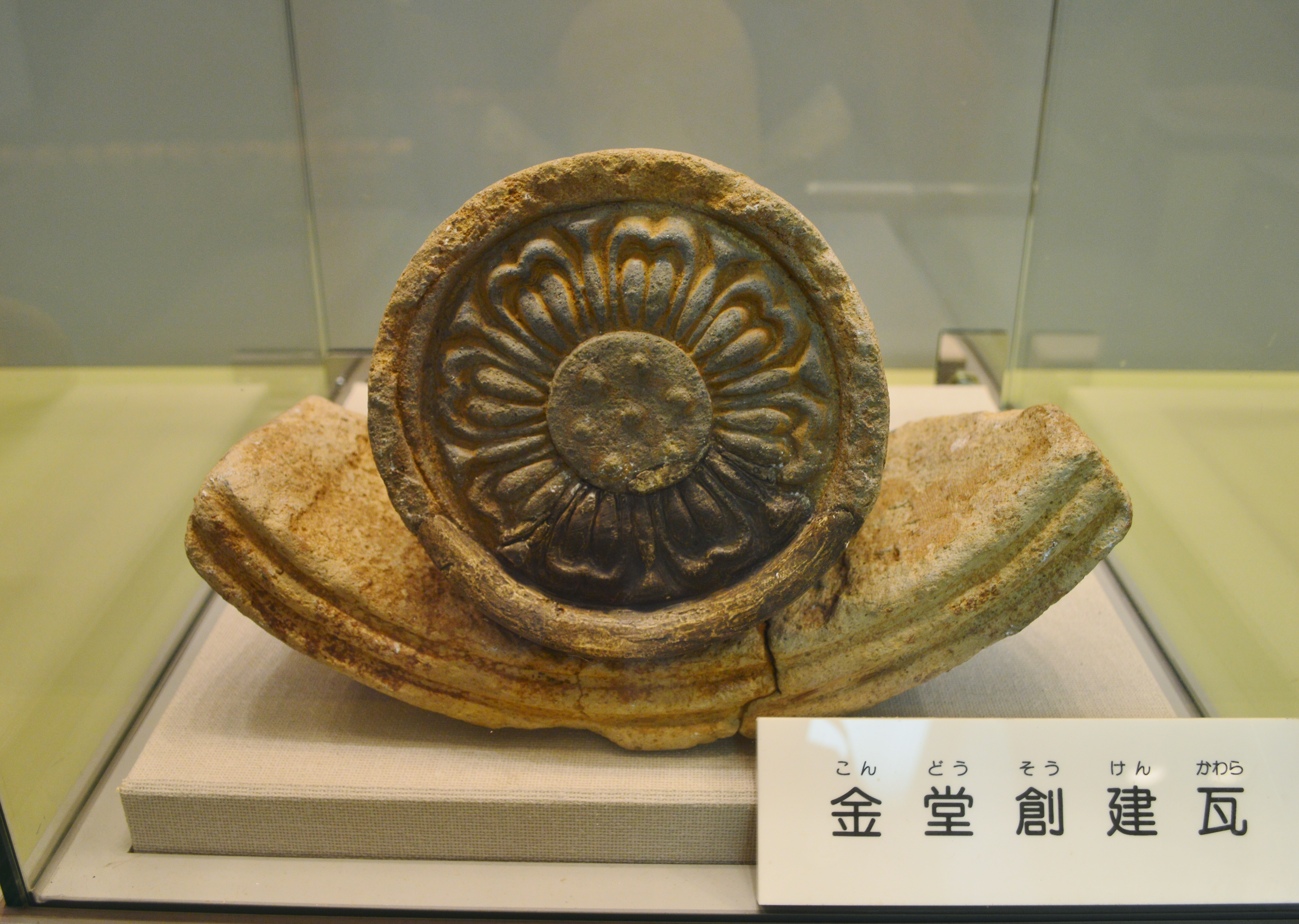
Roof tile from Kondo

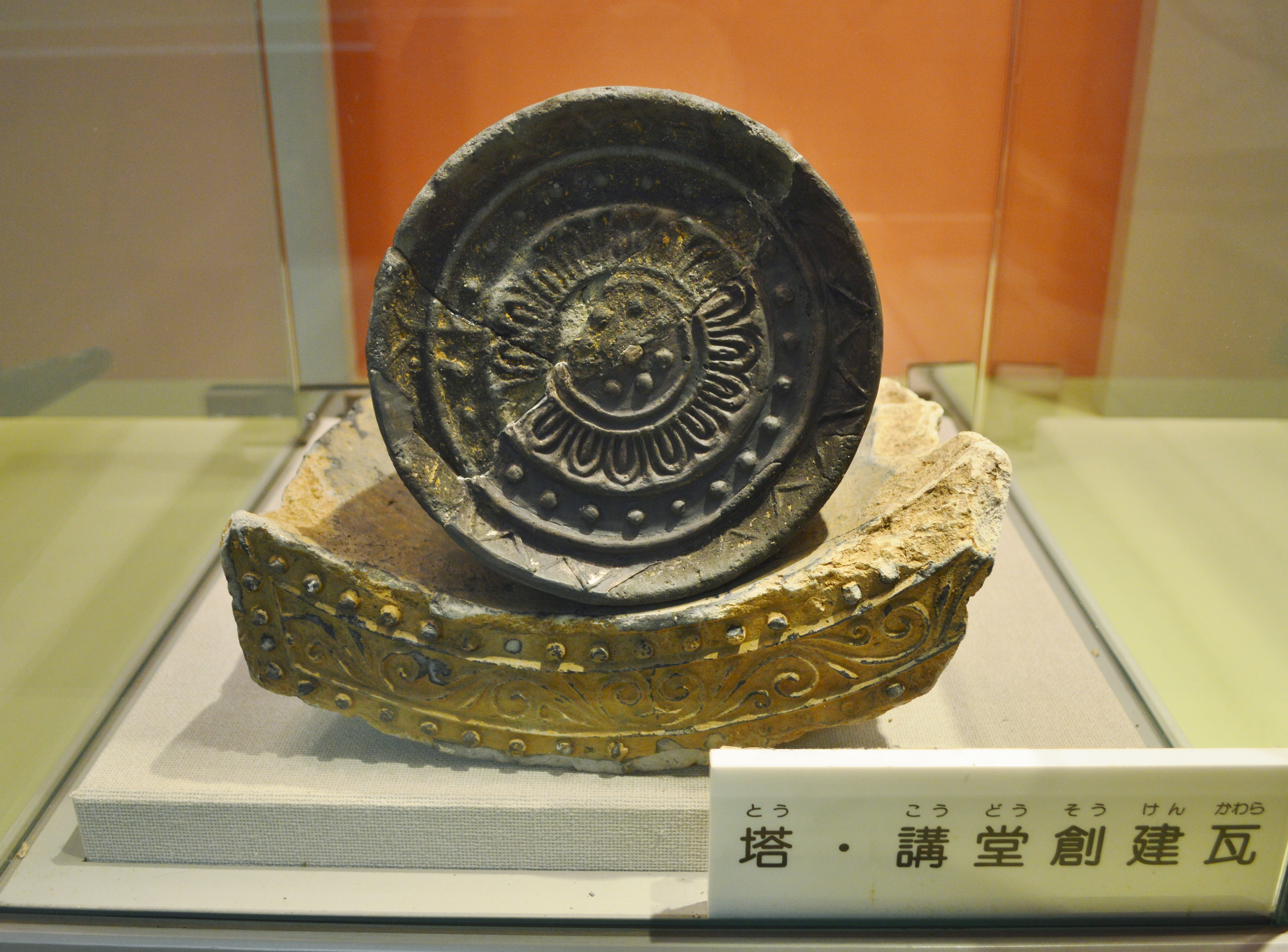
Roof tile from Lecture Hall

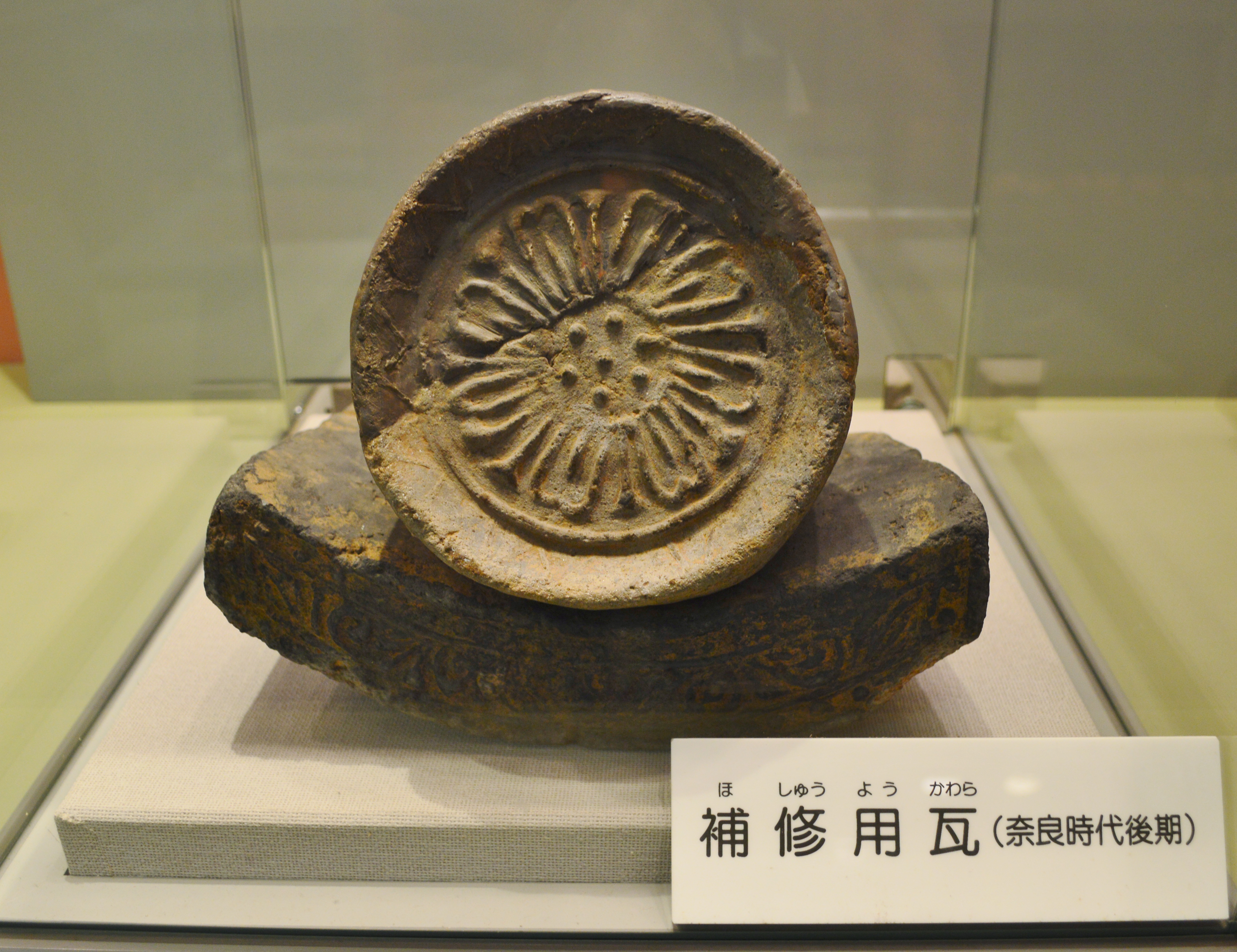
Artifacts found under altar

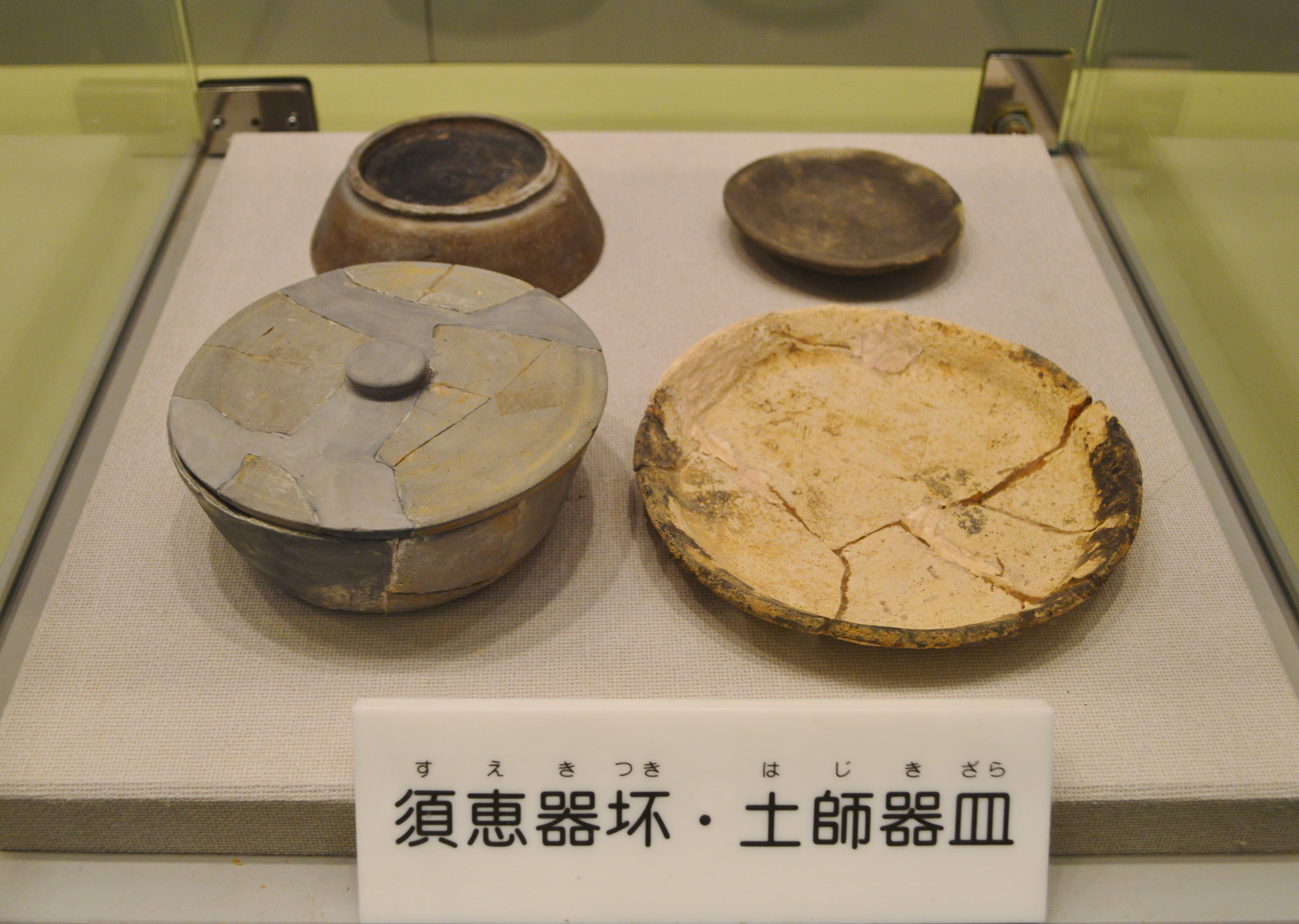
Sue ware pottery

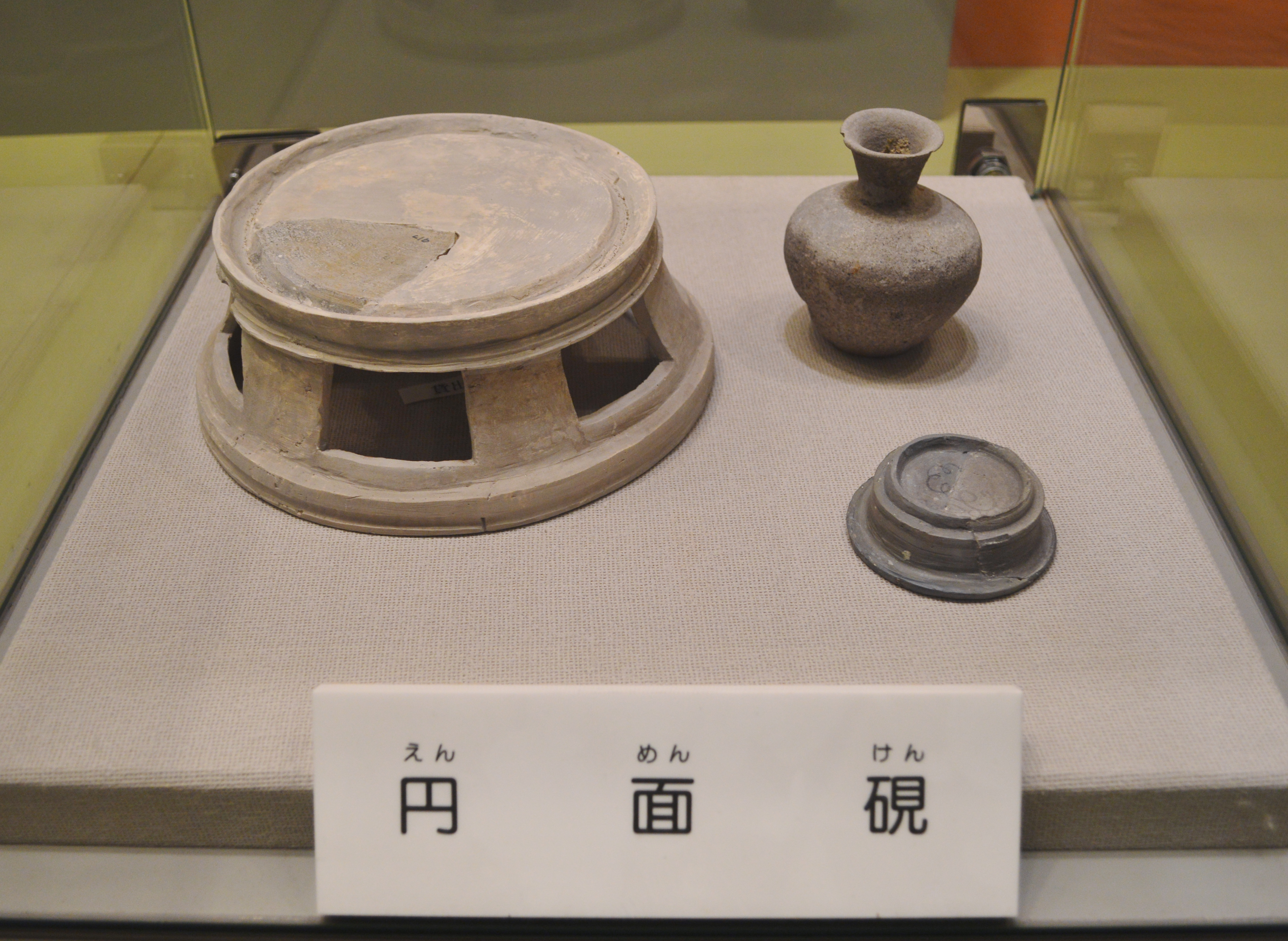
Sue ware pottery

== See also ==
- List of Historic Sites of Japan (Mie)
