= Sambommatsu Station (Nara) =

Railway station in Uda, Nara Prefecture, Japan

Sambommatsu Station 三本松駅
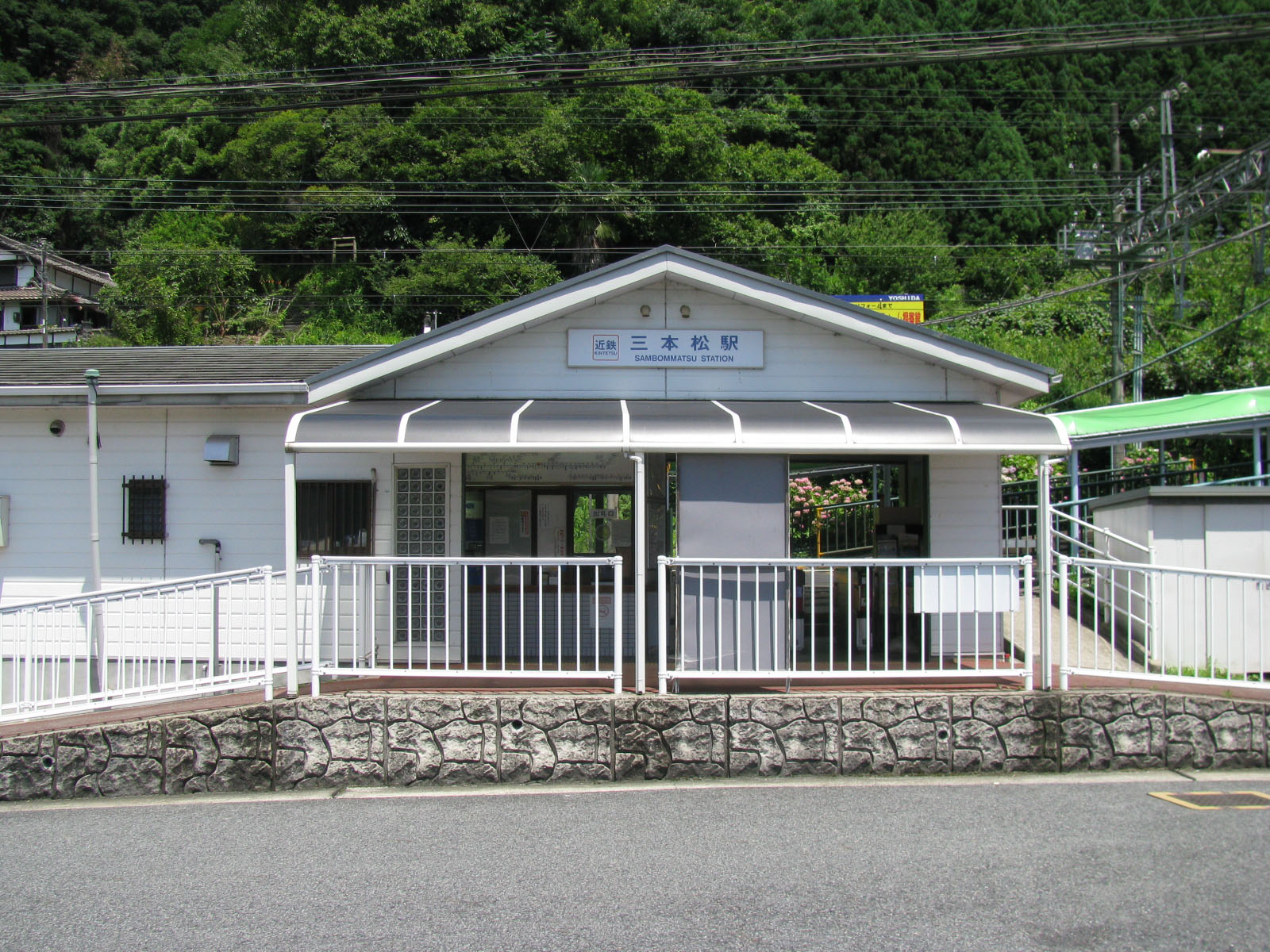
- Sambommatsu Station

General information
- Location: 2937, Murō-Sambommatsu, Uda-shi, Nara-ken 633-0317; Japan
- Coordinates: 34°34′42″N 136°02′08″E
- Operator: Kintetsu Railway
- Line: D Osaka Line
- Distance: 59.7 km from Osaka-Uehommachi
- Platforms: 2 side platforms
- Tracks: 2
- Connections

Other information
- Station code: D47
- Website: Official website

History
- Opened: 10 October 1930

Passengers
- FY2019: 95 daily

Services
Preceding station	Kintetsu Railway	Following station
Murōguchi-Ōno towards Osaka Uehommachi	Osaka Line Local Semi-Express Express	Akameguchi towards Ise-Nakagawa
Location
- Location within Nara Prefecture Location within Japan

Sambommatsu Station (三本松駅, Sambommatsu-eki) is a passenger railway station located in the city of Uda, Nara Prefecture, Japan. It is operated by the private transportation company, Kintetsu Railway.

== Line ==
Sambommatsu Station is served by the Osaka Line and is 59.7 kilometers from the starting point of the line at Osaka-Uehommachi.

== Layout ==
The station has two side platforms connected by a level crossing. The effective length of the platform is enough for six cars.

=== Platforms ===
1	■ Osaka Line	for Nabari, Ise-Nakagawa, Kashikojima and Nagoya
2	■ Osaka Line	for Yamato-Yagi and Ōsaka Uehommachi

== History ==
Sambonmatsu Station opened on 10 October 1930 on the Sangu Express Railway. On 15 March 1941, the line merged with the Osaka Electric Tramway and became the Kansai Express Railway's Osaka Line. This line was merged with the Nankai Electric Railway on 1 June 1944 to form Kintetsu.

== Passenger statistics ==
In fiscal 2019, the station was used by an average of 95 passengers daily (boarding passengers only).

== Surrounding area ==
- Flower Village Takiya Iris Garden
- Roadside Station Udaji Muro

== See also ==
- List of railway stations in Japan
