= Natsumi Ikegaya =

Japanese association football player

Personal information
- Date of birth: 14 June 1990 (age 36)
- Place of birth: Shizuoka Prefecture, Japan
- Height: 1.63 m (5 ft 4 in)
- Position: Goalkeeper

Team information
- Current team: AC Nagano Parceiro
- Number: 1

Senior career*
Years	Team	Apps	(Gls)
- AC Nagano Parceiro
- * Club domestic league appearances and goals

Natsumi Ikegaya (born 14 June 1990) is a Japanese professional footballer who plays as a goalkeeper for WE League club AC Nagano Parceiro.

== Club career ==
Ikegaya made her WE League debut on 26 September 2021.
