= Zao =

Zao may refer to:

- Mayor Zao, a character in the video game Freedom Planet
- Zao (American band), a metalcore band from West Virginia
- Zao (French band)
- Mount Zaō, a mountain in northern Japan
- Zaō, Miyagi, a town in Japan
- Zaō Station, a JR East station in Yamagata Prefecture, Japan
- 5751 Zao, an asteroid
- ZAO, an abbreviation for a Russian closed joint-stock company
- Zao Wou-Ki (1920-2013), Chinese-French contemporary painter
- ZAO, a free Chinese Deepfake app
- Captain Zao, Chinese submarine officer in Fallout 4
- Zao, evil North Korean military officer in Die Another Day
