= Matsuko =

- Gender: Female

Origin
- Origin: Japanese
- Meaning: Different meanings depending on the kanji used

Matsuko is a feminine Japanese given name and surname. Notable people with the name include:

- Matsuko Deluxe (born 1972), Japanese columnist, essayist and TV personality
- Matsuko Mawatari (馬渡 松子; born 1967), Japanese singer-songwriter
- Kido Matsuko (木戸 松子; 1843-1886), Japanese lover of Katsura Kogorō

== See also ==
- Memories of Matsuko, a 2006 Japanese film
