= Natsuki Obama =

Japanese fashion model & actor (born 1984)

- 小濱なつき
- Born: February 12, 1984 (age 41); Ōura, Kagoshima Prefecture, Japan
- Occupations: Fashion model; Actor
- Children: 1
- Modeling information
- Hair color: Brown
- Eye color: Brown
- Agency: EnergyModelAgency
- Website: www.energystyle.net/2016sep/obama.html

Natsuki Obama (小濱なつき, Obama Natsuki; born February 12, 1984) is a Japanese fashion model and actor. She appeared in the national "What should I do to coordinate tomorrow?" campaign for the fashion magazine Marisol in 2017 and 2018.

While attending Kagoshima Girl's High School, she was a member of the volleyball team that went to the national finals. Obama was a finalist for the 3rd Cover Girl Prize given out by Magazine Summit, a national organization for magazine publishers in Japan. Obama has used her celebrity status to support products such as shōchū that are produced in Minamisatsuma.

She gave birth to a daughter in 2019.

== Filmography ==
=== Film ===
- Kids (2008)
- MW (2009, Kanako)

=== Television ===
- Nodame Cantabile (2006, guest star)
- Shika Otoko A wo Niyoshi (2008, Kako Harawa)
- Rinjō (2009, Sayoko Kataoka, based on the short story collection from Hideo Yokoyama)
