= Natsume =

Natsume (夏目, 夏芽, 棗, なつめ or ナツメ) is a Japanese feminine given name and a surname, and may refer to:

== People with the given name ==
- Natsume (drummer) (夏芽), a Japanese drummer and voice actress
- Natsume Akatsuki (暁 なつめ), a Japanese light novel author and manga writer
- Natsume Mito (三戸 なつめ; born 1990), a Japanese model, singer, and presenter
- Natsume Ono (オノ ナツメ; born 1977), a Japanese manga artist
- Natsume Sano (佐野 夏芽; born 1985), a Japanese gravure idol

== People with the surname ==
- Fusanosuke Natsume (夏目 房之介; born 1950), a Japanese columnist and cartoonist
- Masako Natsume (夏目 雅子; 1957–1985), a Japanese actor
- Nana Natsume (夏目 ナナ; born 1980), a Japanese former adult video (AV) actress
- Rio Natsume (夏目 理緒; born 1985), a Japanese gravure idol
- Shingo Natsume (夏目 真悟; born 1980), a Japanese director
- Suzu Natsume (夏目 鈴; born 1991), a Japanese actress
- Sōseki Natsume (夏目 漱石; 1867–1916), a Japanese novelist of the early years of the 20th century
- Yoshinobu Natsume (夏目 吉信; 1517–1573), Japanese samurai
- Yoshinori Natsume (夏目 義徳; born 1975), Japanese manga artist
- Yuki Natsume (棗 佑喜; born 1988), Japanese footballer

== Fictional characters ==
- Atsuko Natsume, the protagonist of the All Purpose Cultural Cat Girl Nuku Nuku
- Natsume Hyūga, a character in the anime/manga series Alice Academy
- Natsume Takashi, the title character in the manga and anime series Natsume's Book of Friends
- Maya Natsume, a character in the anime Tenjho Tenge
- Asako Natsume, a character in the manga My Little Monster (Tonari No Kaibutsu-kun)
- Mio Natsume, a character in the tokusatsu series Ressha Sentai ToQger
- Mio Natsume, a character in the anime series Just Because!
- Natsume, known as "Coco" in English, a character in Fighting Foodons
- Mai Natsume, a character from the BlazBlue series
- Natsume, a character in the anime Deca-Dence
- Natsume, a character in the anime Hidamari Sketch
- Sakasaki Natsume, a character in the idol rhythm game Ensemble Stars!

== Companies ==
- Natsume Atari, formerly Natsume Co., Ltd., a Japanese video game developer and publisher founded in 1987
- Natsume Inc., an American video game publisher founded in 1988 as a division of the Japanese company, but later becoming independent

== Other uses ==
- Natsume (ナツメ)/棗, Japanese name for the Jujube fruit (Ziziphus jujuba)
- Natsume (棗; "jujube"), a type of chaki (tea caddy) used in Japanese tea ceremony
- Natsume (なつめ), the former name of Sanjuro, the Lord of Bitchū Matsuyama Castle
