= Nabari Station =

Railway station in Nabari, Mie Prefecture, Japan

Nabari Station 名張駅
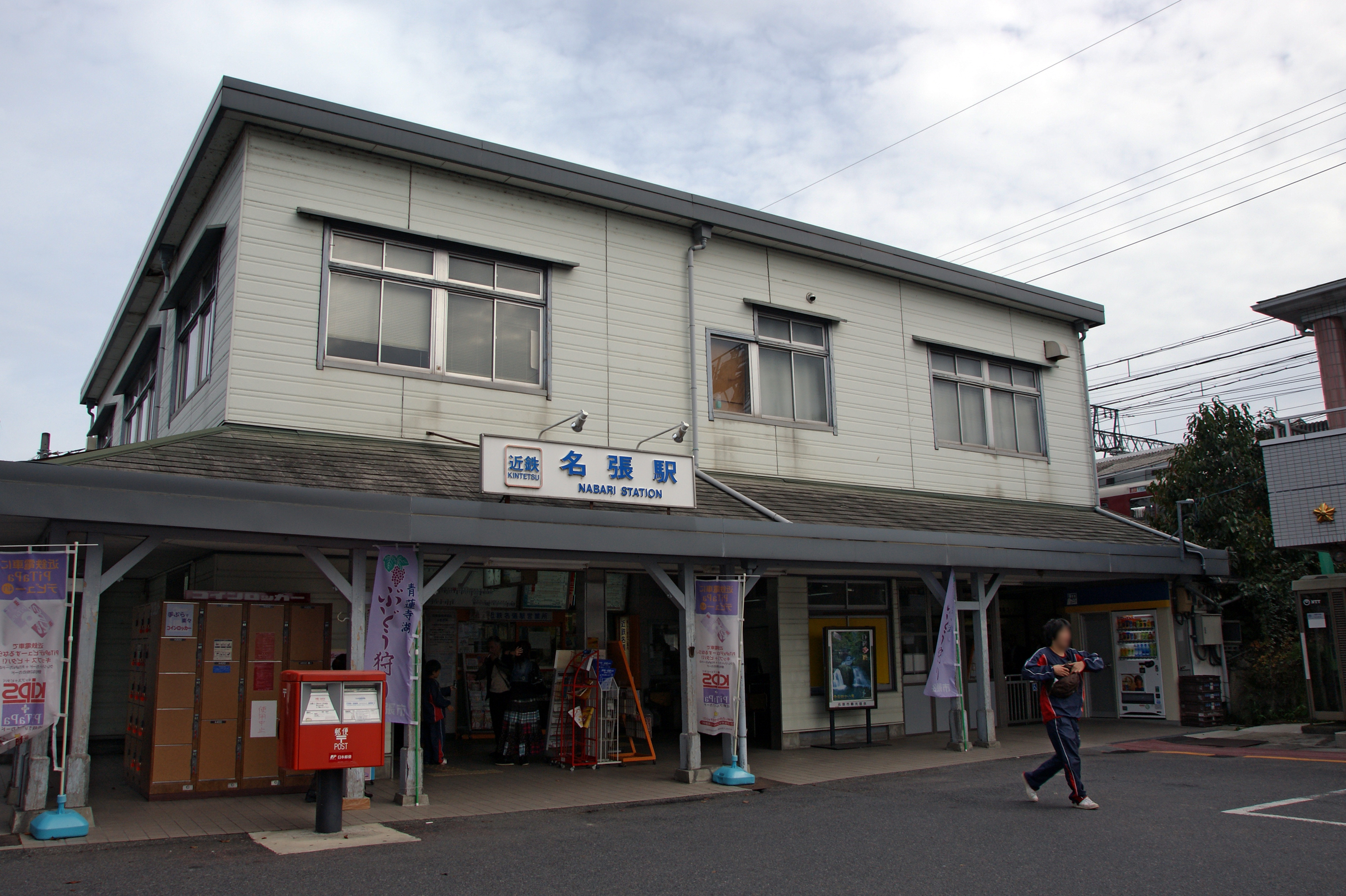
- Nabari Station

General information
- Location: 2961 Hirao, Nabari-shi, Mie-ken 518-0713; Japan
- Coordinates: 34°37′18″N 136°05′45″E
- Operator: Kintetsu Railway
- Line: Osaka Line
- Distance: 67.2 km from Ōsaka Uehommachi
- Platforms: 2 island platforms

Other information
- Station code: D49
- Website: Official website

History
- Opened: October 10, 1930

Passengers
- FY2019: 5910 daily
Location
- Location within Mie Prefecture Location within Japan

Nabari Station (名張駅, Nabari-eki) is a passenger railway station in located in the city of Nabari, Mie Prefecture, Japan, operated by the private railway operator Kintetsu Railway.

== Lines ==
Nabari Station is served by the Osaka Line, and is located 67.2 rail kilometers from the starting point of the line at Ōsaka Uehommachi Station.

== Station layout ==
The station consists of two island platform serving four ground-level tracks, connect by an underground passage.

=== Platforms ===
1, 2	■ Osaka Line	for Ise-Nakagawa, Ujiyamada, Kashikojima and Nagoya
3, 4	■ Osaka Line	for Yamato-Yagi, Osaka Uehommachi and Osaka Namba

== Adjacent stations ==
«	Service	»
Osaka Line
Akameguchi	Local	Kikyōgaoka
Akameguchi	Semi-Express; Suburban Semi-Express	Terminus
Akameguchi	Express	Kikyōgaoka
Akameguchi	Rapid Express	Kikyōgaoka
Yamato-Yagi	Limited Express	Iga-Kambe

== History ==
Nabari Station opened on October 10, 1930, as a station on the Sangu Express Electric Railway. After merging with Osaka Electric Kido on March 15, 1941, the line became the Kansai Express Railway's Osaka Line. This line was merged with the Nankai Electric Railway on June 1, 1944, to form Kintetsu.

== Passenger statistics ==
In fiscal 2019, the station was used by an average of 5910 passengers daily (boarding passengers only).

== Surrounding area ==
- Mie Prefectural Nabari High School
- Nabari Post Office
- Nabari City Library

== See also ==
- List of railway stations in Japan
