= Meihan Expressway =

Expressway in Japan

Meihan Expressway
- 名阪国道

Route information
- Maintained by MLIT
- Length: 73.3 km (45.5 mi)
- Existed: 1962–present
- Component highways: National Route 25

Major junctions
- East end: Higashi-Meihan Expressway / National Route 1 / National Route 25 at Kameyama Interchange in Kameyama
- Ise Expressway in Kameyama; National Route 163 in Iga; National Route 422 in Iga; National Route 369 in Nara

Section 1
- West end: Nishi-Meihan Expressway / National Route 169 at Tenri Interchange in Tenri

Location
- Country: Japan

Highway system
- National highways of Japan; Expressways of Japan

The Meihan Expressway (名阪国道, Meihan kokudō) is a national expressway in Mie Prefecture and Nara Prefecture, Japan. The expressway is also known as the Meihan National Highway that is a literal translation of its Japanese name. Together with the Nishi-Meihan Expressway and Higashi-Meihan Expressway, it is the central portion of a corridor linking the greater Nagoya and Osaka areas. It is owned and operated by Ministry of Land, Infrastructure, Transport and Tourism and is signed as an auxiliary route of National Route 25 as well as E25 under their "Expressway Numbering System."

== Naming ==
Meihan is a Sino-Japanese pronunciation of two-character kanji acronym for Nagoya and Osaka (名阪). The first character of three-character kanji that represents Nagoya (名古屋) is pronounced as mei, whereas the second character of two-character kanji that represents Osaka (大阪) is pronounced as han.

== History ==
Construction on the Meihan Expressway began in March 1962, with an intended construction period of only one thousand days. The rapid construction of expressways in Japan at the time was spearheaded by Minister of Construction Ichirō Kōno in preparation for the 1964 Summer Olympics in Tokyo. It was opened as a two-lane expressway in December 1965.

== Interchange list ==
Prefecture	Location	km	mi	Exit	Name	Destinations	Notes
Mie	Kameyama	0.0	0.0	1	Kameyama	National Route 1 / National Route 25 – Central Kameyama, Otsu	Continued as Higashi-Meihan Expressway to Nagoya. Signed as Interchange 33 for westbound exit and eastbound entrance.
Mie	Kameyama	0.5	0.31	N/A	N/A	National Route 1 (Seki Bypass) – Yokkaichi, Suzuka	Eastbound exit and westbound entrance.
Mie	Kameyama	1.7	1.1	N/A	Seki Junction	Ise Expressway – Tsu, Ise	Interchange 34 on Ise Expressway.
Mie	Kameyama	2.8	1.7	2	Seki	Mie Prefecture Route 10 to National Route 25 – Seki; Mie Prefecture Route 10 – Tsu	Meihan Seki Drive-in is adjacent to the interchange.
Mie	Kameyama	6.1	3.8	3	Kuga	Kuga	
Mie	Kameyama			Seki Tunnel			
Mie	Kameyama	8.5	5.3	4	Mukai	Mukai	
Mie	Kameyama	10.5	6.5	5	Itaya	Itaya	
Mie	Kameyama	11.6	7.2	6	Minamizaike	Minamizaike	
Mie	Iga			Kabuto Tunnel			
Mie	Iga	16.7	10.4	7	Iga	National Route 25 – Tsuge	
Mie	Iga	16.9	10.5	Michi-no-eki Iga (westbound / outbound) / Iga Service Area (eastbound / inbound)			
Mie	Iga	18.6	11.6	8	Kamitsuge	Mie Prefecture Route 4 (Iga Corridor Road) – Minakuchi, Koka (Tsuge)	
Mie	Iga	21.1	13.1	9	Shimotsuge	Mie Prefecture Route 133 – Shimotsuge	
Mie	Iga	22.4	13.9	10	Midai	Mie Prefecture Route 2 – Shindo, Iga, Oyamada	
Mie	Iga	23.1	14.4	11	Mibuno	Mie Prefecture Route 49 – Ayama, Shigaraki (Oyamada)	
Mie	Iga	26.8	16.7	12	Igaichinomiya	Mie Prefecture Route 138 to National Route 163 – Kizugawa, Shimagahara	
Mie	Iga	29.2	18.1	13	Nakase	National Route 163 – Central Ueno, Oyamada	
Mie	Iga	31.3	19.4	14	Tomono	Mie Prefecture Route 56 – Tomono, Central Ueno	
Mie	Iga	32.8	20.4	15	Uenohigashi	National Route 422 – Central Ueno, Aoyama	
Mie	Iga	34.0	21.1	16	Ueno	National Route 368 – Ueno, Nabari	
Mie	Iga	35.4	22.0	17	Ouchi	Ouchi, Onogi	Ueno Ninja Drive-in is adjacent to the interchange.
Mie	Iga			Iga-Ueno Parking Area (westbound / outbound only)			
Mie	Iga	38.3	23.8	18	Shirakashi	Mie Prefecture Route 686 – Tsukigase, Shirakashi	
Mie	Iga	40.4	25.1	19	Hatta	Mie Prefecture Route 687 – Tsukigase, Kasagi (Hatta, Nabari)	
Nara	Yamazoe	42.3	26.3	20	Satsukibashi	National Route 25 – Satsukibashi, Tsukigase (Nabari)	
Nara	Yamazoe	45.0	28.0	21	Yamazoe	奈良県道80号標識 Nara Prefecture Route 80 – Yamazoe (Nara, Nabari)	
Nara	Yamazoe	49.5	30.8	22	Konoguchi	National Route 25 – Konoguchi (Tsuge, Tsukigase)	
Nara	Nara	53.6	33.3	23	Ogura	Yamanami Road / 奈良県道127号標識 National Route 25 / Nara Prefecture Route 127 – Ogura (Muro, Tsuge, Tsukigase)	
Nara	Nara	56.4	35.0	24	Hari	National Route 369 – Hari, Tsuge (Yagyu, Haibara, Muro, Yoshino)	Hari T.R.S, Michi-no-eki is adjacent to the interchange.
Nara	Nara	58.7	36.5	25	Ipponmatsu	National Route 25 – Ipponmatsu (Inoichi, Fukusumi)	
Nara	Tenri	61.4	38.2	26	Fukusumi	National Route 25 – Fukusumi (Tenri, Chishawara, Inoichi, Bessho)	
Nara	Nara			Takamine Service Area (westbound / outbound only)			
Nara	Nara	67.6	42.0	27	Gokadani	Gokadani (Nara, Nakabatake, Maitani)	
Nara	Tenri	71.2	44.2	28	Tenrihigashi	奈良県道51号標識 Nara Prefecture Route 51 – Tenrihigashi (Tenri, Iwaya, Shirakawa)	
Nara	Tenri	73.3	45.5	29	Tenri	奈良県道51号標識 Nara Prefecture Route 51 to National Route 169 – Tenri, Nara (Sakurai)	Continued as Nishi-Meihan Expressway to Osaka. Signed as Interchange 6 for eastbound exit and westbound entrance.
1.000 mi = 1.609 km; 1.000 km = 0.621 mi: Incomplete access
