= E25 =

E25 or E-25 may refer to:

- E25 fuel, see Common ethanol fuel mixtures
- European route E25, a road connecting Hook of Holland in the Netherlands and Palermo in Italy
- A German World War II tank version, see Entwicklung series#JagdpanzerE-25
- A variant of the Nissan Caravan produced from 2001-2012
- Meihan Expressway and Nishi-Meihan Expressway, route E25 in Japan
- Kuala Lumpur–Kuala Selangor Expressway, route E25 in Malaysia
- Ecuador Highway 25 or E25, Troncal de la Costa (Coastal Trunk) which goes from San Miguel de los Bancos through Guayaquil to Peru
