= Kameyama-juku =

Forty-sixth of the 53 stations of the Tōkaidō

Kameyama-juku 亀山宿
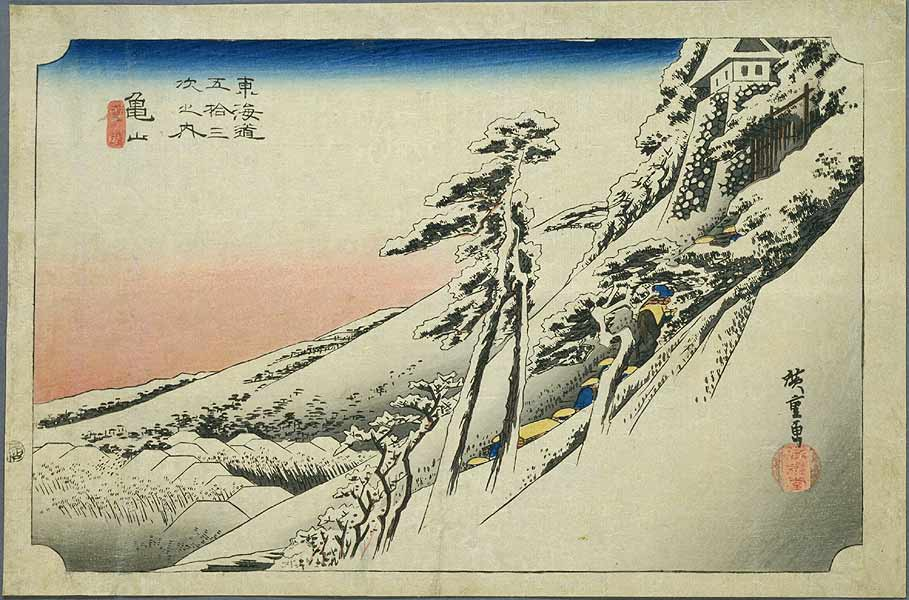
- Hiroshige's print of Sakashita-juku, part of the Hōeidō edition The Fifty-three Stations of the Tōkaidō series

General information
- Location: Kameyama, Mie (former Ise Province); Japan
- Coordinates: 34°51′15.41″N 136°27′17.30″E
- Elevation: 77 m (253 ft)
- System: post station
- Line: Tōkaidō
- Distance: 408.7 km from Edo
Location
- Location within Mie Prefecture Location within Japan

Kameyama-juku (亀山宿, Kameyama-juku) was the forty-sixth of the fifty-three stations (shukuba) of the Tōkaidō connecting Edo with Kyoto in Edo period Japan. It was located in former Ise Province in what is now the center of the city of Kameyama, Mie Prefecture, Japan.

== History ==
Kameyama was the location of a castle built in the Kamakura period by the Seki clan to protect their territories in northern Ise. During the Sengoku period, Seki Kazumasa had been transferred from the clan's ancestral territory by Toyotomi Hideyoshi, but was restored as daimyō of Ise-Kameyama Domain by Tokugawa Ieyasu, and constructed a new Kameyama Castle. Along with the castle, he laid out the foundations for a new castle town, which due it its position on the Tōkaidō, was also a post town. Unlike other post towns, Kameyama-juku had two large fortified gates at either end, which also served as part of the defenses of the castle. The Ego-guchi gate was completed in 1673 and faced towards Edo. It measured 120 meters east-to-west by 70 meters north-to-south, with a moat on the north and east sides to form a curved ring surrounded by earthworks and earthworks, and a flat yagura turret at the eastern end. The inside of the Kuruwa was divided into three parts, each of which was shaped like a box. A guard station was set up in the western section to monitor passersby. Similarly, on the western side was the Kyoguchi Gate, completed in 1672. However, in this case, the gate was set at the top of a steep slope, which was planted on either side with thorny orange trees to discourage attackers from climbing the hillside. As travelers en route to Edo had to look up the steep slope to the massive gate structures, this made the gate (and castle) appear more formidable.

Per the 1843 "東海道宿村大概帳" (Tōkaidō Shukuson Taigaichō) guidebook issued by the Inspector of Highways (道中奉行, Dōchu-būgyō), the town had a population of 1549 with one honjin, one wakihonjin, and 21 hatago. It had one Tonyaba, for the stabling of packhorses and warehousing of goods, and one kōsatsu for the display of official notifications. It was 408.7 kilometers from Edo. Although Kameyama-juku was reportedly prosperous, daimyō processions on sankin kōtai avoided staying at Kameyama as the castle was a designated lodging for the Shogun (should he ever decide to travel to Kyoto) and the post station itself was under direct shogunal control.

There are many buildings still remaining of both the post and castle town today, although neither of its massive gates have survived.

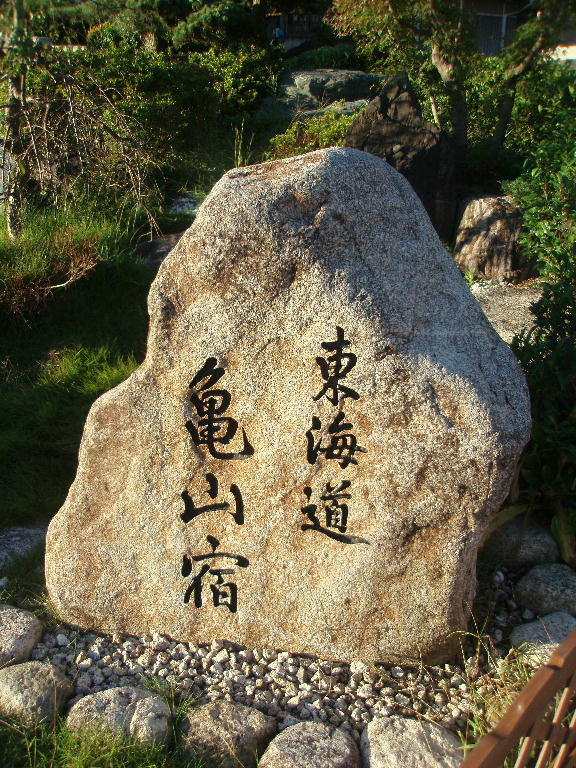
Kameyama-juku monument

== Kameyama-juku in The Fifty-three Stations of the Tōkaidō ==
Utagawa Hiroshige's ukiyo-e Hōeidō edition print of Kameyama-juku dates from 1833 -1834. The print depicts travelers climbing a steep hillside to the Kyoguchi Gate, with the roofs of a town extending at a right angle to then left of the composition. Inexplicably, Hiroshige depicted the scene in mid-winter, with very heavy snows, although the Kameyama area is not noted for severe winters.

== Neighboring post towns ==
Tōkaidō
Shōno-juku - Kameyama-juku - Seki-juku
