= Kameyama Castle (Mie) =

Coordinates: 34°51′22.13″N 136°27′2.13″E

- 亀山城
- Kameyama, Mie Prefecture, Japan
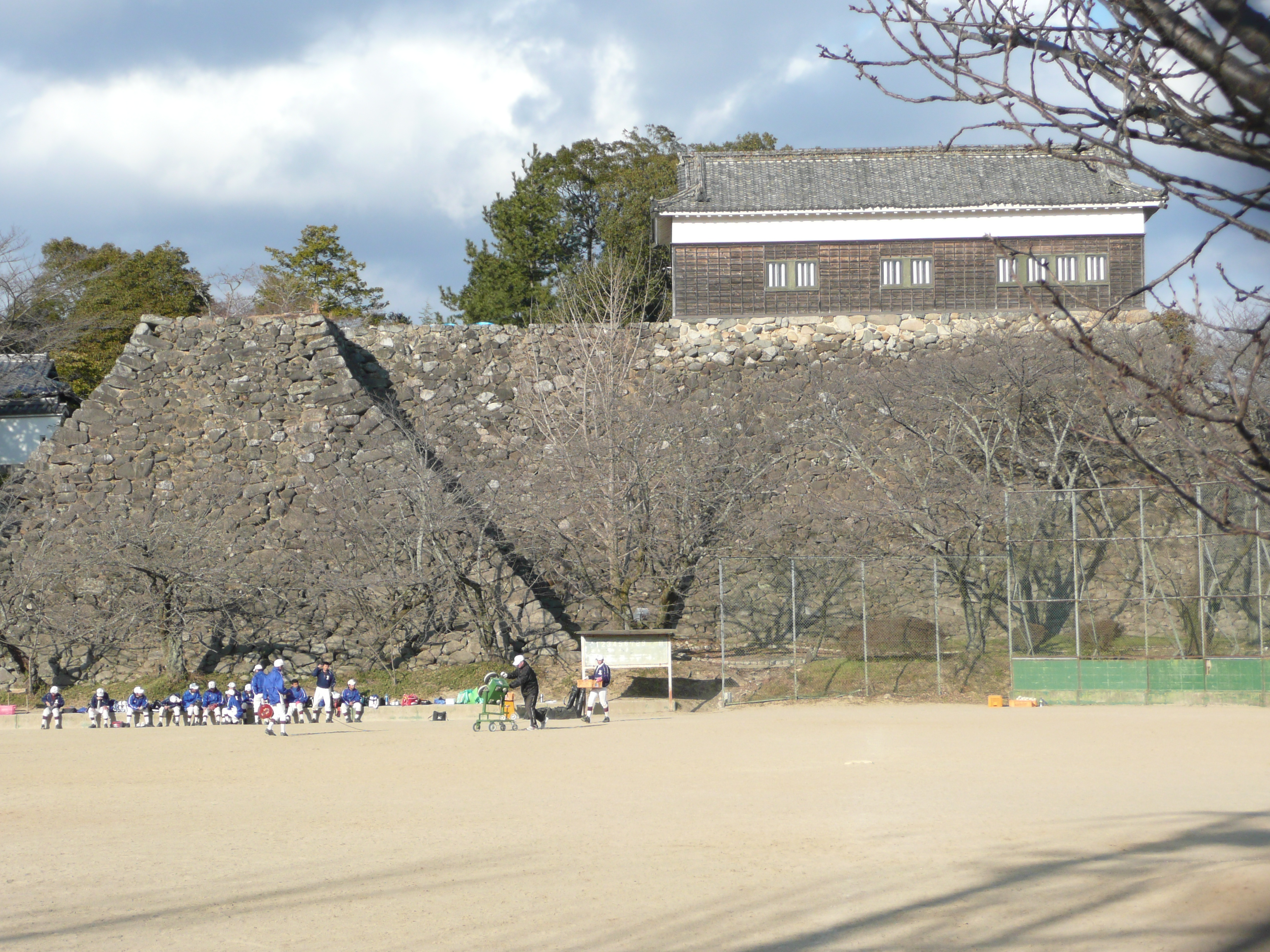
- Tamon-yagura of Kameyama Castle

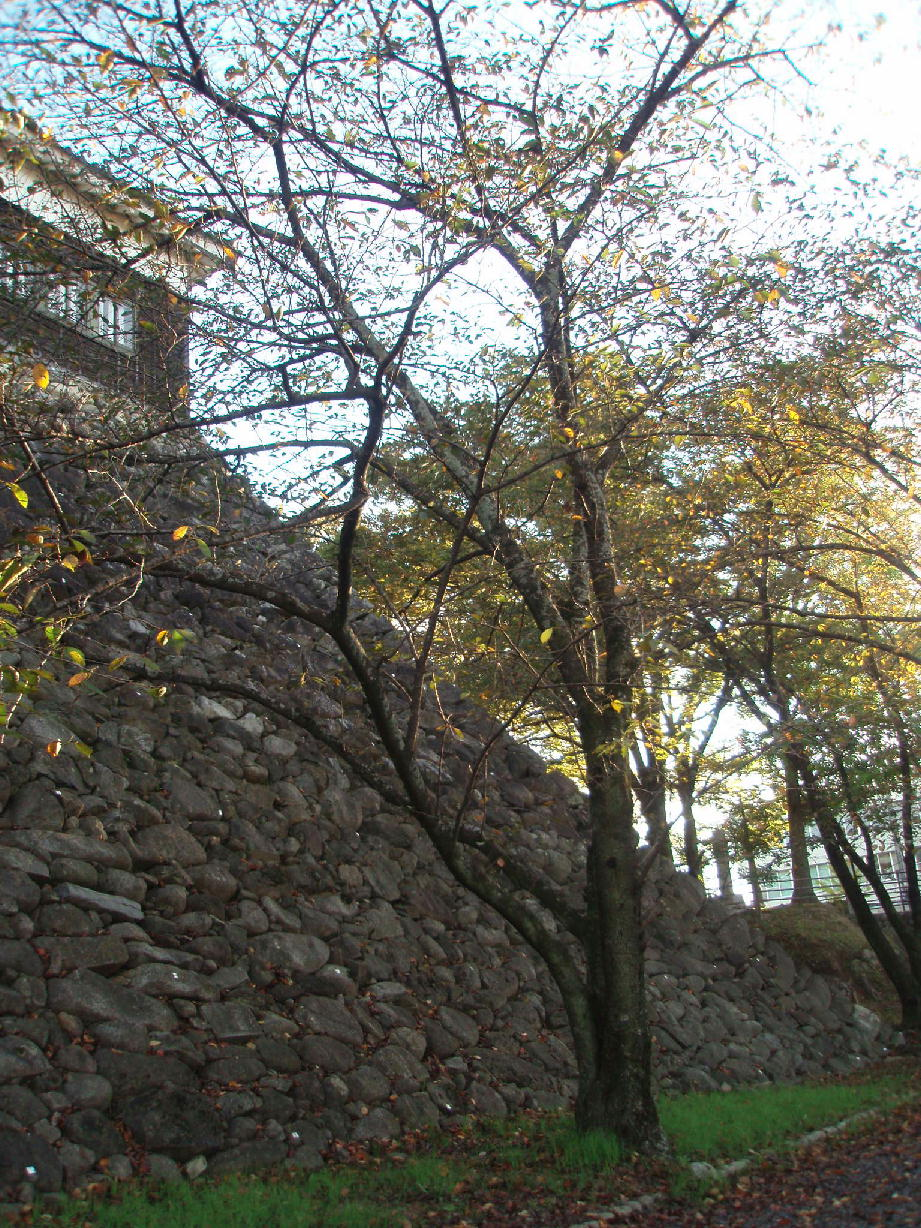
- Kameyama Castle Tamon-yagura

Site information
- Type: flatlands-style Japanese castle
- Open to the public: yes

Location

Site history
- Built: 1590
- Built by: Okamoto Munenori
- In use: Edo period
- Demolished: 1873

Kameyama Castle (亀山城, Kameyama-jō) is a Japanese castle located in Kameyama, northern Mie Prefecture, Japan. At the end of the Edo period, Kameyama Castle was home to the Ishikawa clan, daimyō of Ise-Kameyama Domain. The castle was also known as "Kochō-jō" (粉蝶城).

== History ==
The original Kameyama Castle was founded by Seki Sanetada in 1264 to the west of the present Kameyama Castle, and was one of the five fortifications guarding the clan domains in northern Ise Province. It came under occasional attack by the Oda clan to the north, and was overrun when Oda Nobunaga extended his authority over Ise Province. In 1583, Hideyoshi defeated Takigawa Kazumasu at Kameyama castle. When Seki Kazumasa was relocated to Shirakawa in 1590, Okamoto Munenori, a retainer of Toyotomi Hideyoshi was given control of the castle. Okamoto moved the castle to the southeast and reconstructed all the main structures.

Under the Tokugawa shogunate, the castle became the headquarters of Ise-Kameyama Domain, and the surrounding castle town prospered as a post station on the Tōkaidō highway connecting Edo with Kyoto.

In 1632, while under control of the Miyake clan, the tenshu was demolished in error by Horio Torizane, who had confused ambiguously-worded orders by the shogunate with a command to rebuild the keep of Kameyama Castle in Tanba Province. Despite the error, the shogunate refused permission to rebuild the tenshu. Kameyama Castle served as a lodging facility for visits by the shoguns Tokugawa Ieyasu, Tokugawa Hidetada, and Tokugawa Iemitsu when making formal visits to the Imperial Court in Kyoto. A specially-constructed palace was built in the main enclosure for the exclusive use of the Shogun, and the daimyō of the castle was forced to reside in the Ni-no-Maru Second Bailey.

In 1636, Honda Toshitsugu received permission to build a yagura on the raised base of the former tenshu. Named the "Tamon-yagura", this is one of the few surviving structures of the castle and was declared a historic site by the prefectural government in 1953. In 1873, as per government decrees following the Meiji Restoration, most of the remaining castle structures were demolished. One survivor is the entrance to the Ni-no-maru daimyō residence, which is incorporated into the main hall of the temple of Tensho-ji in the Nishimachi neighborhood of Kameyama.

Aside from the Tamon-yagura, only the ruins of the 15-meter-high walls remain. A Buddhist temple of recent origin, Ōmoto-ji, and the Kameyama City History Museum stand on the grounds. Since 2001, the "Kameyama Castle Cherry Blossom Festival" has been held in the grounds annually. From 2006, as part of the Kameyama Castle area conservation and maintenance project, the Ni-no-maru enclosure and the surrounding area (including the Tamon-yagura) were restored to the state of the end of the Edo period. Restoration work was completed in 2013.

The castle is a ten-minute walk north of JR Kameyama Station (Kansai Main Line / Kisei Main Line).

== Literature ==
- De Lange, William (2021). An Encyclopedia of Japanese Castles. Groningen: Toyo Press. pp. 600 pages. ISBN 978-9492722300.
- Schmorleitz, Morton S. (1974). Castles in Japan. Tokyo: Charles E. Tuttle Co. pp. 144–145. ISBN 0-8048-1102-4.
- Motoo, Hinago (1986). Japanese Castles. Tokyo: Kodansha. ISBN 0-87011-766-1.
- Mitchelhill, Jennifer (2004). Castles of the Samurai: Power and Beauty. Tokyo: Kodansha. ISBN 4-7700-2954-3.
- Turnbull, Stephen (2003). Japanese Castles 1540–1640. Osprey Publishing. ISBN 1-84176-429-9.
