= Ise-Kameyama Domain =

Edo-period feudal domain in Japan

Ise-Kameyama Domain 伊勢亀山藩
- under Tokugawa shogunate Japan
- 1601–1871
- Capital: Ise-Kameyama Castle
- Area
  - Coordinates: 34°51′22.13″N 136°27′2.13″E
  - Type: Daimyō
- Historical era: Edo period
  - Established: 1601
  - Disestablished: 1871
- Today part of: part of Mie Prefecture

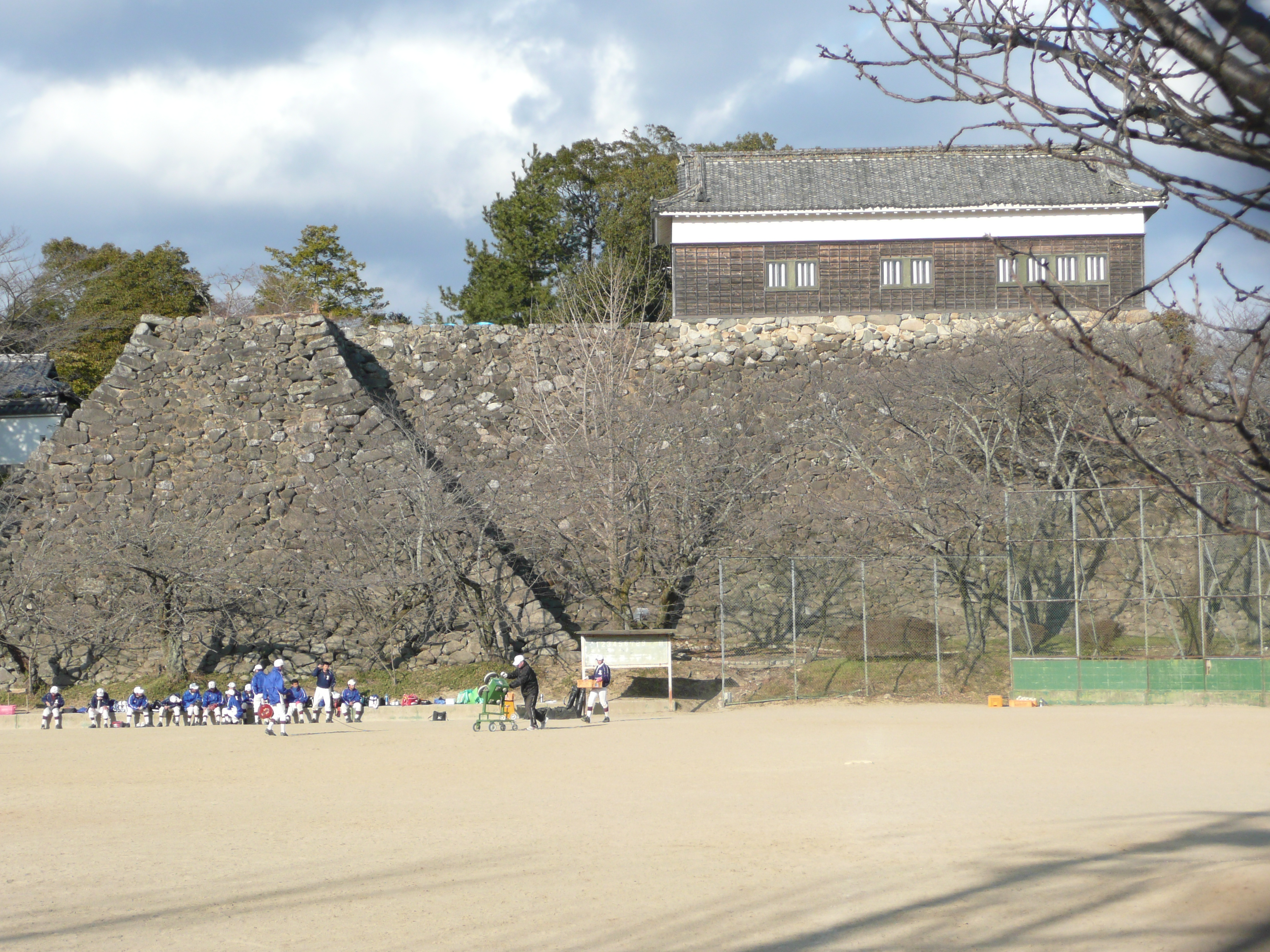
Ise-Kameyama Castle

Ise-Kamayama Domain (伊勢亀山藩, Ise-Kamayama-han) was a feudal domain under the Tokugawa shogunate of Edo period Japan, located in Ise Province in what is part of now modern-day Kameyama, Mie. It was centered around Ise-Kameyama Castle. Ise-Kameyama Domain was controlled by fudai daimyō clans throughout most its history.

== History ==
The Ise-Kamayama area of northern Ise Province was controlled in the Sengoku period by Seki Morinobu. Under Toyotomi Hideyoshi, his son Seki Kazumasa was relocated to Mino Province and replaced by Hideyoshi's general Okamoto Yoshikatsu as part of a 22,000 koku fief. Okamoto Yoshikatsu rebuilt Kameyama Castle and laid out the foundations for the castle town. However, he sided with the pro-Toyotomi Western Army at the 1600 Battle of Sekigahara and was dispossessed by the victorious Tokugawa Ieyasu, who restored Seki Kazumasa to his former domains with an increase in kokudaka to 30,000 koku. Under Seki Kazumasa, Kameyama-juku, the post station on the Tōkaidō was repaired and expanded. He was transferred to Kurosaka Domain in Hōki Province in 1611.The domain was assigned to Matsudaira Tadaaki from the Okudaira-branch of the Matsudaira clan until 1615, when he was transferred to Settsu Province in the wake of the Siege of Osaka and final downfall of the Toyotomi clan. Ise-Kameyama Domain briefly reverted to tenryō status and was administered by a daikan sent from Tsu Domain.

The domain was revived in 1620, when Miyake Yasunobu was transferred from Koromo Domain. Kameyama would continue to be ruled by a rapid succession of fudai daimyō clans until the Meiji restoration. In 1636, the Miyake were replaced by a cadet branch of the Honda clan, who were in turn replaced by the Ishikawa clan in 1651, the Itakura clan in 1669, and the Ogyū-Matsudaira in 1710. The Itakura clan returned in 1717, only to be replaced by the Ishikawa clan again in 1744. The Ishikawa would continue to rule Kameyama until the end of the Tokugawa shogunate, bringing some measure of political stability. However, the domain suffered financially from repeated natural disasters and crop failures. Efforts at reform by the fourth daimyō, Ishikawa Fusahiro, were met with widespread opposition leading to large-scale peasant's uprisings in 1768. Efforts made by his successors to introduce tea cultivation and sericulture were more successful. During the Boshin War, s with many domains, the samurai of the domain were divided between a pro-sonnō jōi faction who favored a restoration of political power to the Emperor of Japan and a stronger foreign policy, and a pro-status quo faction still loyal to the Tokugawa shogunate. IHowever, due to early military victories by the imperial side, the domain, together with neighboring Toba Domain pledged fealty to the new Meiji government and sent troops to fight against the pro-Tokugawa remnants in eastern and northern Japan. As with all domains, Ise-Kamayema Domain was abolished in the 1871 abolition of the han system.

== Holdings at the end of the Edo period ==
As with most domains in the han system, Ise-Kameyama Domain consisted of several discontinuous territories calculated to provide the assigned kokudaka, based on periodic cadastral surveys and projected agricultural yields.

- Ise Province
  - 5 villages in Mie District
  - 5 villages in Kawawa District
  - 74 villages in Suzuka District
- Bitchū Province
  - 3 villages in Aga District
  - 3 villages in Jōbō District

== List of daimyō ==
#	Name	Tenure	Courtesy title	Court Rank	kokudaka
Seki clan, 1600–1610 (tozama)
1	Seki Kazumasa (関一政)	1600–1610	Nagato-no-kami (長門守)	Junior 5th Rank, Lower Grade (従五位下)	30,000 koku
Okudaira clan, 1610–1615 (fudai)
1	Matsudaira Tadaaki (松平忠明)	1610–1615	Shimōsa-no-kami (下総守)	Junior 4th Rank, Lower Grade (従四位下)	50,000 koku
tenryō 1615–1620
Miyake clan, 1620–1636 (fudai)
1	Miyake Yasunobu (三宅康信)	1620–1621	Echigō-no-kami (越後守)	Junior 5th Rank, Lower Grade (従五位下)	10,000 ->12,000 koku
2	Miyake Yasumori (三宅康盛)	1621–1636	Daizen-no-suke (大膳亮)	Junior 5th Rank, Lower Grade (従五位下)	12,000 koku
Honda clan, 1636–1651 (fudai)
1	Honda Toshitsugu (本多俊次)	1636–1651	Shimōsa-no-kami (下総守)	Junior 5th Rank, Lower Grade (従五位下)	50,000 koku
Ishikawa clan, 1651–1669 (fudai)
1	Ishikawa Noriyuki (石川憲之)	1651–1669	Tonomo-no-kami (主殿頭)	Junior 5th Rank, Lower Grade (従五位下)	50,000 koku
Itakura clan, 1669–1710 (fudai)
1	Itakura Shigetsune (板倉重常)	1669–1688	Oki-no-kami (隠岐守)	Junior 5th Rank, Lower Grade (従五位下)	50,000 koku
2	Itakura Shigefuyu (板倉重冬)	1688–1709	Suo-no-kami (周防守)	Junior 5th Rank, Lower Grade (従五位下)	50,000 koku
3	Itakura Shigeharu (板倉重治)	1709–1710	Omi-no-kami (近江守)	Junior 5th Rank, Lower Grade (従五位下)	50,000 koku
Ogyū-Matsudaira clan, 1710–1717 (fudai)
1	Matsudaira Norisato (松平乗邑)	1710–1717	Sakone-no-shōgen (左近衛将監); Jijū (侍従)	Junior 4th Rank, Lower Grade (従四位下)	60,000 koku
Itakura clan, 1669–1710 (fudai)
1	Itakura Shigeharu (板倉重治)	1717–1724	Omi-no-kami (近江守)	Junior 5th Rank, Lower Grade (従五位下)	50,000 koku
2	Itakura Katsuzumi (板倉勝澄)	1724–1744	Omi-no-kami (近江守)	Junior 5th Rank, Lower Grade (従五位下)	50,000 koku
Ishikawa clan, 1744–1871 (fudai)
1	Ishikawa Fusayoshi (石川総慶)	1744–1764	Tonomo-no-kami (主殿頭)	Junior 5th Rank, Lower Grade (従五位下)	60,000 koku
2	Ishikawa Fusataka (石川総尭)	1764–1764	Tonomo-no-kami (主殿頭)	Junior 5th Rank, Lower Grade (従五位下)	60,000 koku
3	Ishikawa Fusazumi (石川純尭)	1764–1776	Hyūga-no-kami (日向守)	Junior 5th Rank, Lower Grade (従五位下)	60,000 koku
4	Ishikawa Fusahiro (石川総博)	1776–1796	Hyūga-no-kami (日向守)	Junior 5th Rank, Lower Grade (従五位下)	60,000 koku
5	Ishikawa Fusanori (石川総師)	1796–1803	Tonomo-no-kami (主殿頭)	Junior 5th Rank, Lower Grade (従五位下)	60,000 koku
6	Ishikawa Fusasuke (石川総佐)	1803–1820	Tonomo-no-kami (主殿頭)	Junior 5th Rank, Lower Grade (従五位下)	60,000 koku
7	Ishikawa Fusayasu (石川総安)	1820–1833	Tonomo-no-kami (主殿頭)	Junior 5th Rank, Lower Grade (従五位下)	60,000 koku
8	Ishikawa Fusanori (石川総紀)	1833–1853	Hyūga-no-kami (日向守)	Junior 5th Rank, Lower Grade (従五位下)	60,000 koku
9	Ishikawa Fusayoshi (石川総禄)	1853–1862	Tonomo-no-kami (主殿頭)	Junior 5th Rank, Lower Grade (従五位下)	60,000 koku
10	Ishikawa Fusanobu (石川総脩)	1862–1865	-none-	-none-	60,000 koku
11	Ishikawa Nariyuki (石川成之)	1865–1871	Hyūga-no-kami (日向守)	Junior 5th Rank, Lower Grade (従五位下)	60,000 koku

== See also ==
- List of Han
- Abolition of the han system
