= Nishi-Meihan Expressway =

National expressway in Osaka and Nara Prefectures, Japan

Nishi-Meihan Expressway
- 西名阪自動車道

Route information
- Length: 27.2 km (16.9 mi)
- Existed: 1969–present

Major junctions
- From: Matsubara Junction
- To: Tenri Interchange

Location
- Country: Japan
- Major cities: Fujiidera, Kashiwara, Kashiba, Yamatokōriyama

Highway system
- National highways of Japan; Expressways of Japan

Nishi-Meihan Expressway (西名阪自動車道, Nishimeihan Jidōshadō) is a national expressway in the Kinki region of Japan. It is owned and operated by West Nippon Expressway Company.

== Naming ==
Meihan is a kanji acronym of two characters. The first character represents Nagoya (名古屋) and the second character represents Osaka (大阪). Nishi (西) means west; together with the Meihan Expressway and Higashi-Meihan Expressway, it forms a corridor linking the greater Nagoya and Osaka areas.

== Passage cities ==
- Osaka Prefecture

Matsubara - Fujiidera - Habikino - Kashiwara

- Nara Prefecture

Kashiba - Kanmaki - Kawai - Ando - Yamatokōriyama - Ando - Yamatokōriyama - Tenri

== Interchange list ==
Prefecture	Location	km	mi	Exit	Name	Destinations	Notes
Osaka	Matsubara	0.0	0.0	10	Matsubara	Hanwa Expressway / Kinki Expressway – Wakayama, Suita, Sakai, Higashiosaka; Matsubara Route – Osaka City	Expressway continues as the Matsubara Route
Osaka	Fujiidera			Matsubara Toll Gate (western terminus of ticketed system only for outbound (eastbound))			
Osaka	Fujiidera	3.1	1.9	1	Fujiidera	Osaka Prefecture Route 12 – Fujiidera, Kashiwaraseibu (Izumisano, Kashiwara, Matsubara)	Toll entrance only.
Osaka	Kashiwara			Kashiwara Toll Gate (western terminus of ticketed system only for inbound (westbound))			
Osaka	Kashiwara	8.1	5.0	2	Kashiwara	National Route 165 – Kashiwara, Yamatotakada (Sakurai, Kashihara, Yao, Osaka)	Outbound (eastbound) exit and inbound (westbound) entrance.
Osaka	Kashiwara			Kashiwara Tunnel			
Nara	Kashiba				Tajiri Tunnel		
Nara	Kashiba	11.5	7.1	Kashiba Service Area			
Nara	Kashiba	12.6	7.8	3	Kashiba	奈良県道54号標識 Nara Prefecture Route 54 to National Route 168 – Kashiba, Oji, Shigisan	
Nara	Kawai	18.0	11.2	4	Horyuji	奈良県道5号標識 Nara Prefecture Route 5 – Horyuji, Yamatotakada, Shigisan	Toll outbound (eastbound) exit and inbound (westbound) entrance only.
Nara	Ando	21.2	13.2	4-1	Yamato-Mahoroba	奈良県道108号標識 Nara Prefecture Route 108 – National Route 25 (Ando, Kawanishi, Ikoma)	Toll outbound (eastbound) exit and inbound (westbound) entrance only; ETC only (Smart interchange)
Nara	Yamatokōriyama	23.4	14.5	4-2	Koriyama-shimotsumichi	Keinawa Expressway – Nara City, Kashihara	Toll outbound (eastbound) exit and inbound (westbound) entrance.
Nara	Yamatokōriyama	24.3	15.1	5	Koriyama	National Route 24 (Wakayama, Kashihara, Kyoto, Nara)	Toll outbound (eastbound) exit and inbound (westbound) entrance only.
Nara	Yamatokōriyama			Tenri Parking Area (outbound (eastbound))			
Nara	Yamatokōriyama	25.3	15.7	Tenri Toll Gate (eastern terminus of ticketed system)			
Nara	Yamatokōriyama			Tenri Parking Area (inbound (westbound))			
Nara	Tenri	27.2	16.9	6	Tenri	National Route 169 – Tenri, Nara, Sakurai; Meihan Expressway	Expressway continues as the Meihan Expressway. Signed as exit 29 for westbound exit and eastbound entrance.
1.000 mi = 1.609 km; 1.000 km = 0.621 mi: Electronic toll collection; Incomplete access; Tolled
