= Japan National Route 163 =

Road in Japan

National Route 163
- 国道163号
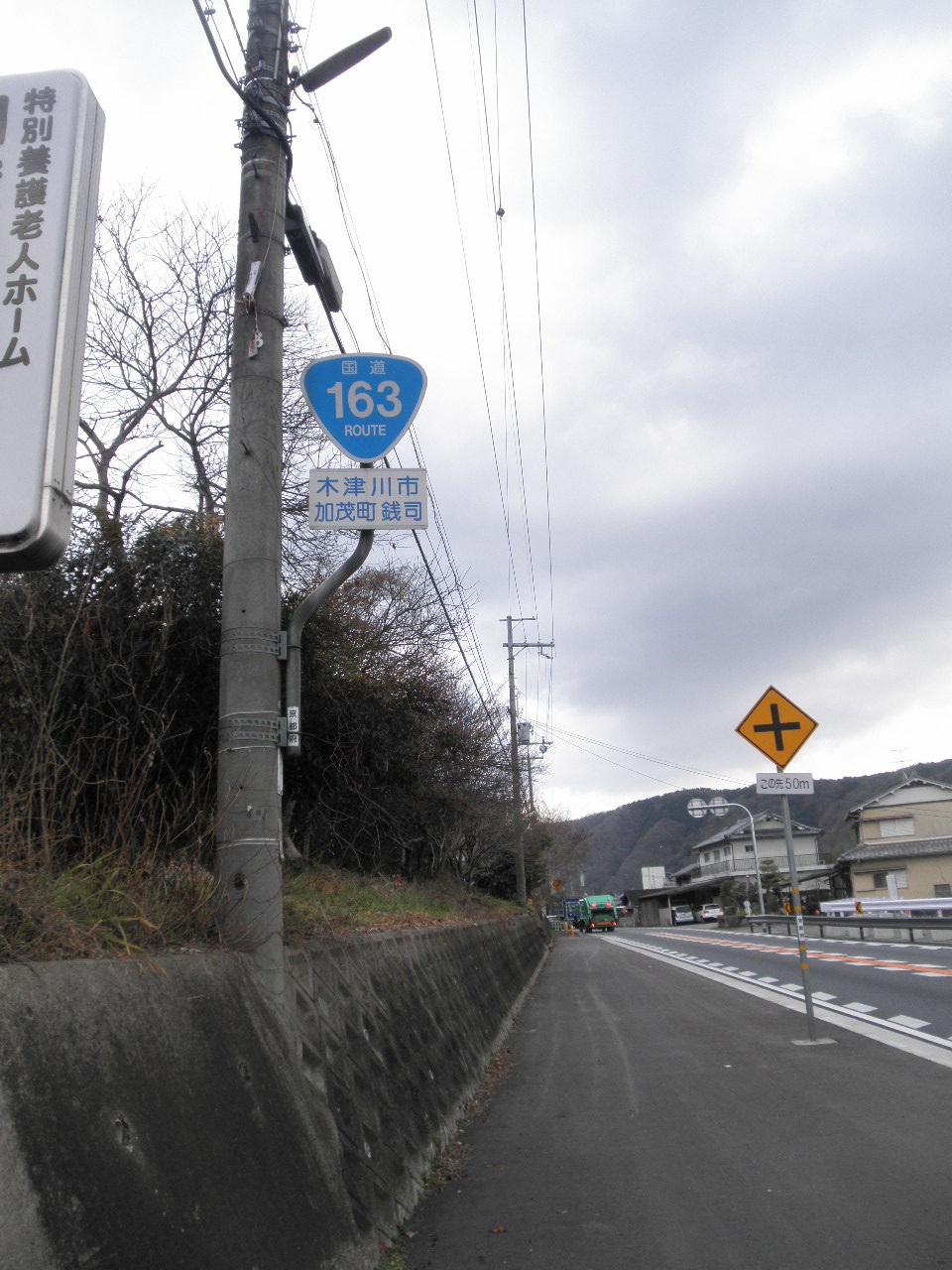

Route information
- Length: 124.6 km (77.4 mi)
- Existed: 18 May 1953–present

Major junctions
- West end: National Route 1 / National Route 2 / National Route 25 / National Route 176 in Kita-ku, Osaka
- East end: National Route 23 in Tsu, Mie

Location
- Country: Japan

Highway system
- National highways of Japan; Expressways of Japan
← National Route 162	→ National Route 164

National Route 163 is a national highway of Japan connecting Kita-ku, Osaka and Tsu, Mie in Japan, with a total length of 124.6 km (77.42 mi).

== History ==
Route 163 was designated on 18 May 1953 from Osaka to Yokkaichi. On 1 April 1963 the section from Iga to Yokkaichi was redesignated as a portion of Route 25.
