= Sakashita-juku =

Forty-eighth of the 53 stations of the Tōkaidō

Sakashita-juku 坂下宿
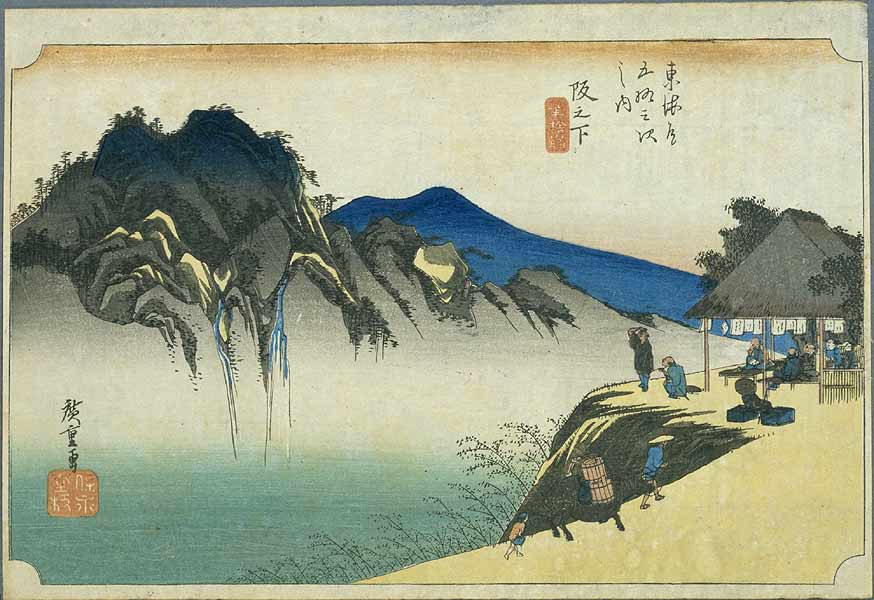
- Hiroshige's print of Sakashita-juku, part of the Hōeidō edition The Fifty-three Stations of the Tōkaidō series

General information
- Location: Kameyama, Mie (former Ise Province); Japan
- Coordinates: 34°53′18.66″N 136°21′15.87″E
- Elevation: 203 m (666 ft)
- System: post station
- Line: Tōkaidō
- Distance: 423.4 km from Edo
Location
- Location within Mie Prefecture Location within Japan

Sakashita-juku (坂下宿, Sakashita-juku) was the forty-eighth of the fifty-three stations (shukuba) of the Tōkaidō connecting Edo with Kyoto in Edo period Japan. It was located in former Ise Province in what is now the Sakashita neighborhood of the city of Kameyama, Mie Prefecture, Japan.

== History ==
Sakashita-juku is located on the main route from Kyoto to the Ise Grand Shrine, and developed from the Heian period as a good location for travelers to pause before attempting the steep Suzuka Pass. During the Kamakura period, traffic on the road between Kyoto and Kamakura increased, not only for samurai, but also for merchants and priests. In the early Edo period, the system of post stations on the Tōkaidō was formalized by the Tokugawa shogunate in 1601, Sakashita-juku became an official post station. It was on the sankin-kōtai route by many western daimyō to-and-from the Shogun's court in Edo. The original site of Sakashita-juku was located very close to the entrance of the pass and was destroyed by a landslide in 1650. It was relocated approximately 1.3 kilometers to the east, in its present location.

Per the 1843 "東海道宿村大概帳" (Tōkaidō Shukuson Taigaichō) guidebook issued by the Inspector of Highways (道中奉行, Dōchu-būgyō), the town had a population of 500 in 150 houses, including three honjin, one wakihonjin, and 51 hatago. It had one Tonyaba, for the stabling of packhorses and warehousing of goods, and one kōsatsu for the display of official notifications. It was 423.4 kilometers from Edo.

However, the Suzuka Pass was also the reason for the post town's decline in the Meiji period; the pass was too steep for rail lines to be laid, so the new Tōkaidō Main Line railway was routed to the west, through Tsuge Station (present-day Iga), bypassing the formerly flourishing town. Today, there are only a few private residences left at the site of the former post station, as well as very little historical architecture. The only thing that marks the former site is a stone marker built by the former town of Seki, now part of the city of Kameyama.

== Sakashita-juku in The Fifty-three Stations of the Tōkaidō ==
Utagawa Hiroshige's ukiyo-e Hōeidō edition print of Sakashita-juku dates from 1833 -1834. The print does not depicts the post station at all, but instead shows an open teahouse, looking across a ravine to the blue heights of the Mount Fudesute in the Suzuka Mountains. According to folklore, during the Muromachi period, when the famed painter Kanō Motonobu attempted to paint this mountain with its landscape of strongly-shaped rocks and groves of maple, pine and azaleas, the shifting light caused by clouds and haze caused him to throw down his paintbrush in frustration. The view of the mountain was a famed scenic spot in Edo period guidebooks, and the tea house within Suzuka Pass with a view of the mountain was a popular resting place for travelers.

== Neighboring post towns ==
Tōkaidō
Seki-juku - Sakashita-juku - Tsuchiyama-juku
