= Suzuka Barrier =

- 鈴鹿関 (Japanese)
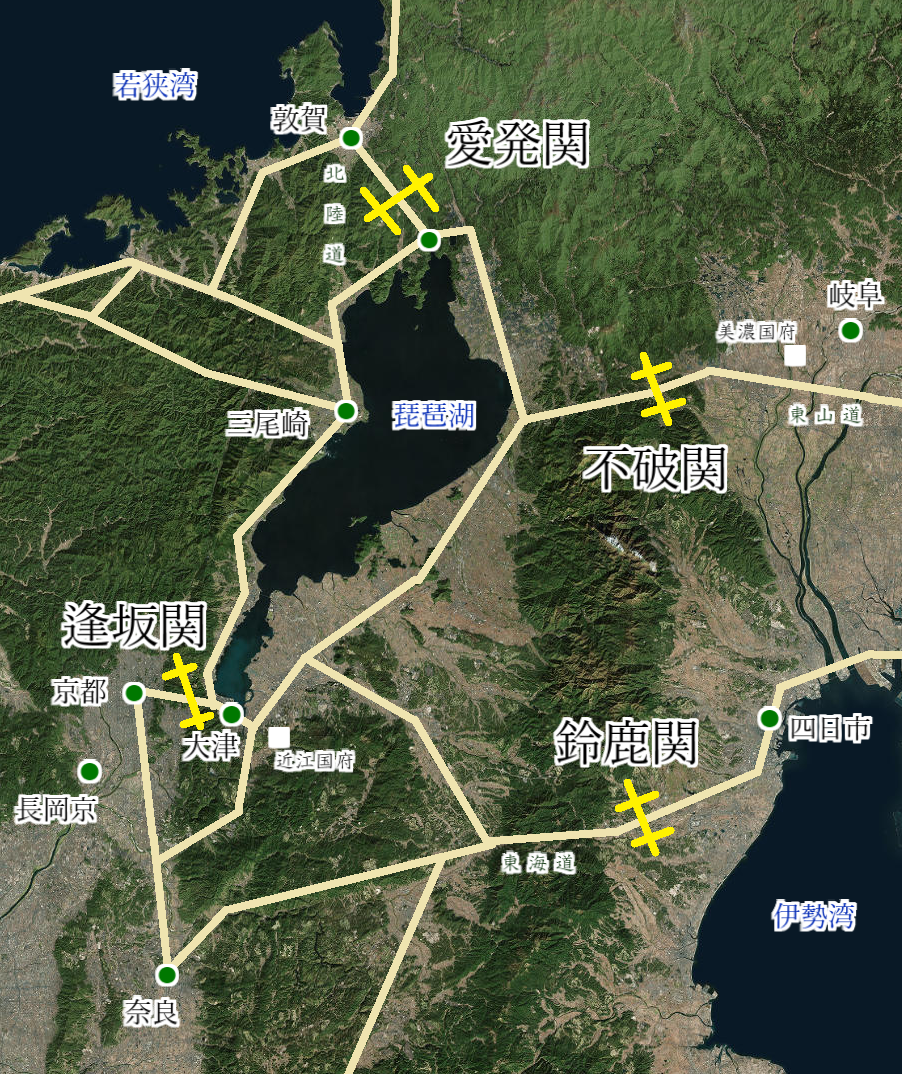
- The Three Ancient Barriers, Suzuka Barrier is in then lower right corner

- Suzuka Barrier Suzuka Barrier (Japan)
- 34°51′27″N 136°22′54″E
- Periods: Asuka-Nara period
- Location: Kameyama, Mie, Japan
- Region: Kansai region

History
- Built: 701 AD
- Abandoned: 789 AD

Site notes
- Public access: Yes (no public facilities)

The Suzuka Barrier (鈴鹿関, Suzuka no Seki) was a security checkpoint established during the Nara period on the ancient Tōkaidō highway connecting the capitals of Heijō-kyō and Heian-kyō with the eastern provinces of Japan. Along with Arachi Barrier (愛発関, Arachi no Seki) in what is now Tsuruga, Fukui and Fuwa Barrier (不破関, Fuwa no Seki) in what is now Sekigahara, Gifu, it was one of the three ancient barriers controlling ingress into the Kinai region from the east. In 1921, the ruins of the Suzuka Barrier was recognized as a National Historic Site

== Overview ==
The three barriers were established in the first or second year of the reign of Emperor Tenmu. During the Jinshin War, he had gained an important military advantage over his brother by seizing control of these access points to the capital, and thus understood the strategic importances of these choke points. The Taihō Code in 701AD stipulated that barriers should have both police and military functions. Each was equipped with a garrison and armory, and was placed under the control of a kuge military officer with fourth Court Rank. The purpose of the barrier was not only to prevent invasion from the east, but was also to prevent any rebels from escaping the capital, The barriers were highly closed during times of potential political unrest, such as the illness or death of an emperor. The first time the barrier was actually closed was during the interregnum following the death of Empress Genmei in 722 AD. Other times included the rebellion of Prince Nagaya, the Fujiwara no Nakamaro Rebellion and Kusuko Incident. On the transfer of the capital to Heian-kyō in 789AD, Emperor Kanmu ordered the barriers to be abolished. However, although the troops were withdrawn, the barriers continued to exist, and closures of the gate are recorded at several times well into the middle of the Heian period.

The Suzuka Barrier guarded the pass between Iga Province and Ise Province on the main route between Heijō-kyō and the Ise Grand Shrine. In 794 AD, Emperor Kanmu ordered the construction of a new road connecting Heian-kyō with the Saiō complex in Ise via the Suzuka Pass. Construction was difficult, and the road was not completed until 886 AD under Emperor Kōkō. The ancient route was lost, and for many years the predominant theory was that the Edo period post station of Seki-juku on the Tōkaidō was the location of the ancient barrier. However, following the discovery of Nara period roof tiles in 2005, portions of a moated enclosure with earthen ramparts were discovered at the present location corresponding to a possible site of the ancient Suzuka Barrier. Archaeological excavations are ongoing and have thus far revealed the existence of a wall with a height of three meters extending 650 meters from north-to-south.

== See also ==
- List of Historic Sites of Japan (Mie)
