= Ise Expressway =

National expressway in Mie Prefecture, Japan

Ise Expressway
- 伊勢自動車道

Route information
- Length: 67.7 km (42.1 mi)
- Existed: 1975–present

Major junctions
- From: Ise-Seki Interchange; Meihan Expressway in Tsu, Mie
- To: Ise Interchange; Ise Futami Toba Toll Road; National Route 23 in Ise, Mie

Location
- Country: Japan
- Major cities: Tsu, Matsusaka

Highway system
- National highways of Japan; Expressways of Japan

The Ise Expressway (伊勢自動車道, Ise Jidōshadō) is a national expressway in Mie Prefecture, Japan. It is owned and operated by Central Nippon Expressway Company. 近畿自動車道伊勢線

== Overview ==
Officially, the route is designated as the Kinki Expressway Ise Route (近畿自動車道伊勢線), however this designation does not appear on any signage.

The expressway runs from north to south through central Mie Prefecture, beginning at a junction with the Meihan National Highway. It passes to the west of the cities of Tsu and Matsusaka before coming to a junction with the Kisei Expressway. Here the Ise Expressway turns east and eventually terminates in the city of Ise. From the terminus the Ise Futami Toba Toll Road continues east on the same roadway.

The first section was opened to traffic in 1975. Direct access to the Higashi-Meihan Expressway was established in 2005. Prior to the completion of this junction users could only travel between the two expressways via the Meihan Highway.

The exit numbering system is continuous with the Higashi-Meihan. The entire route is 4 lanes with the exception of the short (1.8 km) section between Ise-nishi Interchange and Ise Interchange.

== List of interchanges and features ==
- IC - interchange, JCT - junction, PA - parking area, SA - service area, TB - toll gate, TN - tunnel, BR - bridge

No.	Name	Connections	Dist. from Origin	Dist. from Terminus	Notes	Location (all in Mie)
Through to Higashi-Meihan Expressway
34	Ise-Seki IC	Meihan National Highway	0.0	67.7	Ise-Seki IC ←→ Higashi-Meihan: No Access	Tsu
35	Geinō IC	Pref. Route 10 (Tsu Seki Route)	5.2	62.5		Tsu
SA	Anō SA		8.7	59.0		Tsu
36	Tsu IC	Pref. Route 42 (Tsu Geinō Ōyamada Route)	13.7	54.0		Tsu
BR	Anōgawa Overpass		↓	↑		Tsu
BR	Iwatagawa Overpass		↓	↑		Tsu
37	Hisai IC	National Route 165	20.0	47.7		Tsu
BR	Kumozugawa Bridge		↓	↑		Tsu
37-1	Ichishi-Ureshino IC	Pref. Route 67 (Ichishi-Ureshino Route)	25.8	41.9		Matsusaka
PA	Ureshino PA		28.3	39.4		Matsusaka
38	Matsusaka IC	Pref. Route 58 (Matsusaka Ichishi Route); Pref. Route 59 (Matsusaka Daini Kanjō Route)	32.2	35.5		Matsusaka
TN	Matsusaka Tunnel		↓	↑	Length - 919 m	Matsusaka
BR	Kushidagawa Bridge		↓	↑		Matsusaka
TN	Taki Tunnel		↓	↑	Length - 700 m	Taki
39-1	Seiwa-Taki JCT	Kisei Expressway	46.1	21.6		Taki
39	Seiwa-Taki IC	National Route 42	46.1	21.6		Taki
PA	Taki PA		52.0 (52.3)	(15.7); 15.4		Taki
40	Tamaki IC	Pref. Route 65 (Watarai Tamaki Route)	56.4	11.3		Tamaki
BR	Miyagawa Bridge		↓	↑		Tamaki
BR	Miyagawa Bridge		↓	↑		Ise
TB	Ise Toll Gate		↓	↑		Ise
41	Ise-nishi IC	Pref. Route 32 (Ise Isobe Route)	65.9	1.8	Ise-bound exit, Tsu-bound entrance only	Ise
TN	Ise Tunnel		↓	↑	Length - 70 m	Ise
42	Ise IC	National Route 23	67.7	0.0		Ise
Through to Ise Futami Toba Toll Road
