= Seki-juku (Tōkaidō) =

Forty-seventh of the 53 stations of the Tōkaidō

Seki-juku 関宿
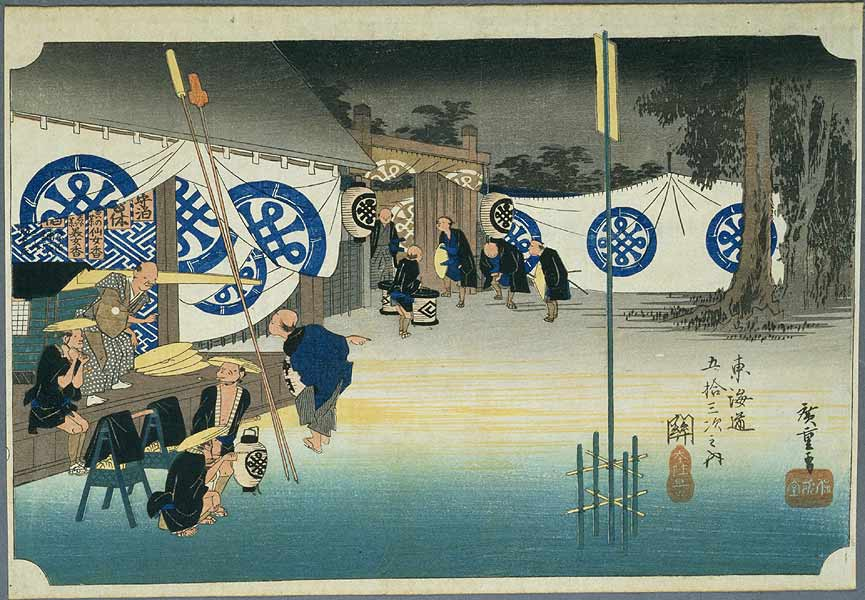
- Hiroshige's print of Seki-juku, part of the Hōeidō edition The Fifty-three Stations of the Tōkaidō series

General information
- Location: Kameyama, Mie (former Ise Province); Japan
- Coordinates: 34°51′5.99″N 136°24′1.27″E
- Elevation: 97 m (318 ft)
- System: post station
- Line: Tōkaidō
- Distance: 416.9 km from Edo
Location
- Location within Mie Prefecture Location within Japan

Seki-juku (関宿, Seki-juku) was the forty-seventh of the fifty-three stations of the Tōkaidō connecting Edo with Kyoto in Edo period Japan. It was located in former Ise Province in what is now the Seki neighborhood of the city of Kameyama, Mie Prefecture, Japan.

== History ==
Seki-juku is located on the main route from Kyoto to the Ise Grand Shrine, and was always a major intersection for travel, with the Isebetsu Kaidō (伊勢別街道), a highway for pilgrims to the Ise Grand Shrines and the Yamato Kaidō (大和街道), a highway for travelers to Yamato Province, intersecting here with the Tōkaidō highway. Although the theory that Seki-juku was the location of the ancient Suzuka Barrier, an administrative checkpoint on the highway controlling access to the capital from the eastern provinces, is no longer valid, the Suzuka Barrier was located nearby. From the Kamakura period, traffic on the road between Kyoto and Kamakura increased, not only for samurai, but also for merchants and priests. In the early Edo period, the system of post stations on the Tōkaidō was formalized by the Tokugawa shogunate in 1601, Seki-juku became an official post station It was on the sankin-kōtai route by many western daimyō to-and-from the Shogun's court in Edo.

Per the 1843 "東海道宿村大概帳" (Tōkaidō Shukuson Taigaichō) guidebook issued by the Inspector of Highways (道中奉行, Dōchu-būgyō), the town had 632 houses, including two honjin, two wakihonjin, and 42 hatago. It had one Tonyaba, for the stabling of packhorses and warehousing of goods, and one kōsatsu for the display of official notifications. It was 416.9 kilometers from Edo.

Following the Meiji Restoration, Seki-juku became the nucleus for the modern town of Seki, which became part of the city of Kameyama in 2005. Many of the historical buildings have been preserved and the area has been designated as Important Preservation District for Groups of Traditional Buildings.

== Gallery ==
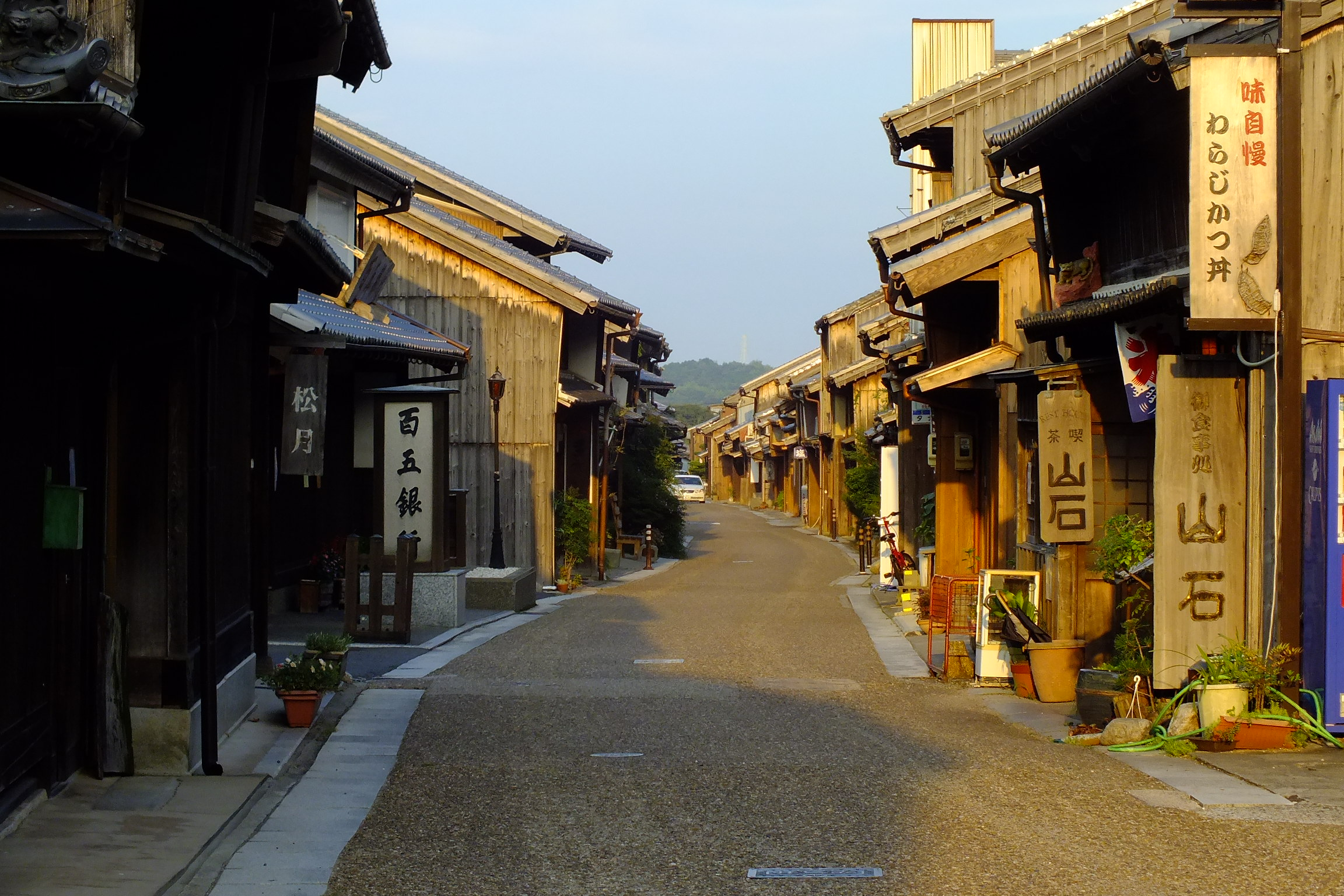
Seki-juku

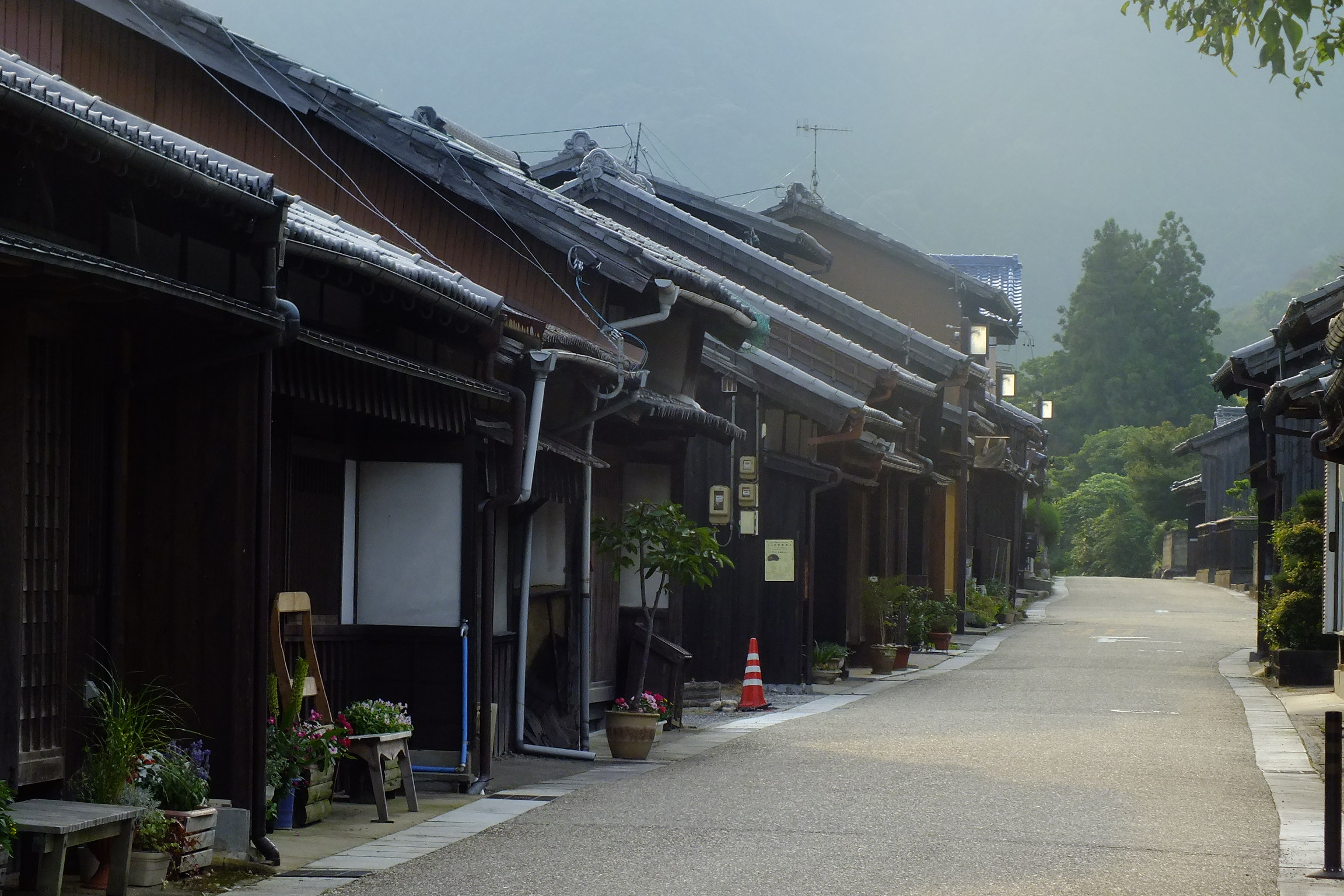
Historic Preservation Area of Seki-juku

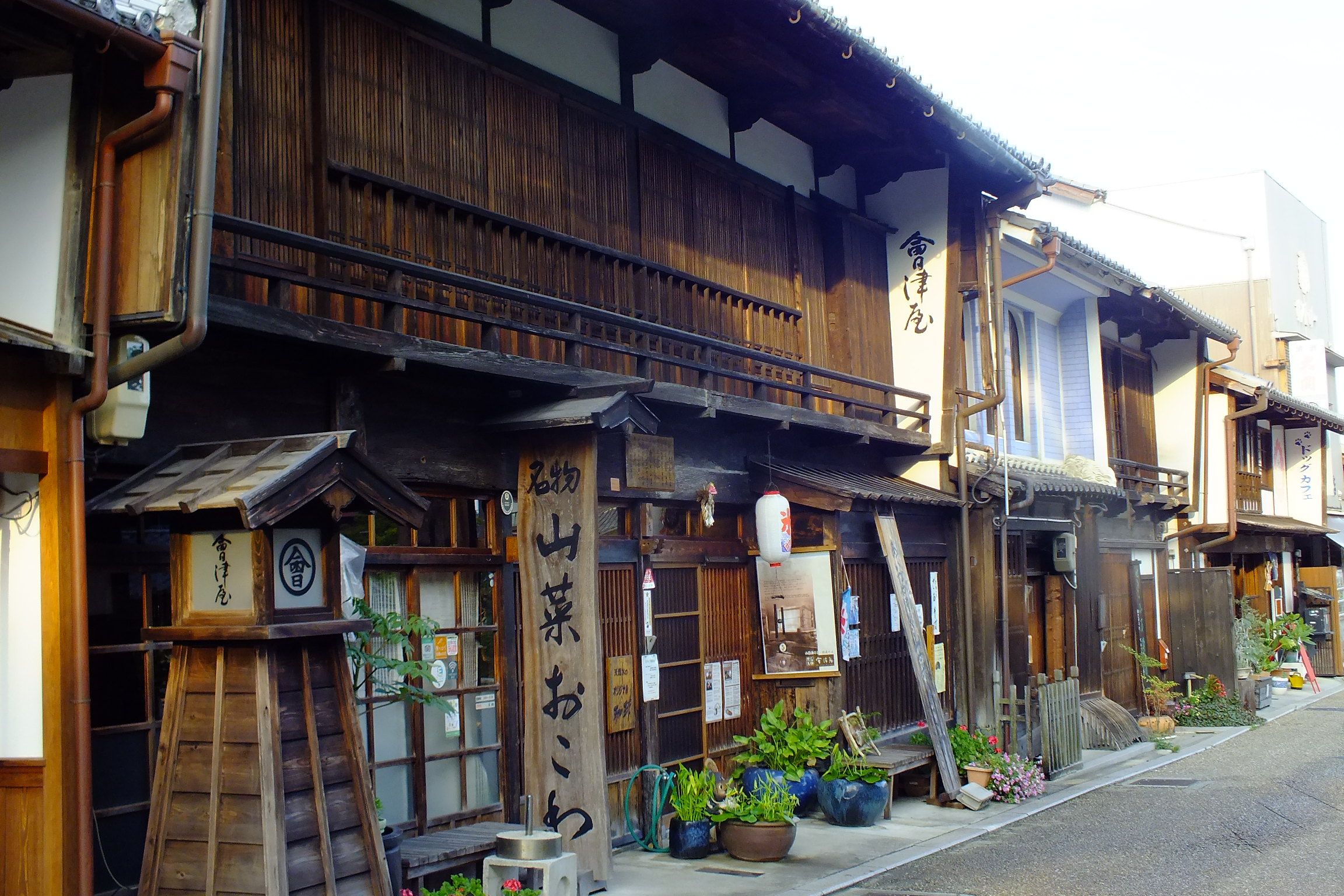
Aizu-ya shop in Seki-juku

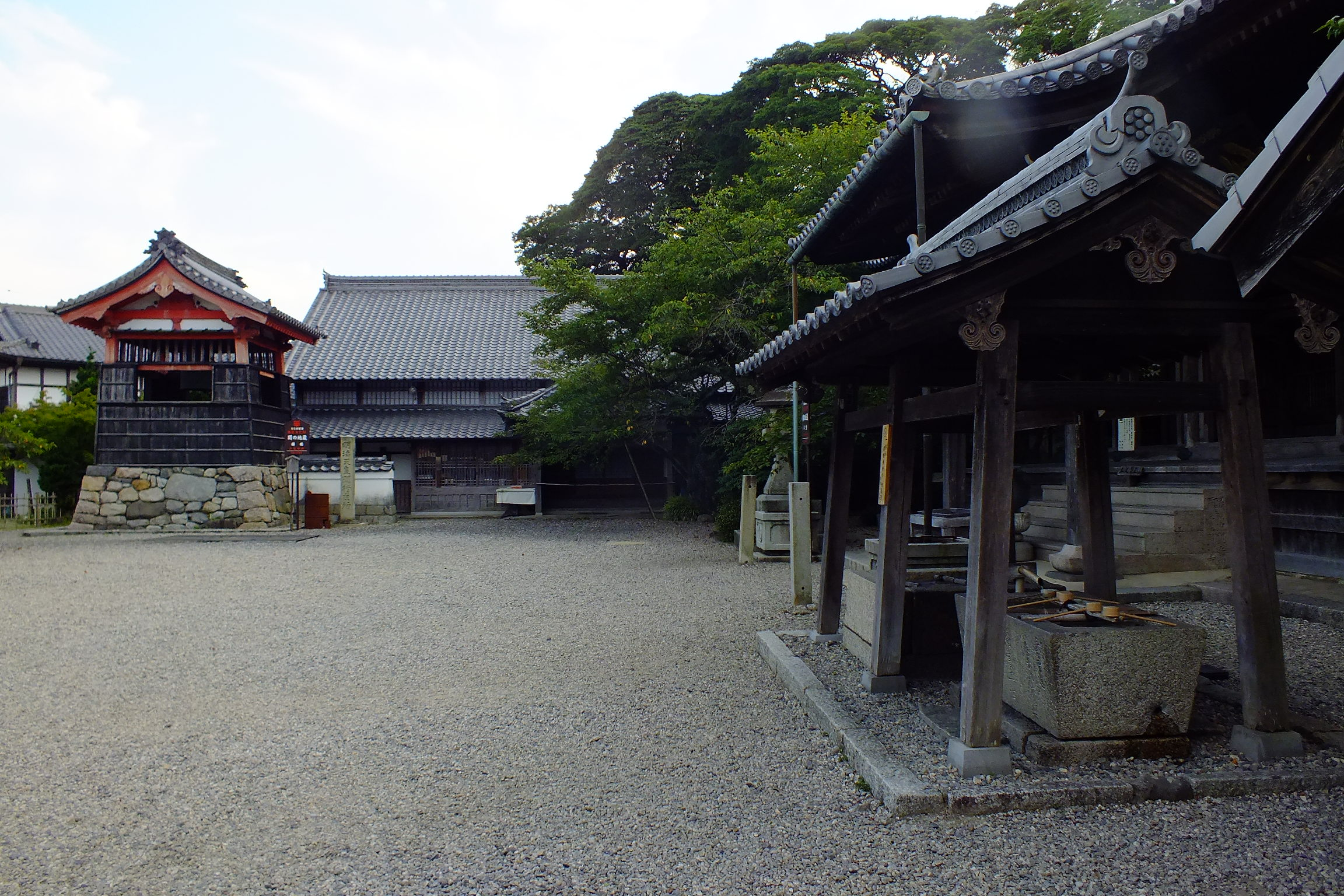
Jizo-in temple in Seki-juku

== Seki-juku in The Fifty-three Stations of the Tōkaidō ==
Utagawa Hiroshige's ukiyo-e Hōeidō edition print of Seki-juku dates from 1833 -1834. The print depicts the early morning preparations for departure of a daimyō procession on sankin-kōtai from one of the honjin. A number of lower-ranking retainers with long spears are tying their travel hats and sandals, while in the background, a number of higher ranking samurai with their two swords are waiting by the entrance for other members of the party to appear. The sky is still dark, and a number of chōchin travel lanterns are in evidence.

== Neighboring post towns ==
Tōkaidō
Kameyama-juku - Seki-juku - Sakashita-juku

== See also ==
- Groups of Traditional Buildings
