= Japan National Route 2 =

Road in Japan

National Route 2
- 国道2号
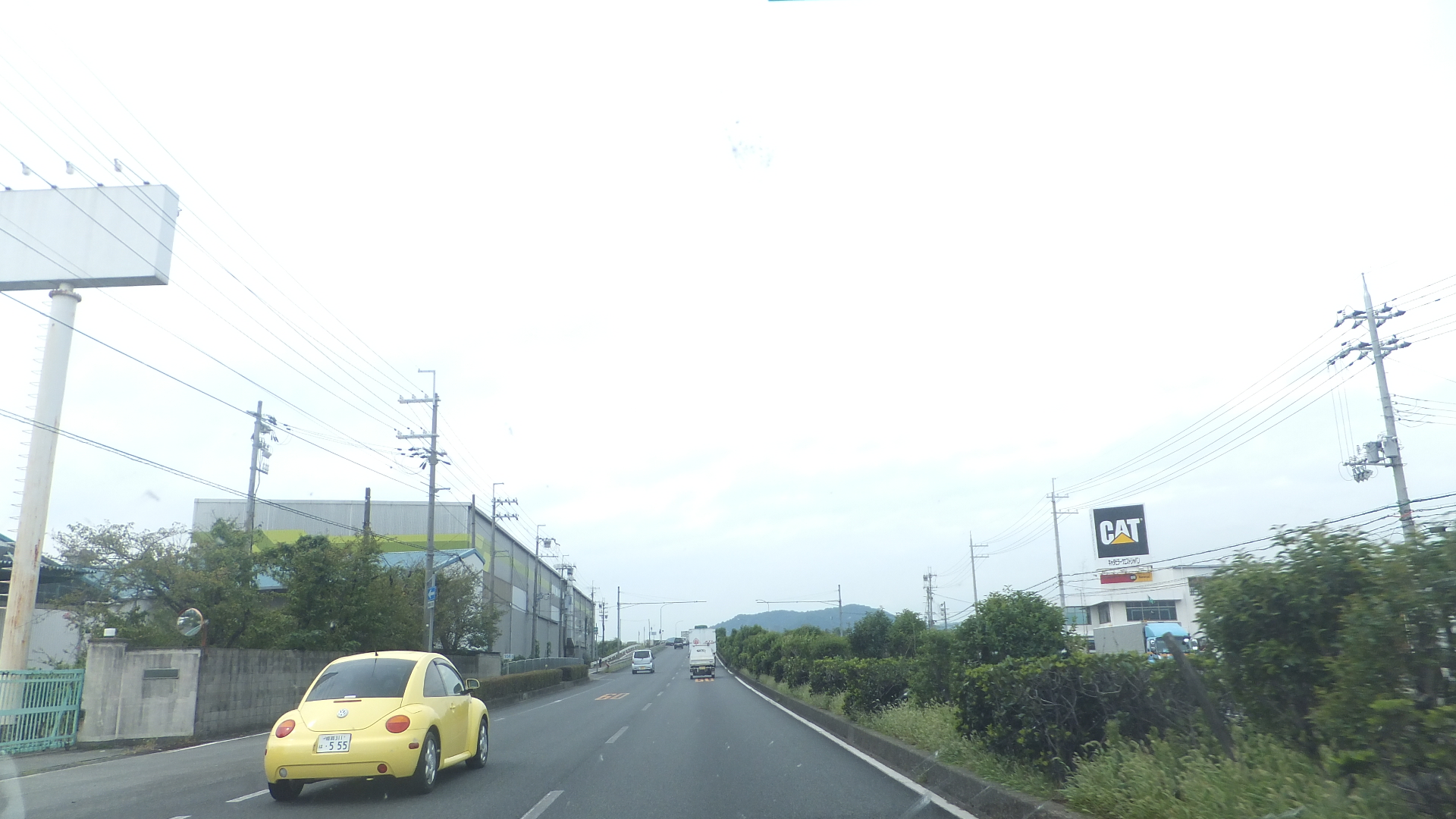

Route information
- Length: 533.2 km (331.3 mi)
- Existed: 4 December 1952–present

Major junctions
- East end: National Route 1 / National Route 25 / National Route 176 in Umeda, Kita-ku, Osaka
- National Route 43; National Route 28; National Route 29; National Route 30; National Route 31; National Route 54; National Route 9
- West end: National Route 3 / National Route 10 in Moji-ku, Kitakyushu

Location
- Country: Japan

Highway system
- National highways of Japan; Expressways of Japan
← National Route 1	→ National Route 3

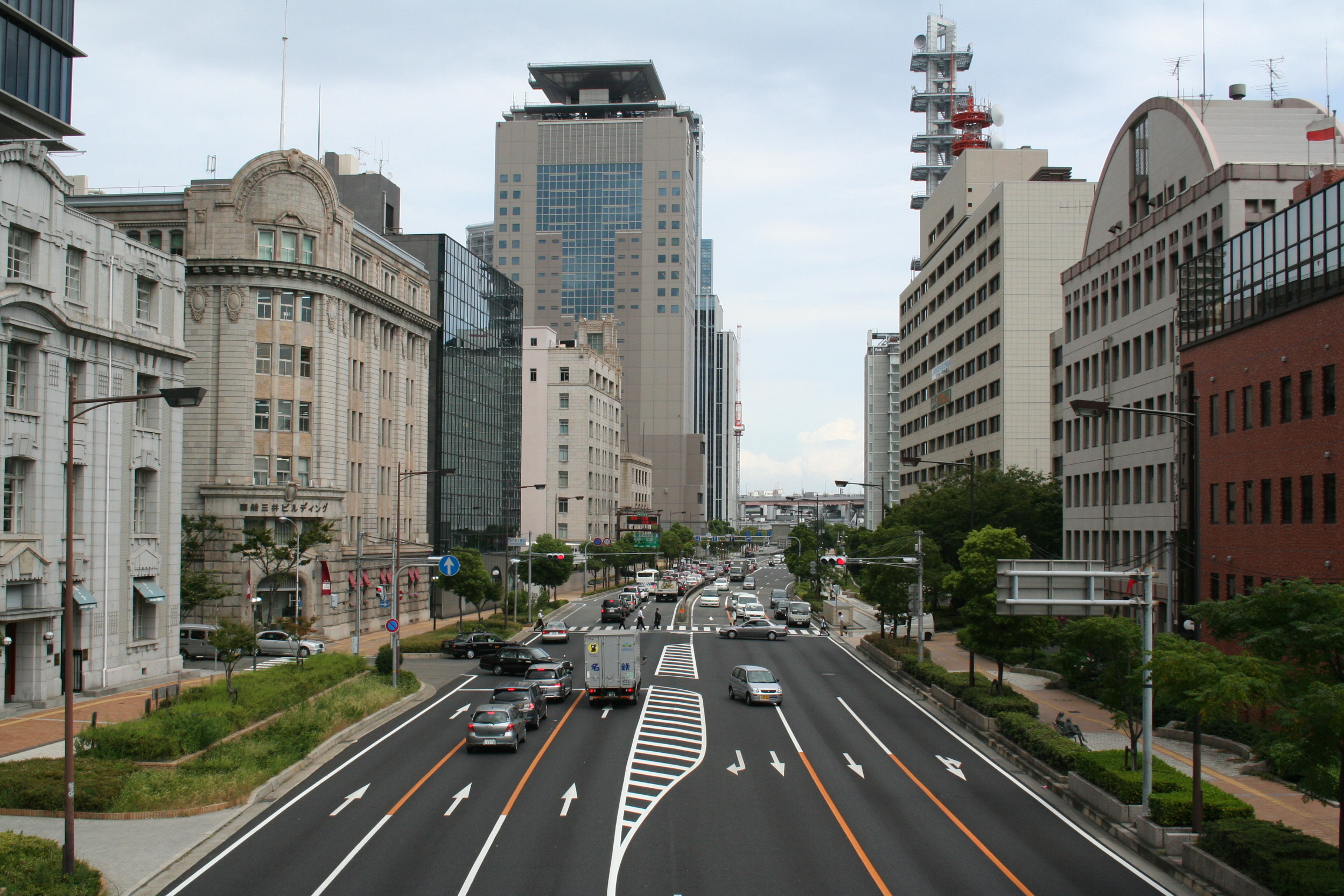
Route 2 passing through Kobe

National Route 2 (国道2号, Kokudō Ni-gō) is a major highway on the islands of Honshū and Kyūshū in Japan. It follows the old Sanyōdo westward from the city of Osaka, Osaka Prefecture in the Kansai region to the city of Kitakyūshū in Fukuoka Prefecture, passing through the San'yō region en route. Between Hyōgo Prefecture and Yamaguchi Prefecture it parallels the Sanyō Expressway; it crosses the Kanmon Straits through the Kanmon Roadway Tunnel. Its total length is 533.2 km. At its Osaka terminus, it meets Route 1; at its western terminus, it links with Routes 3 and 10.

== Route data ==
- Length: 533.2 km (331.4 mi)
- Origin: Umeda, Kita-ku, Osaka (originates at the terminus of Routes 1, 25 and 176 and the origins of Routes 26, 163 and 165)
- Terminus: Moji-ku, Kitakyushu (ends at the origins of Routes 3 and 10)
- Major cities: Kobe, Himeji, Himeji, Okayama, Kurashiki, Fukuyama, Hiroshima, Iwakuni, Shimonoseki

== History ==
- 4 December 1952 - First Class National Highway 2 (from Osaka to Kitakyushu)
- 1 April 1965 - General National Highway 2 (from Osaka to Kitakyushu)

== Overlapping sections ==
- From Nishinomiya (Fudabasuji intersection) to Kobe (San'nomiya-East intersection): Route 171
- From Kobe (Higashi-Shiriike intersection) to Akashi (Kariguchi intersection): Route 28
- From Kobe (Higashi-Shiriike intersection) to Akashi (Kokubo intersection): Route 250
- From Himeji to Taishi Town (Taishi-Kamiota IC): Route 29
