= Matsudaira Tadaaki =

Japanese samurai

1st Lord of Himeji (Okudaira-Matsudaira)
- In office 1639–1644
- Preceded by: Honda Masakatsu
- Succeeded by: Matsudaira Tadahiro

Personal details
- Born: 1583 Mikawa Province, Japan
- Died: May 1, 1644 (aged 60–61) Edo, Musashi Province, Japan
- Parent(s): Okudaira Nobumasa; Kamehime

Matsudaira Tadaaki (松平 忠明; 1583 – May 1, 1644) was a Japanese samurai of the Azuchi-Momoyama Period through early Edo period. He was a retainer and relative of the Tokugawa clan.

== Biography ==
Tadaaki was born in 1583, the fourth son of Okudaira Nobumasa, a senior Tokugawa retainer. His mother, Kamehime, was the eldest daughter of Tokugawa Ieyasu; this made Tadaaki Ieyasu's grandson. In 1588, Tadaaki was adopted by Ieyasu, and it was then that he assumed the Matsudaira surname. Following the death of his brother Matsudaira Ieharu in 1592, Tadaaki succeeded to his brother's family headship, receiving the fief of Nagane in Kōzuke Province, worth 7000 koku. He assumed the adult name of Kiyomasa, which he changed to Tadaaki in 1599, after receiving the tada (忠) character from Tokugawa Hidetada's name. In 1600, together with his father, Tadaaki sided with the Tokugawa forces at the Battle of Sekigahara.

In late 1602, Tadaaki received the fief of Tsukude, which increased his income by 10,000 koku and made him a daimyō with 17,000 koku of land. His income was raised again in 1610, when he was moved to the Ise-Kameyama Domain, worth some 50,000 koku. In 1614, he led the forces sent by the domains of Mino Province during the Sieges of Osaka.

For his service at Osaka, Tadaaki was given Osaka Castle. He was made daimyō of a domain within the provinces of Settsu and Kawachi worth 100,000 koku. For four years, Tadaaki primarily set about the rebuilding of his domain, but was soon moved once more: first to the Kōriyama Domain of Yamato Province (120,000 koku); then to Himeji in 1619 (180,000 koku). In his later years, Tadaaki assisted with the management of the fledgling Tokugawa Shogunate; he died at his estate in Edo in 1644.

His descendants had their holdings moved several times, and eventually became rulers of the Oshi Domain, where they remained until the Meiji Restoration.

== Retainers ==
Ujii Yashiro

Preceded by none	1st Lord of Tsukude (Okudaira-Matsudaira); 1602-1610	Succeeded by none
Preceded by Seki Kazumasa	1st Lord of Ise-Kameyama (Okudaira-Matsudaira); 1610-1615	Succeeded by Miyake Yasunobu
Preceded by Toyotomi Hideyori	1st Lord of Osaka (Okudaira-Matsudaira); 1615-1619	Succeeded by none
Preceded by Mizuno Katsunari	1st Lord of Kōriyama (Okudaira-Matsudaira); 1619-1639	Succeeded by Honda Masakatsu
Preceded by Honda Masakatsu	1st Lord of Himeji (Okudaira-Matsudaira); 1639-1644	Succeeded by Matsudaira Tadahiro
