= Miyake Yasunobu =

Japanese daimyō

1st Daimyō of Ise-Kameyama (Miyake)
- In office 1620–1632
- Preceded by: Matsudaira Tadaaki
- Succeeded by: Miyake Yasumori

Personal details
- Born: 1563 Tōtōmi Province, Japan
- Died: November 9, 1632 (aged 68–69) Ise-Kameyama Domain, Ise Province, Japan

Miyake Yasunobu (三宅 康信; 1563 – November 9, 1632) was a Japanese daimyō of the late Sengoku period through early Edo period. He was born in Tōtōmi Province, the eldest son of Miyake Yasusada. Together with his father, Yasunobu served Tokugawa Ieyasu, fighting in many of the Tokugawa clan's major campaigns. During the Battle of Sekigahara (1600), Yasunobu served as castle warden of Yokosuka Castle, and was granted wardenship of Kameyama Castle after the campaign. In 1614, during the first Sieges of Osaka, he defended Sunpu Castle in Suruga Province; during the following year, he supervised the defense of Yodo Castle. After his father's death the same year, he succeeded to family headship, and received his father's domain of Koromo. His income was raised by 2,000 koku in 1620, when he received the Ise-Kameyama Domain (12,000 koku).

Yasunobu died in 1632 in Kameyama, at age 70. His eldest son Yasumori succeeded him.

| Preceded by Miyake Yasusada | 2nd Daimyō of Koromo (Miyake); 1615–1620 | Succeeded by none |
| Preceded by Matsudaira Tadaaki | 1st Daimyō of Ise-Kameyama (Miyake); 1620–1632 | Succeeded by Miyake Yasumori |
