= Japan National Route 165 =

Road in Japan

National Route 165
- 国道165号
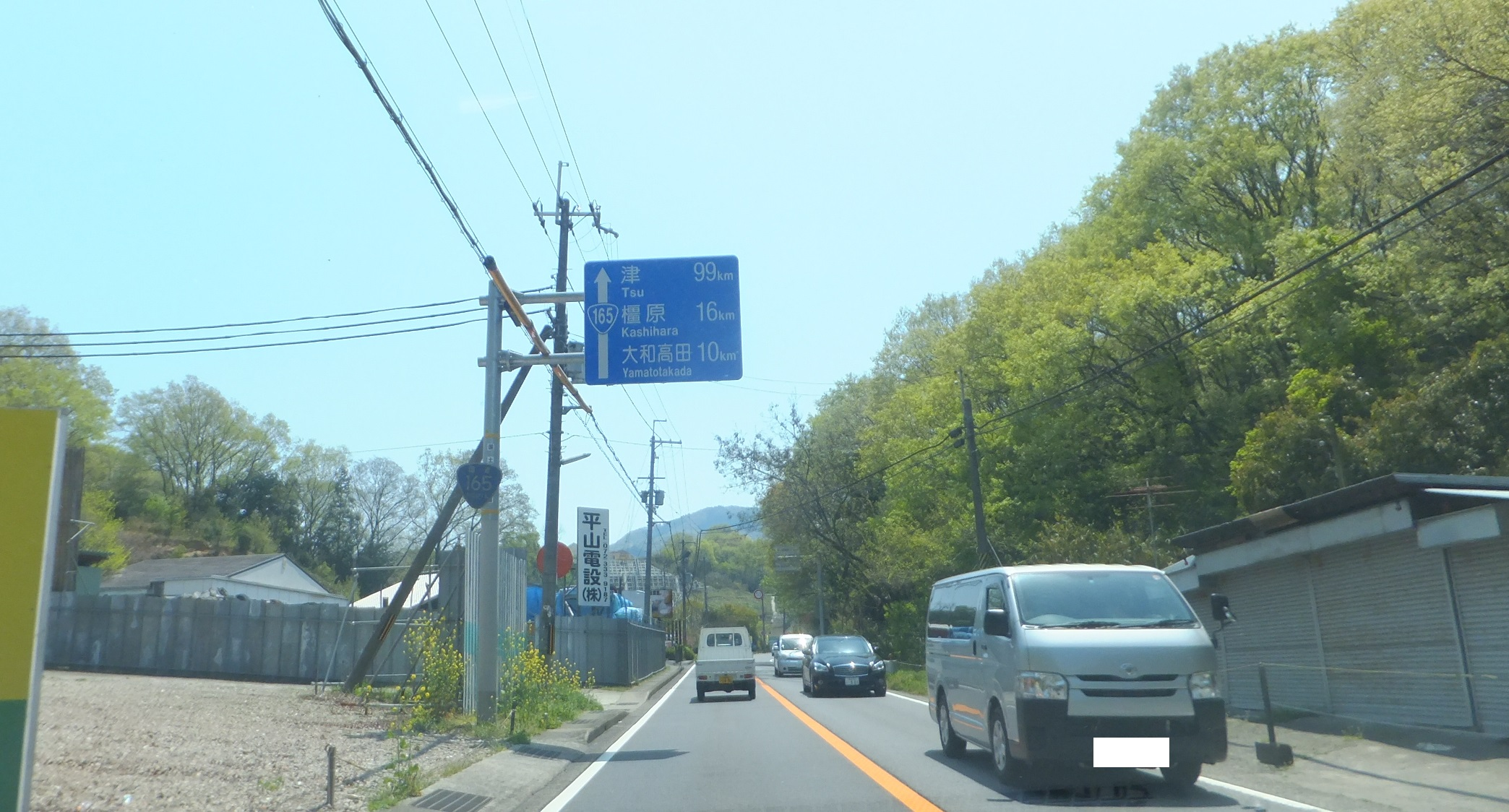

Route information
- Length: 126.5 km (78.6 mi)
- Existed: 18 May 1953–present

Major junctions
- West end: National Route 25 / National Route 26 in Kita-ku, Osaka
- East end: National Route 23 in Tsu, Mie

Location
- Country: Japan

Highway system
- National highways of Japan; Expressways of Japan
← National Route 164	→ National Route 166

National Route 165 (国道165号, Kokudō hyakuroku-jūgo-gō) is a national highway connecting Kita-ku in the city of Osaka, Osaka Prefecture, and the city of Tsu, Mie Prefecture, Japan.

== Route description ==
- Length: 126.5 km
- Origin: Kita-ku, Osaka, Osaka Prefecture (originates at the terminus of Routes 2, 25, and 176)
- Terminus: Tsu, Mie Prefecture
