= Suzuka District, Mie =

Former district in Mie prefecture, Japan

Suzuka (鈴鹿郡, Suzuka-gun) was a district located in Mie Prefecture, Japan.

As of 2003, the district had an estimated population of 7,051 and a density of 88.27 persons per km^{2}. The total area was 79.88 km^{2}.

== Towns and villages ==
- Seki

== Merger ==
- On January 11, 2005, the town of Seki merged into the expanded city of Kameyama. Suzuka District was dissolved as a result of this merger.
