= Ishikawa clan =

Japanese clan

Ishikawa 石川
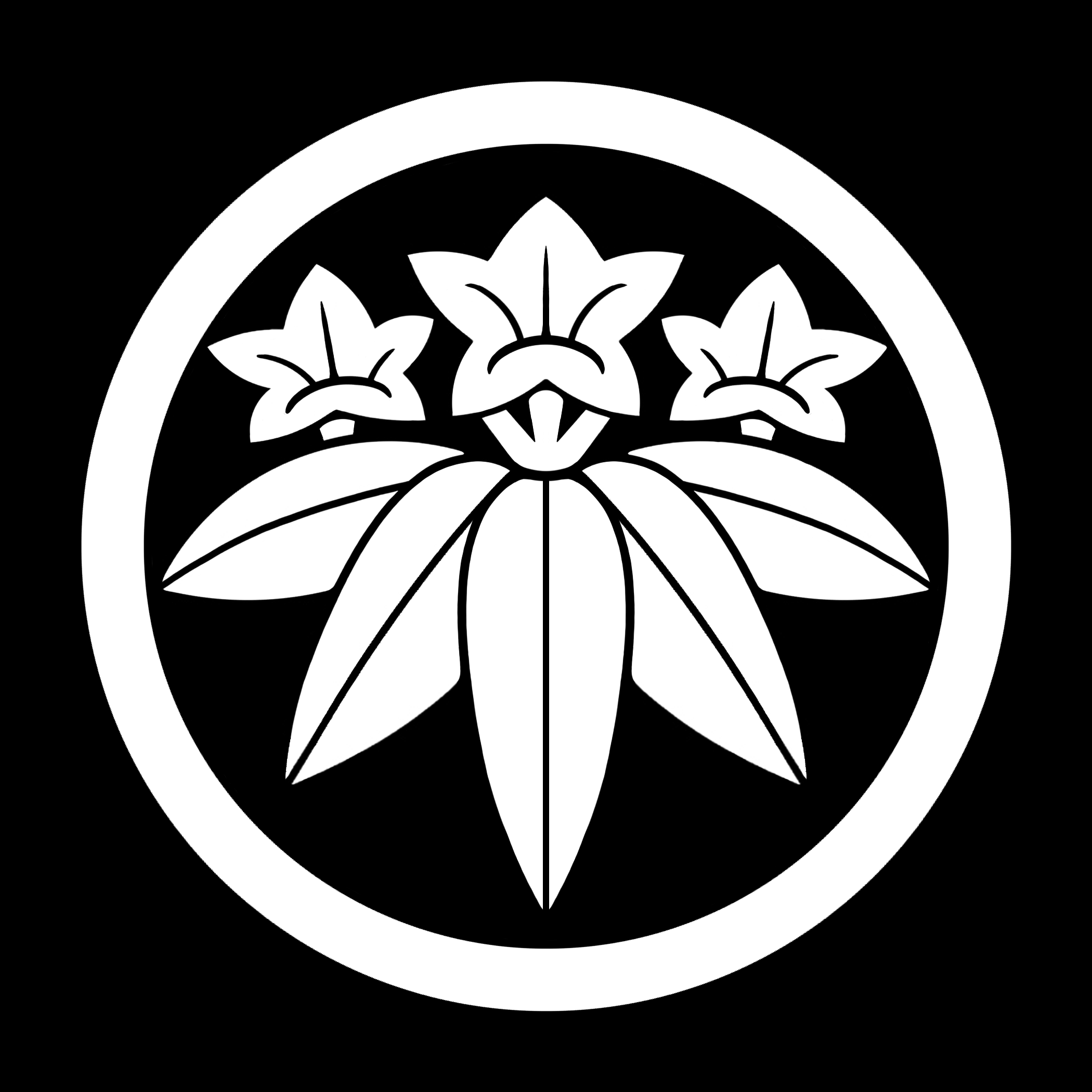
- Ishikawa clan emblem
- Home province: Kawachi; Mikawa; Ise; Mutsu
- Parent house: Minamoto clan (Seiwa Genji)
- Final ruler: Ishikawa Tomoji
- Founding year: 15th century
- Cadet branches: Nakagawa clan

Ishikawa clan (Japanese: 石川氏, Hepburn: Ishikawa-shi) is a Japanese samurai family which descended from the Seiwa Genji.

== History ==
The clan traces its history from Minamoto no Yoshiie through his son Minamoto no Yoshitoki.

The Ishikawa district of Kawachi Province is named after them. In the Sengoku Period, the family had two major branches; one of them, which had settled in Mikawa Province in the 15th century, was a family of retainers serving what became the Tokugawa clan. Ishikawa Kazumasa, one of Tokugawa Ieyasu's senior retainers, was famous in his era for suddenly leaving Tokugawa service and pledging loyalty to Toyotomi Hideyoshi. However, as Kazumasa's son Yasunaga became implicated in the Ōkubo Yasunaga incident, his branch of the Ishikawa of Mikawa came to an end then. The Mikawa-Ishikawa line continued through Kazumasa's uncle Ienari, Ienari's descendants eventually came to rule the Ise-Kameyama Domain for most of the Edo period.

The other branch of the family, which had established itself in Kawachi Province, was the ancestor of the Nakagawa clan, which ruled the Oka Domain for the entirety of the Edo period.

== Select list of clan members ==
- Ishikawa Yasumichi (1554–1607)
- Ishikawa Tadafusa (1572–1650)
- Ishikawa Kiyokane
- Ishikawa Yasumasa
- Ishikawa Yasunaga
- Ishikawa Kazumasa
- Ishikawa Kazunori
- Ishikawa Tomoji (1900-1940)

== Mutsu-Ishikawa clan ==
Ishikawa clan was a samurai family from the mid-Heian period to the Warring States period (Japan). The clan's original surname was Genji. The family was descended from Minamoto no Yorito, a son of Minamoto no Yorichika, as the progenitor of the clan, in a line of Yamato Genji, a branch of Seiwa-Genji. The Ishikawa clan was often called the Mutsu Ishikawa clan so as not to be confused with other Ishikawa clans.

In 1051, Yorito, together with his son Minamoto no Arimitsu, went to Oshu (Northern Honshu, the region encompassing Mutsu and Dewa provinces) following the Governor of Mutsu Province, Minamoto no Yoriyoshi, to serve in Zen Kunen no Eki (Former Nine Years' Campaign.) Arimitsu directed the army in place of Yorito, who was killed in the battlefield of Kuriyagawa. In 1063, Arimitsu was appointed to Junior Fifth Rank, Lower Grade, Governor of Aki Province and granted the land of Shirakawa-gun County in Mutsu Province (later Iwaki no kuni) for distinguished war service. He constructed Miyoshi-jo Castle in Ishikawa-go district and lived there, when he took the family name Ishikawa.

When the sixth head of the family Ishikawa Hirosue heard that Minamoto no Yoritomo raised an army to defeat the Taira family in Izu, he dispatched an army headed by his uncle Mitsuharu to Kamakura in 1183. In 1188, when Yoritomo advanced to the Shirakawa Barrier to attack the Oshu-Fujiwara clan, he visited the Kawabe Hachiman-gu Shrine in the land of Ishikawa and prayed for a victory, and after three days' stay, headed for the battlefield of Mt. Atsukashi in Date-gun County. Yoritomo suppressed Oshu, and visited the shrine on his triumphant return to offer a donation.

Ishikawa Tokimitsu, the thirtieth head of the family, sent an army headed by his eldest son Ishikawa Yoshimitsu to join the shogunate government overthrowing army headed by Nittq Yoshisada. When the Kamakura bakufu (Japanese feudal government headed by a shogun) fell and the Kenmu Restoration started in 1333, Ishikawa Tokimitsu went up to Kyoto and was appointed to Junior Fifth Rank, Lower Grade, the Imperial Household Secretary by the new government, and Junior Fourth Rank, Lower Grade, the Master of the Palace Table in 1334.

Nevertheless, the Ishikawa clan was treated coldly by the new government for the reason that it was tied closely with the Kamakura bakufu, and in the time of Ishikawa Sadamitsu, the fourteenth head of the family, the Governor of Mutsu Province, Kitabatake Akiie, distributed the fief traditionally succeeded and controlled by Ishikawa clan to the Yuki family and the Wachi clan. Sadamitsu raised the army to make a stand but was defeated instead, and in 1335, followed Ashikaga Takauji and took the side of the Northern Court. Yoshimitsu participated in the Battle of Minatogawa as a leader of the Ashikaga army and was killed in the Battle of Hieizan Sakamoto. Thereafter, fierce battles were repeated between the Ishikawa clan, which aimed to recover the former fief, and the Yuki clan.

In 1563, Ishikawa Harumitsu, the twenty-fifth head of the family, adopted Kojiro (later, he was renamed Ishikawa Akimitsu), the fourth son of Harumune DATE and handed over the head of the family to him and retired.

In 1590, Akimitsu, the twenty-sixth head of the family, postponed sending the reinforcements to the Invasion of Odawara headed by Toyotomi Hideyoshi, as he was afraid of Date Masamune who did not participate in the invasion. Hideyoshi bore resentment against Akimitsu and transferred the fief of the Ishikawa clan to Gamo Ujisato on the pretext of punishment of the powerful warriors in the area of Oshu to prevent them from strengthening their power. A senior vassal Mizoi Rokuro insisted on Akimitsu's clear assertion that he bear no treacherous intentions against Hideyoshi, but nobody agree to that opinion; and at last, they were obliged to serve the Date family. Mizoi entrenched himself in the castle alone, set fire to the castle and committed suicide with his sword. In 1598, Akimitsu became the lord of Kakuda in Igu-gun County, the land worthwhile a million koku of rice, moved Chosen-ji Temple, which was the site of a Buddhist mortuary tablet of Ishikawa family, from Ishikawa to the new fief, and did the ceremonial transfer of a divided tutelary deity to a new location of God of War, which was a guardian deity of the Ishikawa family, from Ishikawa to the new fief. On this occasion, some members of the clan followed Akimitsu and moved to Kakuda, the others abandoned the samurai status and remained in Ishikawa as farmers and merchants. In 1603, Akimitsu handed over the headship of the family to his legitimate son Yoshimune, but in 1610 when Yoshimitsu died at the age of 34, Akimitsu returned to Kakuda-jo Castle and attended to government affairs.
