= Kameyama, Mie =

Kameyama 亀山市
- City
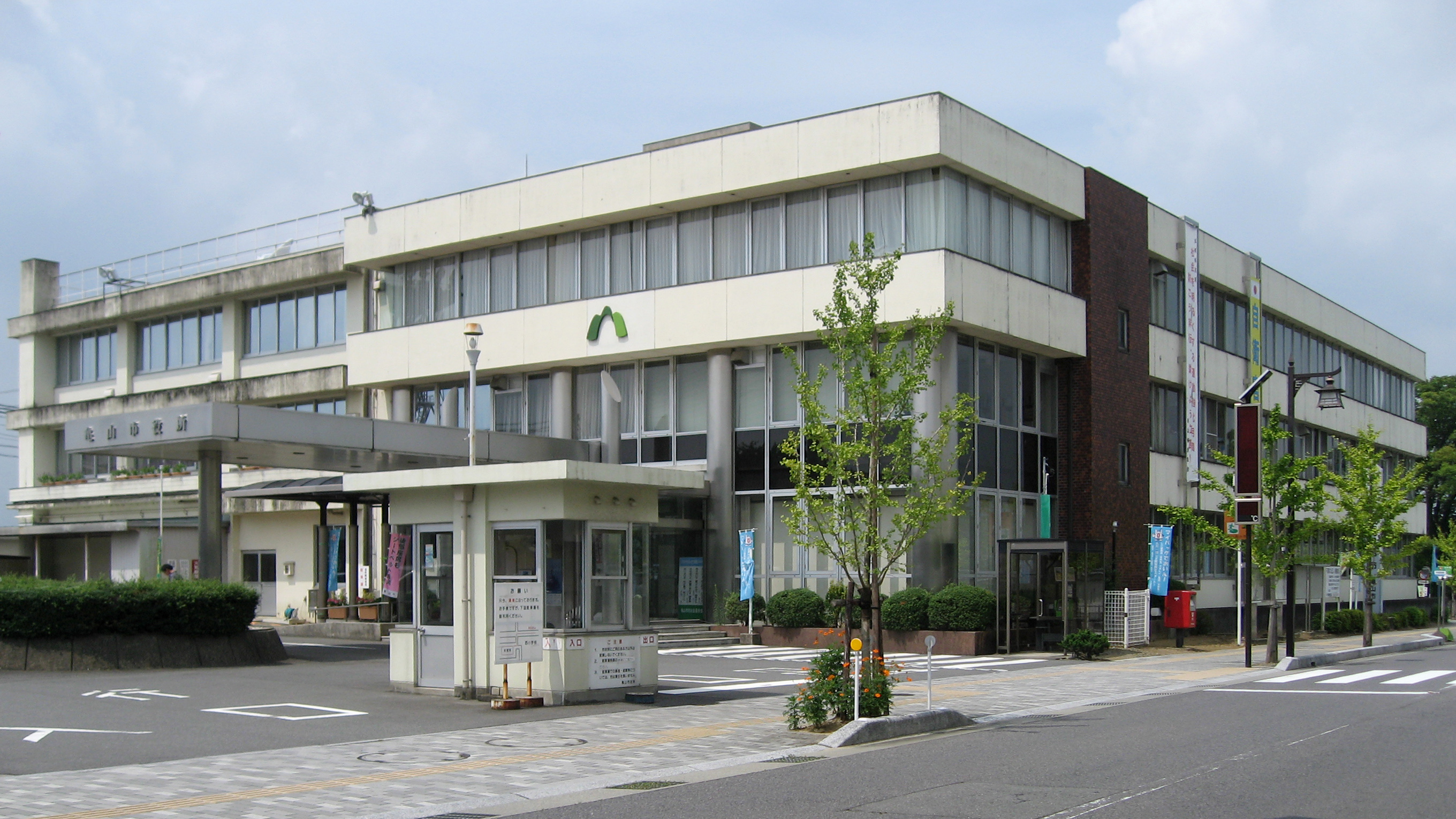
- Kameyama City Hall

- Flag Seal

- Location of Kameyama in Mie Prefecture

- Coordinates: 34°51′21″N 136°27′6″E
- Country: Japan
- Region: Kansai
- Prefecture: Mie

Government
  - Mayor: Yoshiyuki Sakurai (since February 2009)

Area
  - Total: 190.91 km^{2} (73.71 sq mi)

Population (August 2021)
  - Total: 49,457
  - Density: 259.06/km^{2} (670.96/sq mi)
- Time zone: UTC+9 (Japan Standard Time)
- Phone number: 0595-82-1111
- Address: 577 Honmaru-cho, Kameyama-shi, Mie-ken 519-0195
- Climate: Cfa
- Website: Official website
- Symbols
- Flower: Japanese iris
- Tree: Cryptomeria

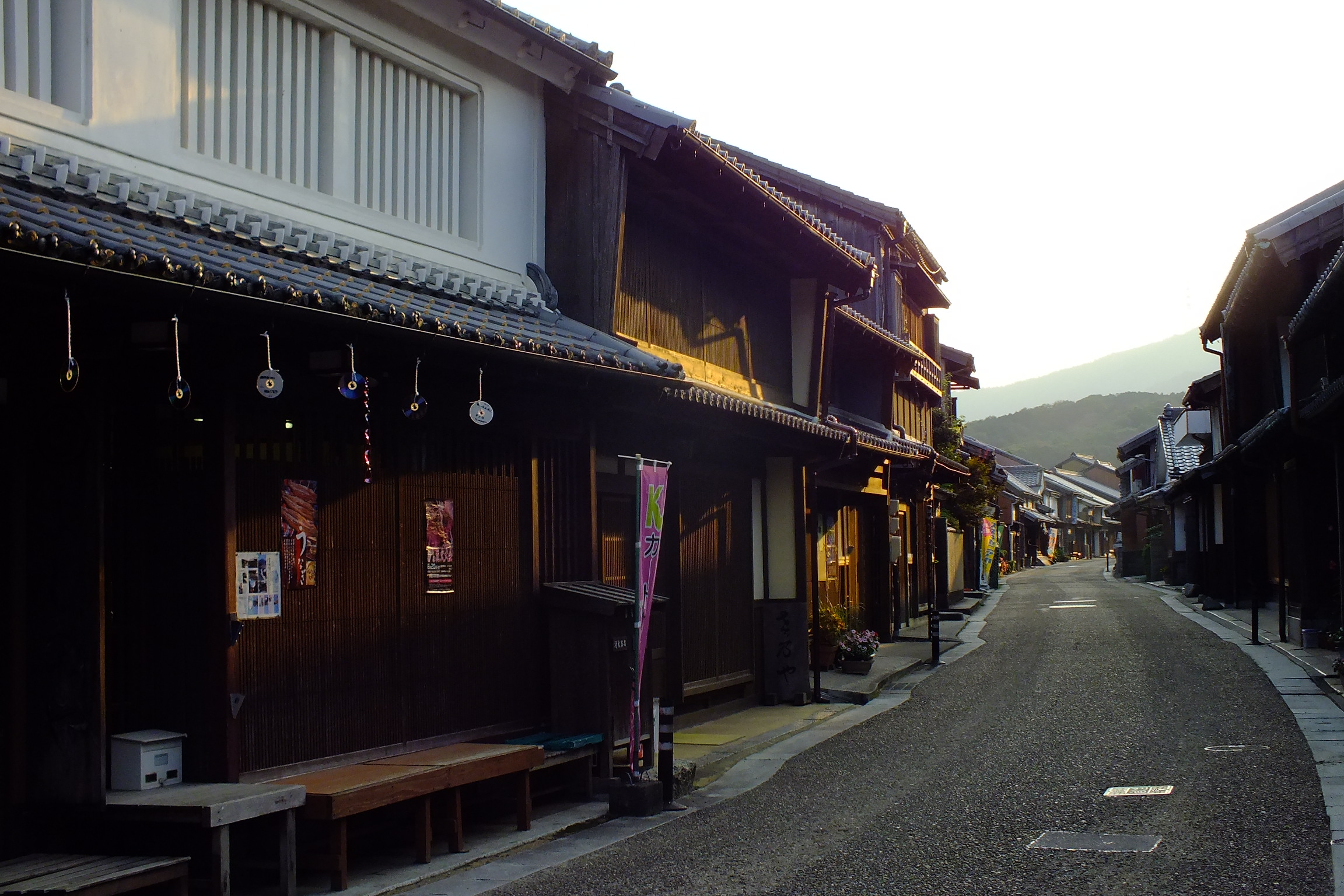
Seki-juku (Tōkaidō)

Kameyama (亀山市, Kameyama-shi) is a city located in northern Mie Prefecture, Japan. As of 1 August 2021, the city had an estimated population of 49,457 in 21,745 households and a population density of 260 persons per km². The total area of the city is 190.91 km^{2} (73.71 square miles).

== Geography ==
Kameyama is located in the north-central part of Mie Prefecture. The Suzuka Mountains are in the northwestern part of the city, and the Nunobiki Mountains are in the southwestern part. More than half of the city's area is forest.

=== Neighboring municipalities ===
Mie Prefecture

- Iga
- Suzuka
- Tsu

Shiga Prefecture

- Kōka

=== Climate ===
Kameyama has a humid subtropical climate (Köppen Cfa) characterized by warm summers and cool winters with light to no snowfall. The average annual temperature in Kameyama is 15.1 °C (59.2 °F). The average annual rainfall is 1,853.7 mm (72.98 in) with September as the wettest month. The temperatures are highest on average in August, at around 26.7 °C (80.1 °F), and lowest in January, at around 4.3 °C (39.7 °F).

Climate data for Kameyama (1991−2020 normals, extremes 1979−present)
Month	Jan	Feb	Mar	Apr	May	Jun	Jul	Aug	Sep	Oct	Nov	Dec	Year
Record high °C (°F)	16.9 (62.4)	21.2 (70.2)	25.6 (78.1)	29.9 (85.8)	32.9 (91.2)	35.4 (95.7)	38.5 (101.3)	37.9 (100.2)	36.3 (97.3)	32.7 (90.9)	25.9 (78.6)	21.5 (70.7)	38.5 (101.3)
Mean daily maximum °C (°F)	8.8 (47.8)	9.6 (49.3)	13.5 (56.3)	19.1 (66.4)	23.5 (74.3)	26.3 (79.3)	30.2 (86.4)	31.7 (89.1)	27.7 (81.9)	22.3 (72.1)	16.8 (62.2)	11.3 (52.3)	20.1 (68.1)
Daily mean °C (°F)	4.3 (39.7)	4.7 (40.5)	8.0 (46.4)	13.2 (55.8)	18.0 (64.4)	21.6 (70.9)	25.6 (78.1)	26.7 (80.1)	23.0 (73.4)	17.4 (63.3)	11.7 (53.1)	6.6 (43.9)	15.1 (59.1)
Mean daily minimum °C (°F)	0.1 (32.2)	0.3 (32.5)	3.0 (37.4)	7.9 (46.2)	12.9 (55.2)	17.6 (63.7)	22.1 (71.8)	22.9 (73.2)	19.2 (66.6)	13.0 (55.4)	6.8 (44.2)	2.2 (36.0)	10.7 (51.2)
Record low °C (°F)	−5.8 (21.6)	−6.5 (20.3)	−4.4 (24.1)	−1.0 (30.2)	3.7 (38.7)	9.6 (49.3)	14.0 (57.2)	14.4 (57.9)	8.1 (46.6)	1.9 (35.4)	−1.7 (28.9)	−5.4 (22.3)	−6.5 (20.3)
Average precipitation mm (inches)	57.3 (2.26)	68.8 (2.71)	120.0 (4.72)	153.4 (6.04)	203.0 (7.99)	255.8 (10.07)	211.2 (8.31)	180.8 (7.12)	284.1 (11.19)	178.8 (7.04)	81.3 (3.20)	59.3 (2.33)	1,853.7 (72.98)
Average precipitation days (≥ 1.0 mm)	8.1	8.7	10.9	10.1	10.7	12.6	12.1	10.3	12.1	10.0	6.8	7.5	119.9
Mean monthly sunshine hours	145.6	142.9	176.3	191.1	196.4	145.1	163.9	195.1	149.8	158.1	154.3	155.3	1,973.7
Source: Japan Meteorological Agency

=== Demographics ===
Per Japanese census data, the population of Kameyama has increased slowly over the past 50 years.

Historical population
Year	Pop.	±%
1960	39,148	—
1970	37,817	−3.4%
1980	40,578	+7.3%
1990	45,045	+11.0%
2000	46,606	+3.5%
2010	51,047	+9.5%

== History ==
Kameyama developed as the castle town of Kameyama Castle, which belonged to the Ise-Kameyama Domain under the Tokugawa shogunate. In the early 17th century, the castle town was Kameyama-juku, the forty-sixth post station of Tōkaidō. Seki-juku and Sakashita-juku on the Tōkaidō, also fall within its borders. During the establishment of the modern municipalities system in the early Meiji period, Kamayama-juku was organized into the town of Kameyama within Suzuka District. It was elevated to city status on October 1, 1954.

On January 11, 2005, the town of Seki (also from Suzuka District) was merged into Kameyama.

== Government ==
Kameyama has a mayor-council form of government with a directly elected mayor and a unicameral city council of 18 members. Kameyama contributes one member to the Mie Prefectural Assembly. In terms of national politics, the city is part of Mie 2nd district of the lower house of the Diet of Japan.

== Economy ==
Candles are a traditional product of the city. Sharp Corporation has been operating one of the world's largest LCD factories in the city since January 8, 2004.

== Education ==
Kameyama has eleven public elementary schools and three public middle schools operated by the city government and one public high school operated by the Mie Prefectural Department of Education. There is also one private high school.

== Transportation ==
=== Railway ===
JR Tōkai – Kansai Main Line

- Idagawa - Kameyama

JR Tōkai – Kisei Main Line

- Kameyama - Shimonoshō

JR West – Kansai Main Line

- Kameyama - Seki - Kabuto

=== Air ===
The city does not have its airport. The nearest airports are:

- Chubu Centrair International Airport, located 94 km (58 mi) east.
- Itami Airport, located 122 km (76 mi) west.
- Kansai International Airport, located 147 km (91 mi) south west.

=== Highway ===
- Higashi-Meihan Expressway
- Ise Expressway
- Shin-Meishin Expressway
- National Route 1
- National Route 25
- National Route 306

== Local attractions ==
- Kameyama Castle
- Seki-juku

== Sister cities ==
Kameyama is twinned with:

- Gose, Nara, Japan, since 1998
- Habikino, Osaka, Japan, since 1998

== Notable people ==
- Shiro Hattori - linguist
- Teinosuke Kinugasa - film director
- Kiyoshi Toyoda - baseball player
