= Seki Kazumasa =

Japanese daimyō

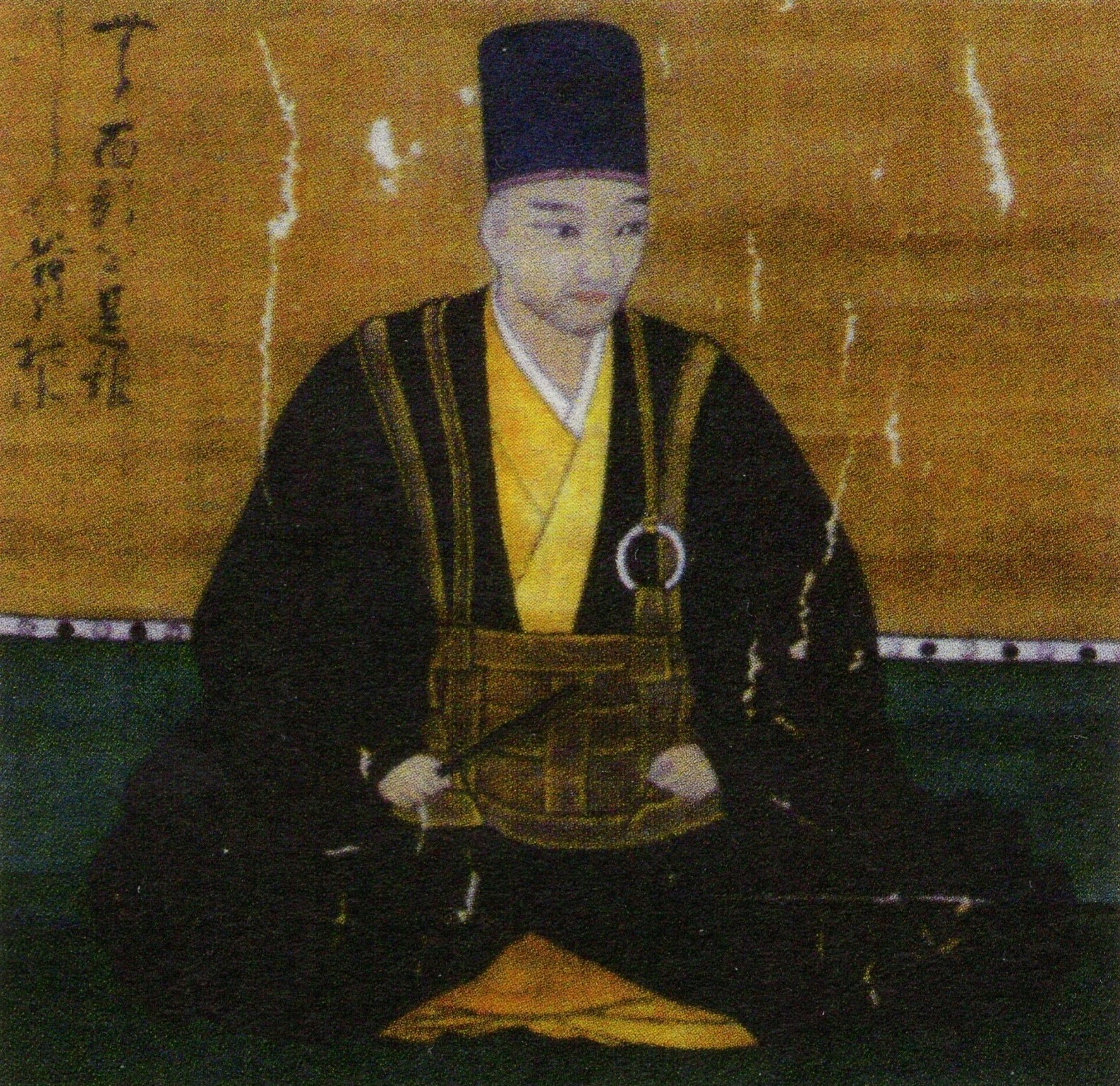

1st Daimyō of Kurosaka (Seki)
- In office 1611–1618
- Preceded by: none
- Succeeded by: none

Personal details
- Born: 1564
- Died: November 19, 1625 (aged 60–61)

Seki Kazumasa (関 一政; 1564 – November 19, 1625) was a Japanese daimyō of the late Sengoku period through early Edo period, who was a retainer of the Oda and Toyotomi clans.

== Positions ==
Kazumasa’s court title was Nagato no kami (長門守). He took part in many of the major campaigns of the Toyotomi clan, serving as a yoriki under his brother-in-law Gamō Ujisato.

== Military career ==
In the early Edo period, he served under the Tokugawa clan at the Sieges of Osaka. His domain of Kurosaka was confiscated in 1618, due to internal disturbances.

== Death ==
Kazumasa died in 1625, but his nephew and adoptive son Ujimori was granted 5,000 koku and allowed to succeed to family headship as a high-ranking hatamoto.

Preceded by none	Daimyō of Tara (Seki); 1600	Succeeded by none
Preceded by none	Daimyō of Ise-Kameyama (Seki); 1600–1611	Succeeded by Matsudaira Tadaaki
Preceded by none	Daimyō of Kurosaka (Seki); 1611–1618	Succeeded by none
