= Seki, Mie =

Seki 関町
- Former municipality
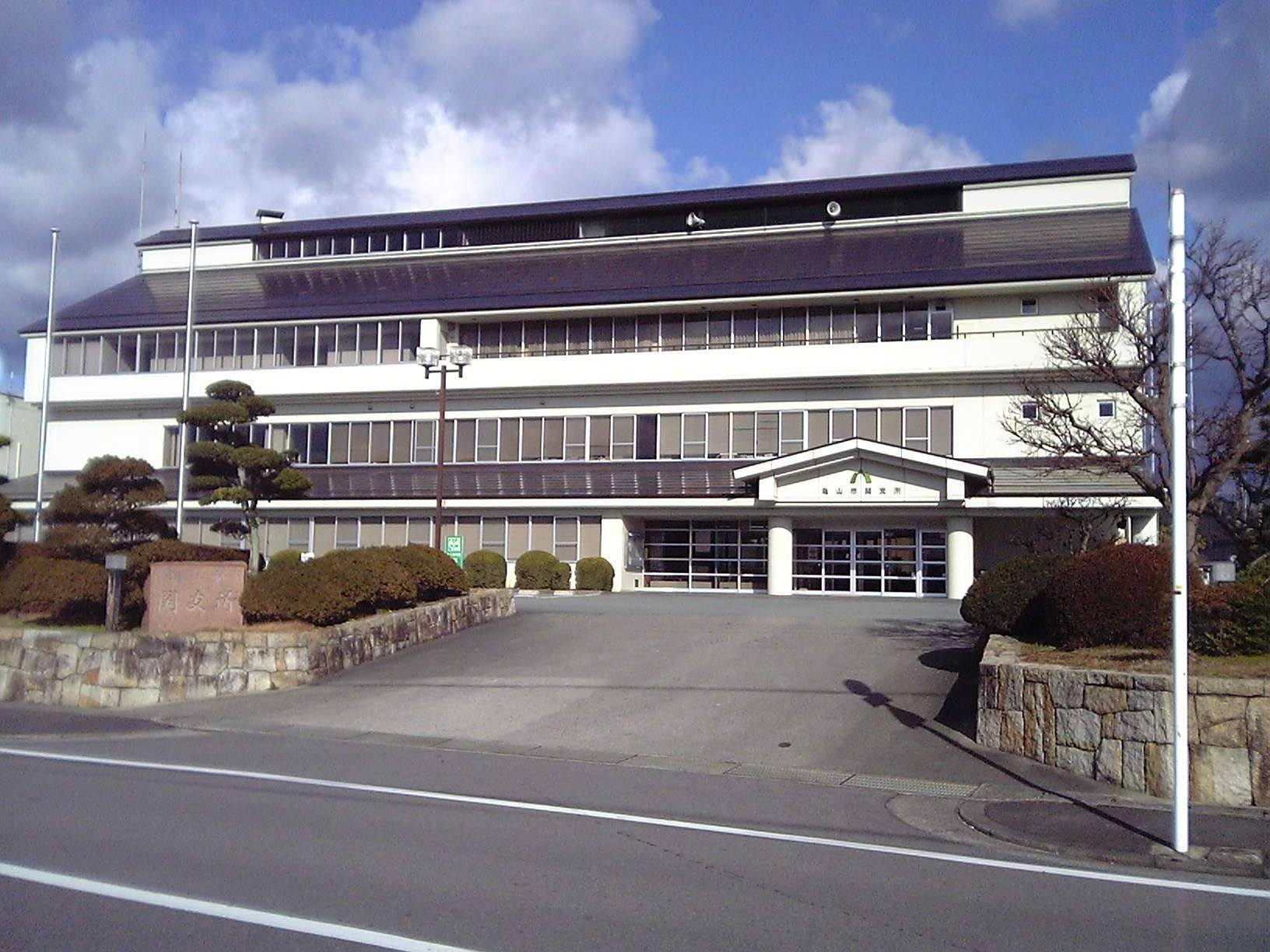
- former Seki town hall

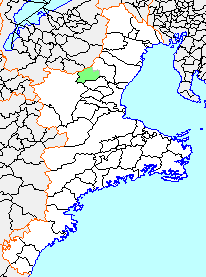
- Location of Seki in Mie Prefecture

- Location in Japan
- Coordinates: 34°51′17″N 136°23′27″E
- Country: Japan
- Region: Kansai (Kinki)
- Prefecture: Mie Prefecture
- District: Suzuka
- Merged: February 11, 2005 (now part of Kameyama)

Area
  - Total: 79.88 km^{2} (30.84 sq mi)

Population (November 1, 2005)
  - Total: 7,277
  - Density: 91.1/km^{2} (236/sq mi)
- Time zone: UTC+09:00 (JST)
- Symbols
- Bird: Japanese pheasant
- Flower: Satsuki
- Tree: Cryptomeria

Seki (関町, Seki-cho) was a town located in Suzuka District, Mie Prefecture, Japan.

== Population ==
As of November 1, 2004 (the last official figures before its dissolution), the town had an estimated population of 7,277 and a population density of 91.1 persons per km^{2}. The total area was 79.88 km^{2}.

== History ==
The town of Seki was founded on April 1, 1889 with the early Meiji period establishment of municipalities. From the late Nara period through the Edo period, it had existed as Seki-juku, a post town on the Tōkaidō connecting the capital of Japan with the eastern provinces.

On January 11, 2005, Seki was merged into the expanded city of Kameyama and thus no longer exists as an independent municipality.
