= Japan National Route 25 =

National highway in Japan

National Route 25
- 国道25号

Route information
- Length: 144.5 km (89.8 mi)
- Existed: 1952–present

Major junctions
- West end: National Route 1 / National Route 2 in Osaka
- East end: National Route 23 in Yokkaichi

Location
- Country: Japan

Highway system
- National highways of Japan; Expressways of Japan
← National Route 24	→ National Route 26

National Route 25 (国道25号, Kokudō nijūgo-gō) is a national highway connecting Yokkaichi and Osaka in Japan.

== Route data ==
- Length: 144.5 km (89.8 mi)
- Origin: Yokkaichi (originates at junction with Route 23)
- Terminus: Osaka (ends at junction with Routes 1 and 2)
- Major cities: Kameyama, Iga, Tenri

== History ==
- 4 December 1952 - Designated as First Class National Highway 25 (from Osaka to Nara)
- 18 May 1953 - Designation of Second Class National Highway 163 (from Osaka to Yokkaichi)
- 1 April 1963 - Designated as First Class National Highway 25 (from Yokkaichi to Osaka)
- 1 April 1965 - Second Class National Highway 163 was redesignated as General National Highway 25 between Yokkaichi and Osaka

== Intersects with ==
- Mie Prefecture
- Nara Prefecture
- Osaka Prefecture
