= Japan National Route 23 =

National highway in Japan

National Route 23
- 国道23号

Route information
- Length: 213.7 km (132.8 mi)
- Existed: 4 December 1952–present

Major junctions
- East end: National Route 1 in Toyohashi
- West end: Ise Shrine in Ise

Location
- Country: Japan

Highway system
- National highways of Japan; Expressways of Japan
← National Route 22	→ National Route 24

National Route 23 (国道23号, Kokudō nijūsan-gō) is a national highway connecting Toyohashi and Ise, Mie in Japan.

== Route data ==
- Length: 213.7 kilometres (132.8 miles)
- Origin: Toyohashi (originates at junction with Route 1)
- Terminus: Ise (ends at Ise Shrine)
- Major cities: Nishio, Nagoya, Yokkaichi and Tsu

== History ==
- 4 December 1952 - Designated as First Class National Highway 23 (from Yokkaichi, Mie to Ise, Mie)
- 1 April 1965 - Designated as General National Highway 23 (from Yokkaichi, Mie to Ise, Mie)
- 1 April 1975 - The highway was extended with the addition of a section between Yokkaichi, Mie and Toyohashi.

== Intersects with ==
- Aichi Prefecture
- Mie Prefecture
