= Itakura (surname) =

Itakura (written: 板倉) is a Japanese surname. Notable people with the surname include:

- Itakura Katsukiyo (板倉 勝静, 1823–1889), Japanese daimyō
- Itakura Katsumasa (板倉 勝政, 1759–1821), Japanese daimyō
- Itakura Katsushige (板倉 勝重, 1545–1624), Japanese daimyō
- Itakura Katsusuke (板倉 勝弼), Japanese daimyō
- Itakura Katsutake (板倉 勝武, 1736–1769), Japanese daimyō
- Itakura Katsutsune (板倉 勝職, 1803–1849), Japanese daimyō
- Itakura Katsuyori (板倉 勝従, 1750–1778), Japanese daimyō
- Katsuyuki Itakura (板倉 克行, 1943–2014), Japanese jazz pianist
- Itakura Katsuzumi (板倉 勝澄, 1719–1769), Japanese daimyō
- Keiichi Itakura (板倉 啓壹, born 1942), Japanese molecular biologist
- Ko Itakura (板倉 滉, born 1997), Japanese footballer
- Miki Itakura (板倉 美紀, born 1975), Japanese racewalker
- Mikio Itakura (板倉 幹夫, born 1941), Japanese sport shooter
- Nachimi Itakura (板倉 奈智美, born 1975), Japanese ten-pin bowler
- Itakura Shigemasa (板倉 重昌, 1588–1638), Japanese daimyō
- Itakura Shigemune (板倉 重宗, 1586–1657), Japanese daimyō
- Itakura Shigenori (板倉 重矩, 1617–1673), Japanese daimyō
- Yoshiaki Itakura (板倉 由明, 1932–1999), Japanese military historian
