= Itakura clan =

Japanese Clan

Itakura 板倉
- Home province: Mikawa
- Parent house: Shibukawa clan (Ashikaga clan)
- Titles: Various
- Dissolution: still extant

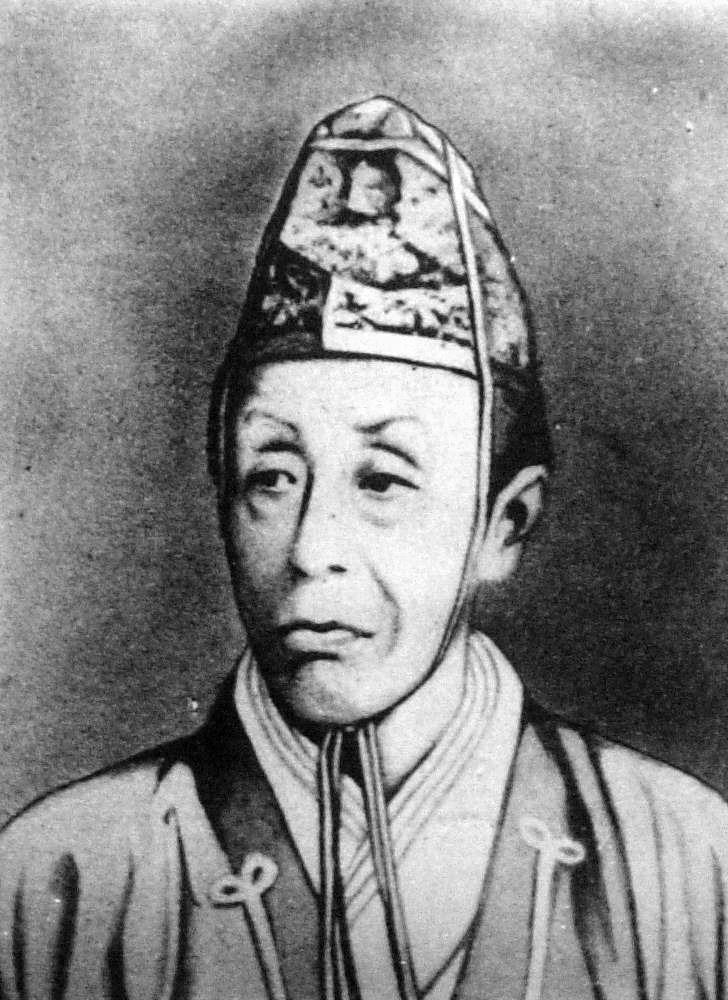
Itakura Katsukiyo, a famous clan member of the 19th century

The Itakura clan (Japanese: 板倉氏, Hepburn: Itakura-shi) is a Japanese clan which came to prominence during the Sengoku period. The family claimed descent from Shibukawa Yoshiaki, the son of Ashikaga Yasuuji, a relative of the Ashikaga shōguns. Over time, the clan evolved into several branches which were daimyō, ruling the Bitchū-Matsuyama, Niwase, Fukushima, and Annaka Domains.

One of Yoshiaki's descendants went to Mikawa Province and entered the service of the Matsudaira clan; the Itakura subsequently became fudai. The Itakura served the Matsudaira clan during its rise to power in the 16th century, and became senior officials in the new Tokugawa shogunate.

In the Edo period, the Itakura were identified as one of the fudai or insider daimyō clans which were hereditary vassals or allies of the Tokugawa clan, in contrast with the tozama or outsider clans.

== Head Family ==
1. Itakura Katsushige
2. Itakura Shigemune
3. Itakura Shigesato (1619-1662)
4. Itakura Shigetsune (1643-1688)
5. Itakura Shigefuyu (1672-1709)
6. Itakura Shigeharu (1697-1724)
7. Itakura Katsuzumi
8. Itakura Katsutake
9. Itakura Katsuyori
10. Itakura Katsumasa
11. Itakura Katsuaki
12. Itakura Katsutsune
13. Itakura Katsukiyo
14. Itakura Katsusuke
15. Itakura Katsunori

== Itakura clan genealogy ==
The fudai Itakura clan originated in early 17th century Mikawa province. They claim descent from the Seiwa-Genji through the Shibukawa branch of the Imperial family.

- The senior or main branch of the Itakura was created 1609. After the Battle of Sekigahara, the Itakura were given significant responsibilities in the evolving shogunal government. Itakura Katsushige (1542–1624) was made the Kyoto shoshidai in 1601; and he continued to hold this high office during the next twenty years. During this period, Katsushige saw significant increases in the revenues allotted to him by the shogunate. His importance within the shogunate can be measured by the record of grown in his annual expected income which rose to 40,000 koku; however, he had no castle in his charge. As compensation of sort, Katsushige was given the title Iga no kami. Itakura Shigemune (1587–1656) was the oldest son of Katsushige; and he succeeded to the office of Kyoto shoshidai in 1620. He would continue to hold this office through 1654. Two years later, he became daimyō at Sekiyado Domain (50,000 koku) in Shimōsa province. Itakura Shigesato (1620–1660), the oldest son of Shigemune, was known as Awa no kami and he held the shogunate title of Jisha-bugyō. His descendants would reside successively at Kameyama Domain in Ise Province in 1669; at Toba Domain in Shima province in 1710; at Kameyama in Ise Province in 1717; and finally, from 1744 through 1868, at Matsuyama (50,000 koku) in Bitchū Province. The head of this clan line was ennobled as a "Viscount" in the Meiji period.
- A cadet branch of the Itakura was created in 1624 for the progeny of Itakura Shigemasa (1588–1638), the second son of Itakura Katsushige. He was honored with 15,000 koku from the revenues of Mikawa province in acknowledgment of his conduct during the Siege of Osaka in 1615. Subsequently, Itakura Shigenori (1617–1673), the son of Shigemasa, was the Osaka jodai and rōjū, and then Kyoto shoshidai in 1668. In 1672, he received the fief of Kasuyama (60,000 koku) in Shimotsuke province. Itakura Shigetane (1640–1705), the son of Shigenori, was installed in 1680 at Iwatsuki Domain in Musashi province, and in the following year, he was transferred to Sakamoto Domain in Shinano province. Later, Itakura Shigehiro was established at Fukushima Domain (80,000 koku) in Mutsu province where his descendants remained up through the Meiji Restoration in 1868. The head of this clan line was ennobled as a "Viscount" in the Meiji period.
- Another cadet branch was created in 1661. The members of this clan resided successively in 1681 at Annaka Domain (15,000 koku) in Kōzuke province; in 1702 at Izumi Domain (20,000 koku) in Mutsu province; in 1746 at Sagara Domain (25,000 koku) in Tōtōmi province; and eventually, from 1749 through 1868 at Annaka Domain (30,000 koku) in Kōzuke province. The head of this clan line was ennobled as a "Viscount" in the Meiji period.
- A further cadet branch created 1683. This branch of the Itakura lived continuously from 1699 through 1868 at Niwase Domain (20,000 koku) in Bitchū province. The head of this clan line was ennobled as a "Viscount" in the Meiji period.

== Notable clan members ==
Itakura Katsukiyo, the famous shogunate official, was a prominent member of this clan in the 19th century. Another was Itakura Shigemasa, the first leader of the shogunate's armies at the Shimabara Rebellion. The Inukai were a cadet family serving as magistrates to the Niwase clan who eventually became a Prime Minister following the Meiji reforms. Members of this line remain prominent in Japanese society today.

- Itakura Katsushige (1542–1624), 2nd Kyoto shoshidai.
- Itakura Shigemune (1587–1656), 3rd Kyoto shoshidai.
- Itakura Shigemasa (1588–1638), Lord of Fukōzu, aide to Tokugawa Ieyasu
- Itakura Shigenori (1617–1673), 5th Kyoto shoshidai.
- Itakura Katsuzumi (1719–1769), 1st Itakura Daimyō of the Bitchū-Matsuyama domain
- Itakura Katsukiyo (1823-1889), Noted Tokugawa rōjū, later became a Shinto priest
- Itakura Katsusato (1839-1913), 12th & final daimyō of Fukushima, created viscount, served in House of Peers
- Inukai Tsuyoshi (1855–1932), Elected to Diet in 1890, Prime Minister of Japan 1931-1932

== See also ==
- Joseph Hardy Neesima
- (in Japanese) Itakura clan on Harimaya's "Buke-kaden" (22 Sept. 2007)
