= Itakura Katsuaki =

Itakura Katsuaki may refer to:

- Itakura Katsuaki (Bitchu-Matsuyama) (1801–1804), daimyō of Bitchū-Matsuyama Domain
- Itakura Katsuaki (Fukushima) (1814-1877), daimyō of Fukushima Domain

== See also ==
- Itakura clan
