= Annaka Domain =

Japanese historical estate in Kozuke province

Annaka Domain 安中藩
- under Tokugawa shogunate Japan
- 1615–1871
- Capital: Annaka Castle
  - Type: Daimyō
- Historical era: Edo period
  - Established: 1615
  - Disestablished: 1871
- Today part of: part of Gunma Prefecture

Annaka Domain (安中藩, Annaka-han) was a feudal domain under the Tokugawa shogunate of Edo period Japan, located in Kōzuke Province (modern-day Gunma Prefecture), Japan. It was centered on Annaka Castle in what is now the city of Annaka, Gunma.

== History ==
Ii Naomasa was one of Tokugawa Ieyasu's most trusted Four Generals, and was made daimyō of Hikone Domain, with revenues of 180,000 koku. After his death in 1603, he was succeeded by his son, Ii Naokatsu, who was in poor health. Naokatsu sent his younger brother, Ii Naotaka to the Siege of Osaka, where he served with great distinction. As a reward, Tokugawa Ieyasu gave Hikone to Naokatsu, and reassigned his elder brother to the much smaller holding (30,000 koku) of Annaka in 1615. This marked the start of Annaka Domain. After beginning work on Annaka Castle and the surrounding castle town, Naotsugu retired in favor of his son, Ii Naoyoshi, who was transferred to Nishio Domain in Mikawa Province in 1643.

The Ii clan was replaced by Mizuno Mototsugu from Shinjō Domain in Mikawa, and the domain was reduced to 20,000 koku. He turned the domain over to his son Mizonu Mototomo in 1663; however after Mototomo went insane and attempted to murder his wife in 1667, he was relieved of his post.

The shogunate then assigned Hotta Masatomo to the domain. Masatomo also served as rōjū to Shōgun Tokugawa Ietsuna from 1679–80. He left Annaka on his appointment to Tairō under Tokugawa Tsunayoshi in 1681. A hatamoto, Itakura Shigekata, was then raised to the ranks of daimyo, and assigned to Annaka. His son, Itakura Shigeatsu was reassigned to Izumi Domain in Mutsu Province in 1702, exchanging places with Naitō Masamori. The Naitō clan ruled for three generations until their transfer to Komori Domain in Shinano Province in 1749.

The Itakura clan then returned to Annaka in the form of Itakura Katsukiyo, formerly of Sagara Domain in Tōtōmi Province. The Itakura continued to rule Annaka until the end of the Edo period. During their rule, Annaka came to be known as an educational center after the 4th Itakura daimyo, Itakura Katsunao, established a domain academy in 1808. His heir, Itakura Katsuakira, was also fond of study and encouraged his vassals to study. The meiji-era educator Joseph Hardy Neesima was born in his reign as the son of a retainer of the domain. Hearing he had talent, Katsuakira ordered him to take up Dutch studies at his age of 14. Neeshima's grandfather was formerly Shugen mystic, and, expected to utilize his knowledge by the ruler of those days Katsunao, later became a lower-ranked feudal retainer of Annaka Domain. Katsuakira, being an exemplary political figure of early Bakumatsu-era, having antiforeignism and chauvinism, and taking Japan's situation seriously, encouraged new industry in his domain and conducted military trainings, for example: Ansei Toashi.

Meanwhile, the domain had suffered greatly during the Great Tenmei famine of 1782–1788 and its finances were further ruined by the burden of having to repair the Nakasendo and provide an escort for Princess Kazunomiya on her travel to Edo to wed Shōgun Tokugawa Iemochi in 1862. During the Bakumatsu period, discontent with the shogunate led to the Sekihōtai movement, which started in Annaka. During the Boshin War, the final daimyo, Itakura Katsumasa was assigned by Shōgun Tokugawa Yoshinobu to hold the Usui Pass against the armies of the Satchō Alliance, but he quickly capitulated to the imperial forces.

After the end of the conflict, with the abolition of the han system in July 1871, Annaka Domain became "Annaka Prefecture", which later became part of Gunma Prefecture. The Meiji-era educator Joseph Hardy Neesima was the son of a retainer of the Itakura clan of Annaka.

The domain had a population of 896 samurai in 206 households per a census in 1872.

== Holdings at the end of the Edo period ==
As with most domains in the han system, Tatebayashi Domain consisted of several discontinuous territories calculated to provide the assigned kokudaka, based on periodic cadastral surveys and projected agricultural yields.

- Kōzuke Province
  - 6 villages in Gunma District
  - 34 villages in Usui District
- Shimōsa Province
  - 9 villages in Katori District
  - 10 villages in Inba District
  - 4 villages in Kaijō District

== List of daimyōs ==
#	Name	Tenure	Courtesy title	Court Rank	kokudaka
Ii clan (fudai) 1615–1645
1	Ii Naokatsu (井伊直勝)	1615–1632	Sakon-no-taifu (左近大夫)	Lower 4th (従四位下)	30,000 koku
2	Ii Naoyoshi (井伊直好)	1632–1645	Hyōbu-shōyu (兵部少輔)	Lower 5th (従五位下)	30,000 koku
Mizuno clan (fudai) 1645–1667
1	Mizuno Mototsuna (水野元綱)	1645–1664	Bingo-no-kami (備後守)	Lower 5th (従五位下)	20,000 koku
2	Mizuno Mototomo (水野元知)	1664–1667	Shinano-no-kami (信濃守)	Lower 5th (従五位下)	20,000 koku
Hotta clan (fudai) 1667–1681
1	Hotta Masatoshi (堀田正俊)	1667–1681	Chikuzen-no-kami (筑前守); Jijū (侍従)	Lower 4th (従四位下)	20,000→40,000 koku
Itakura clan (fudai) 1681–1702
1	Itakura Shigekata (板倉重形)	1681–1684	Iyo-no-kami (伊予守)	Lower 5th (従五位下)	15,000 koku
2	Itakura Shigeatsu (板倉重同)	1684–1702	Iyo-no-kami (伊予守)	Lower 5th (従五位下)	15,000 koku
Naitō clan (fudai) 1702–1749
1	Naito Masamori (内藤政森)	1702–1733	Tanba-no-kami (丹波守)	Lower 5th (従五位下)	20,000 koku
2	Naito Masasato (内藤政里)	1733–1746	-none-	-none-	20,000 koku
3	Naito Masamitsu (内藤政苗)	1746–1749	Tanba-no-kami (丹波守)	Lower 5th (従五位下)	20,000 koku
Itakura clan (fudai) 1749–1871
1	Itakura Katsukiyo (板倉勝清)	1749–1780	Sado-no-kami (佐渡守); Jijū (侍従)	Lower 4th (従四位下)	20,000 ->30,000 koku
2	Itakura Katsutoshi (板倉勝暁)	1780–1792	Hizen-no-kami (肥前守)	Lower 4th (従四位下)	30,000 koku
3	Itakura Katsuoki (板倉勝意)	1792–1805	Iyo-no-kami (伊予守)	Lower 4th (従四位下)	30,000 koku
4	Itakura Katsunao (板倉勝尚)	1805–1820	Iyo-no-kami (伊予守)	Lower 5th (従五位下)	30,000 koku
5	Itakura Katsuakira (板倉勝明)	1820–1857	Iyo-no-kami (伊予守)	Lower 5th (従五位下)	30,000 koku
6	Itakura Katsumasa (板倉勝殷)	1857–1871	Kazue-no-kami (主計頭)	Lower 5th (従五位下)	30,000 koku
