= Izumi Domain =

Historical estate in Mutsu province, Japan

Izumi Domain 泉藩
- under Tokugawa shogunate Japan
- 1634–1871
- Capital: Izumi jin’ya
- Area
  - Coordinates: 36°57′03.04″N 140°51′19.47″E
  - Type: Daimyō
- Historical era: Edo period
  - Split from Iwakitaira Domain: 1634
  - Naitō: 1634
  - Itakura: 1702
  - Honda: 1746
  - Disestablished: 1871
- Today part of: part of Fukushima Prefecture

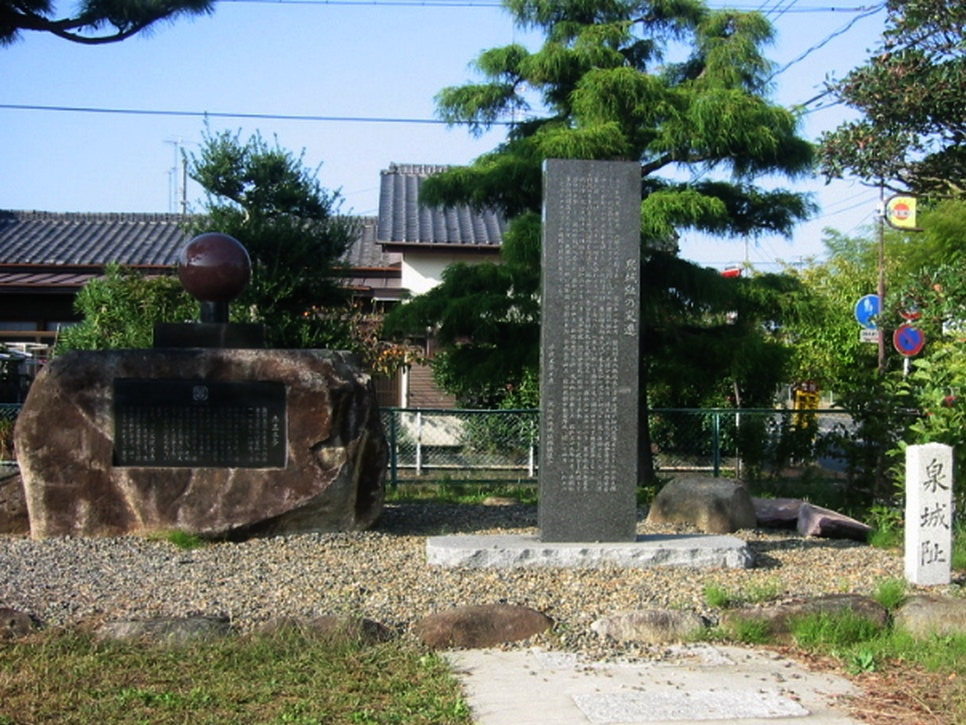
Monument in Iwaki, Fukushima marking location of Izumi jin’ya

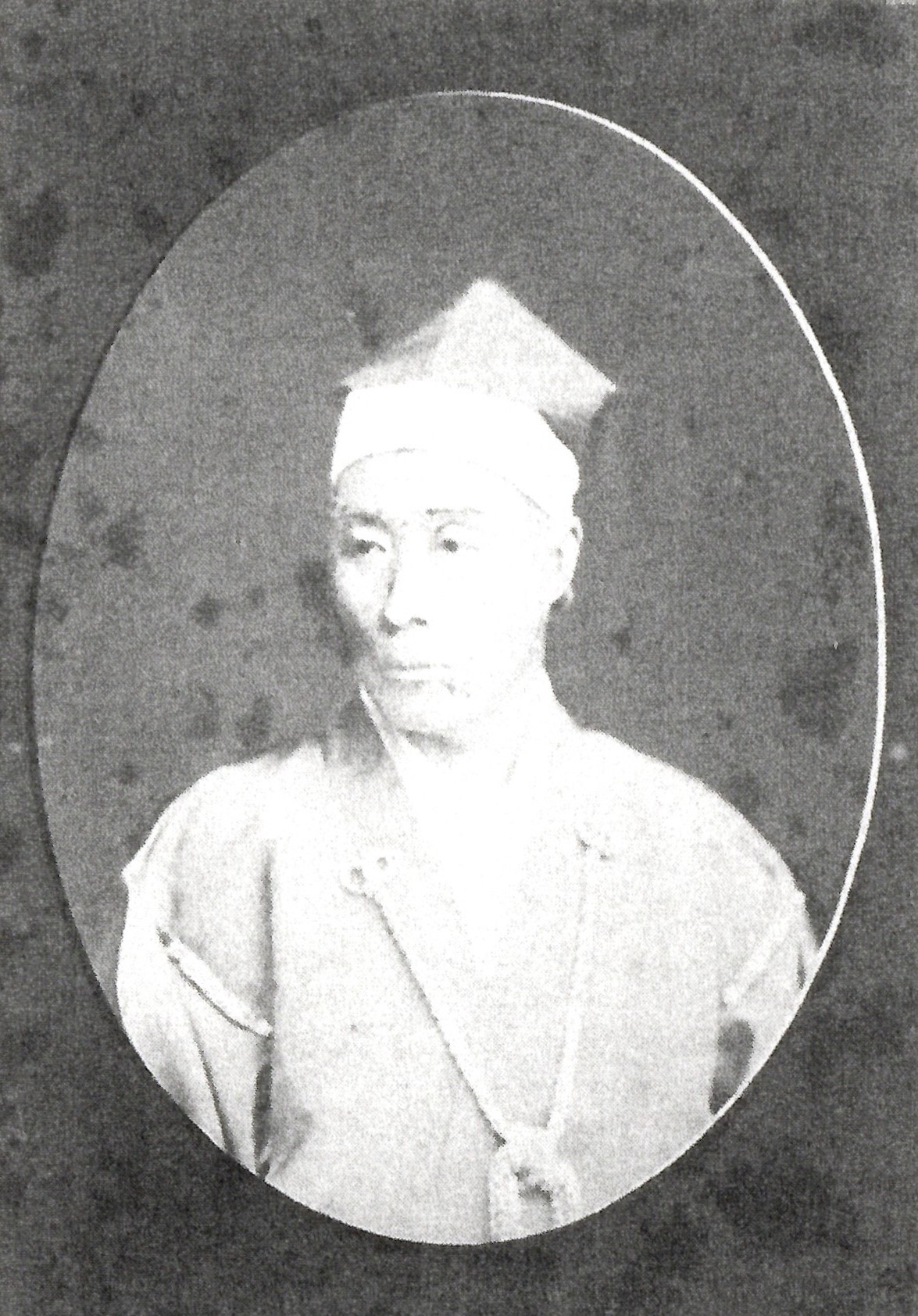
Honda Tadatoshi of Izumi Domain

Izumi Domain (泉藩, Izumi-han) was a feudal domain under the Tokugawa shogunate of Edo period Japan, located in southern Mutsu Province in what is now part of the modern-day city of Iwaki, Fukushima.

== History ==
In 1622, Torii Tadamasa, daimyō of Iwakitaira Domain was transferred to Yamagata Domain, and his place was taken by Naitō Masanaga. Masanaga transferred 20,000 koku of his 70,000 koku domain to his eldest son, Naitō Tadaoki who established a separate household. On Masanaga's death in 1634, Tadaoki inherited Iwakitaira Domain and turned his 20,000 koku holding over to his brother, Naitō Masaharu, who received official confirmation as a daimyō. This marked the start of Izumi Domain. His son, Naitō Masachika ruled from 1646–1696, and also served as wakadoshiyori from 1690–1696. His son, Naitō Masamori was transferred to Annaka Domain in 1702.

Izumi Domain was then assigned to Itakura Shigeatsu, with a reduction in revenues to 15,000 koku. His son, Itakura Katsukiyo served as rōjū and traded places with Honda Tadayuki of Sagara Domain in 1746. The Honda clan continued to rule Izumi domain through the remainder of the Edo period. Tadayuki's son, Honda Tadakazu caught the eye of rōjū Matsudaira Sadanari after successfully reforming the domain's finances, and was promoted to wakadoshiyori and sobayonin, where he played an important role in the Kansei Reforms. As a reward for his efforts, his revenues were increased by 5000 koku. The 5th daimyō of Izumi, Honda Tadanori established the domain's academy in an effort to modernize the domain in the Bakumatsu period. Honda Tadatoshi served as jisha-bugyō and led the domain in support of the Tokugawa during the Boshin War. Following the Meiji restoration, he was punished for his support of the Ōuetsu Reppan Dōmei by a reduction in income of 2000 koku, and was forced to resign in favor of his adopted son Honda Tadanobu, who served as imperial governor until the abolition of the han system in 1871.

== Holdings at the end of the Edo period ==
As with most domains in the han system, Izumi Domain consisted of several discontinuous territories calculated to provide the assigned kokudaka, based on periodic cadastral surveys and projected agricultural yields.

- Mutsu Province (Iwaki)
  - 36 villages in Kikuta District
- Kōzuke Province
  - 9 villages in Seta District
- Musashi Province
  - 10 villages in Saitama District

== List of daimyō ==
#	Name	Tenure	Courtesy title	Court Rank	kokudaka
Naitō clan, 1634–1702 (fudai)
1	Naitō Masaharu (内藤政晴)	1634–1645	Hyōbu-shosuke (兵部少輔)	Junior 5th Rank, Lower Grade (従五位下)	20,000 koku
2	Naitō Masachika (内藤政親)	1646–1696	Tamba-no-kami (丹波守)	Junior 5th Rank, Lower Grade (従五位下)	20,000 koku
3	Naitō Masamori (内藤政森)	1696–1702	Tamba-no-kami (丹波守)	Junior 5th Rank, Lower Grade (従五位下)	20,000 koku
Itakura clan, 1702–1746 (fudai)
1	Itakura Shigeatsu (板倉重同)	1702–1717	Iyo-no-kami (伊予守)	Junior 5th Rank, Lower Grade (従五位下)	15,000 koku
2	Itakura Shigekiyo (板倉勝清)	1717–1746	Sado-no-kami (佐渡守); Jijū (侍従)	Junior 4th Rank, Lower Grade (従四位下)	15,000 koku
Honda clan, 1746–1871 (fudai)
1	Honda Tadayuki (本多忠如)	1746–1754	Etchū-no-kami (越中守)	Junior 5th Rank, Lower Grade (従五位下)	15,000 koku
2	Honda Tadakazu (本多忠籌)	1754–1800	Danjō-daihitsu (弾正大弼); Jijū (侍従)	Junior 4th Rank, Lower Grade (従四位下)	15,000 --> 20,000 koku
3	Honda Tadashige (本多忠誠)	1800–1815	Kawachi-no-kami (河内守)	Junior 5th Rank, Lower Grade (従五位下)	20,000 koku
4	Honda Tadatomo (本多忠知)	1815–1836	Kawachi-no-kami (河内守)	Junior 5th Rank, Lower Grade (従五位下)	20,000 koku
5	Honda Tadanori (本多忠徳)	1836–1860	Etchū-no-kami (越中守)	Junior 5th Rank, Lower Grade (従五位下)	20,000 --> 18,000 koku
6	Honda Tadatoshi (本多忠紀)	1860–1868	Noto-no-kami (能登守)	Junior 5th Rank, Lower Grade (従五位下)	18,000 koku
7	Honda Tadanobu (本多忠伸)	1868–1871	Hyōbu-no-suke (兵庫助)	Junior 5th Rank, Lower Grade (従五位下)	18,000 koku

=== Honda Tadayuki ===
Honda Takayuki (本多忠如, 1711- November 28, 1773) was the 3rd daimyō of Sagara Domain in Tōtōmi Province and the first Honda daimyō of Izumi Domain in Mutsu Province. His wife was a daughter of Matura Atsunobu of Hirado Domain. His courtesy title was Etchū-no-kami and he held lower 5th court rank. He was the third son of Honda Tadanao, daimyō of Yamato-Kōriyama Domain and was posthumously adopted to succeed Tadanao's elder brother Honda Tadamichi as daimyō of Sagara in 1721. In 1746, the Tokugawa shogunate relocated the clan to Izumi Domain in southern Mutsu Province. In 1754, he retired in favor of his son, Honda Tadakazu. He died in 1773. His grave is at the temple of Rinshō-in in Bunkyō-ku, Tokyo.

=== Honda Tadakazu ===
Honda Tadakazu (本多忠籌, 1740 – January 17, 1813) was the 2nd Honda daimyō of Izumi Domain. He was the eldest son of Honda Tadayuki and was born at the domain's residence in Edo. His wife was a daughter of Matsura Sanenobu of Hirado Domain. In 1754, on the retirement of his father, he became daimyō. In 1787, he was promoted to wakadoshiyori within the shogunate administration, and sobayōnin the following year. In 1790, his position rose to rōjū-kaku, and together with Matsudaira Sadanobu and Matsudaira Nobuakira, he is regarded as one of the central figures of the Kansei period. In 1790, the kokudaka of the domain was also increased by 5000 koku and he received permission to be styled as “castellan”, even though the domain did not have a castle. He was a noted scholar of economics, and a proponent of the Shingaku movement. he is noted for establishing grain stores in each village as insurance against famine, and for banning abortion in his domain. He was instrumental to the shogunate's Kansei Reforms and also strongly pushed for increasing Japan's defences against the southward expansion of the Russian Empire, which threatened Ezo. He resigned his posts in 1798, and retired as daimyō in 1800 and died in 1812.

=== Honda Tadashige ===
Honda Tadashige (本多忠籌, 1761 – April 8, 1832) was the 3rd Honda daimyō of Izumi Domain. He was the older brother of Honda Tadakazu, but as his mother was a concubine, he was bypassed in the succession by his legitimate younger brother, Honda Tadao. However, Tadao was disinherited in 1785, and Tadashige became daimyō on the retirement on Honda Tadakazu in 1800. His wife was a daughter of Itakura Katsutoshi of Annaka Domain. He continued the fiscal policies of his father. He retired in 1815, and died in 1832.

=== Honda Tadatomo ===
Honda Tadatomo (本多忠知, 1787 – April 27, 1839) was the 4th daimyō of Izumi Domain. He was the eldest son of Honda Tadashige, and became daimyō in 1815 on the retirement of his father. His wife was a daughter of Yanagihara Masaatsu of Takada Domain. In 1836, he retired, turning the domain over to his 3rd son, Honda Tadanori. He died in 1839, and his grave is at the temple of Kōfuku-ji in Mukojima, Sumida, Tokyo.

=== Honda Tadanori ===
Honda Tadanori (本多忠徳, October 17, 1818 – July 29, 1860) was the 5th daimyō of Izumi Domain, He was the third son of Honda Tadatomo, and his wife was a daughter of Yanagisawa Yasuhiro of Yamato-Kōriyama Domain. He became daimyō on the retirement of his father in 1836. He built the han school. He served as a wakadoshiyori from 1841–1860 under Shōgun Tokugawa Ieyoshi. He died in Edo in 1860 at age 43 without heir.

=== Honda Tadatoshi ===
Honda Tadatoshi (本多忠紀, January 12, 1820 – February 16, 1883) was the 6th daimyō of Izumi Domain. He was the 4th son of Honda Tadatomo. His wife was a daughter of Hori Naotada of Suzaka Domain. He was posthumously adopted on the death of his older brother, Honda Tadanori in 1860, and was received in formal audience by Shōgun Tokugawa Ieshige. In 1863, he became jisha-bugyō and the same year was also appointed sōshaban. In 1864, he advanced to the post of wakadoshiyori, but was dismissed only five months later. In 1866, he again became wakadoshiyori, but again resigned after ten months. In 1868, with the start of the Boshin War, he favored the imperial cause, but was pressured into joining the pro-Tokugawa Ōuetsu Reppan Dōmei instead. As a result, the domain was invaded by the forces of the Satchō Alliance and Izumi jin’ya was burned during the Battle of Iwaki. Tadatoshi was forced to flee to Sendai. A few months later he surrendered to the Meiji government and was placed under house arrest, with the domain reduced in kokudaka by 2000 koku He was released from house arrest]in 1870 and his court rank restored. He died in 1883 and his grave is at the temple of Kōfuku-ji in Mukojima, Sumida, Tokyo.

=== Honda Tadanobu ===
Honda Tadanobu (本多忠伸, February 11, 1852 – March 5, 1903) was the 7th and final daimyō of Izumi Domain. As his predecessor, Honda Tadatoshi had been forced into retirement by the Meiji government over his involvement in the Boshin War. He was selected as heir by the Honda clan in 1868. From 1869, he became imperial governor until the abolition of the han system in 1871. He died in 1903, and his grave is at the temple of Kōfuku-ji in Mukojima, Sumida, Tokyo.

== See also ==
- List of Han
