= Fukushima Castle =

Fukushima Castle 福島城
- Fukushima, Fukushima Prefecture, Japan
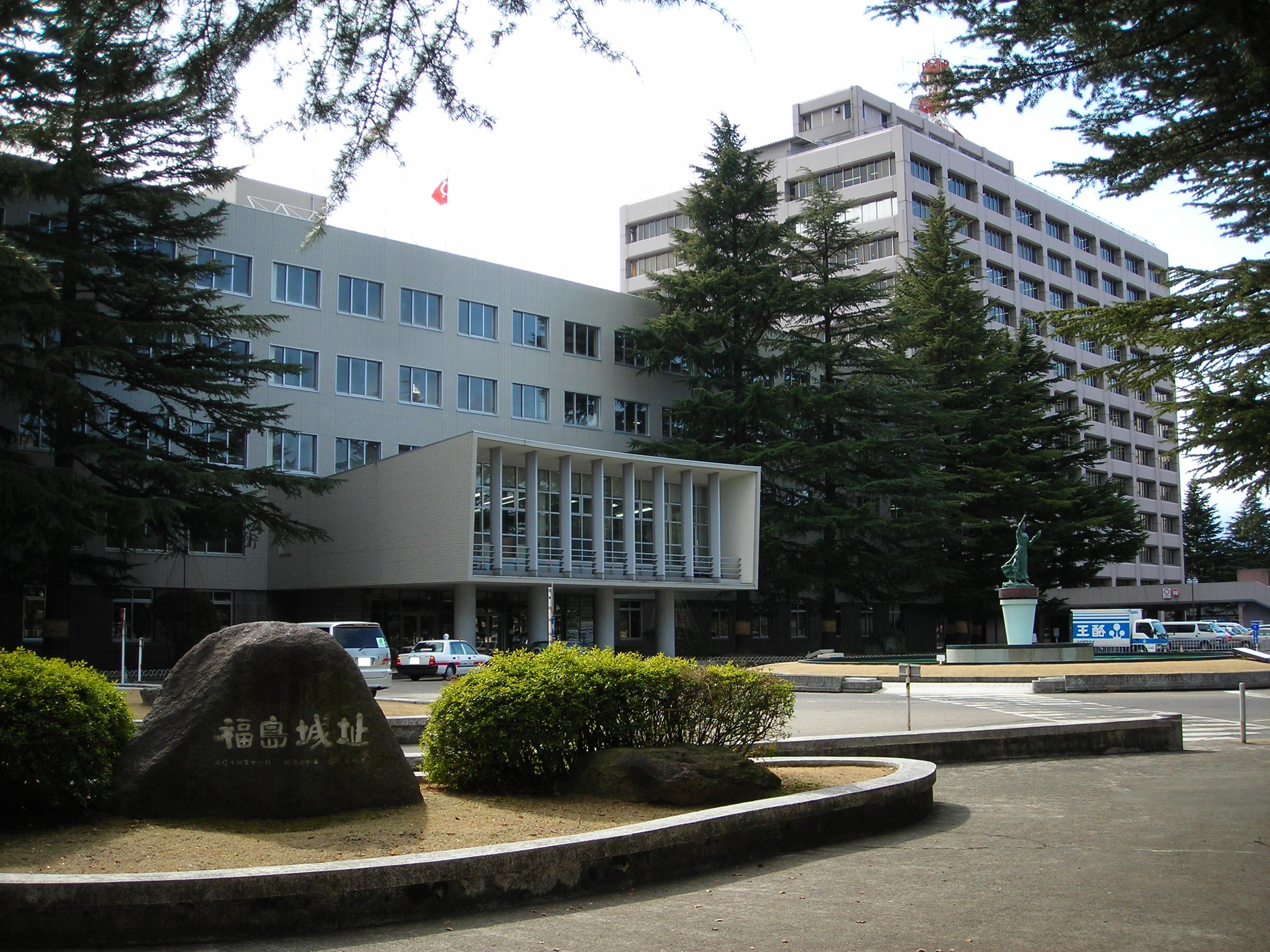
- Monument marking site of Fukushima Castle in front of Fukushima Prefectural government building

Site information
- Type: Hirayama-style Japanese castle
- Open to the public: yes
- Condition: ruins

Location
- Fukushima Castle Fukushima Castle 福島城 (Japan)
- Coordinates: 37°45′2″N 140°29′8″E

Site history
- Built: 1413
- In use: Edo period
- Demolished: 1871

Fukushima Castle (福島城, Fukushima-jō) was a Japanese castle that formed the administrative center of Fukushima Domain, a feudal domain of the Itakura clan, located in the center of what is now the city of Fukushima in Fukushima Prefecture, Japan. Nothing remains of the castle today, and the site is occupied by the Fukushima Prefectural Office and other public buildings.

== History ==
Fukushima Castle first appears in history as Daibutsu Castle (大仏城, Daibutsu-jō, alternatively Osaragi-jō) when in 1413 Date Mochimune rebelled against the Ashikaga shogunate by barricading himself inside. The Date clan retained the castle as one of their southern strongholds throughout most of the Muromachi Period. During the time of Date Terumune and Date Harumune it was also called Suginome Castle (杉妻城, Suginome-jō). In 1592, Gamō Ujisato conquered the area with his capture of nearby Ōmori Castle and assigned it to his retainer, Kimura Yoshikiyo as the center of a 50,000 koku domain. The castle was then renamed Fukushima Castle, as this was regarded as a more auspicious name. In 1601 the Battle of Matsukawa between Date Masamune and Honjo Shigenaga took place on the plains outside the castle.

Following the establishment of the Tokugawa shogunate, Fukushima was the centre of a tenryō territory with a kokudaka of 200,000 koku. In 1679, Honda Tadakuni was transferred from Yamato-Komiyama Domain, marking the start of Fukushima Domain. However, he only ruled for three years before being transferred to Himeji Domain in Harima Province. Fukushima Domain was re-established in 1686 for Hotta Masanaka, formerly of Yamagata Domain. His son, Hotta Masatora was transferred back to Yamagata in 1700. Fukushima Domain was once again revived in 1702 for Itakura Shigehiro, formerly of Itaki Domain in Shinano Province. His branch of the Itakura clan continued to rule Fukushima to the Meiji restoration.

In 1868 the castle was surrendered to the Satchō Alliance without a battle, and Fukushma Domain was abolished the following year. The castle was demolished at the start of the Meiji period.

== Literature ==
- De Lange, William (2021). An Encyclopedia of Japanese Castles. Groningen: Toyo Press. pp. 600 pages. ISBN 978-9492722300.
- Schmorleitz, Morton S. (1974). Castles in Japan. Tokyo: Charles E. Tuttle Co. pp. 144–145. ISBN 0-8048-1102-4.
- Motoo, Hinago (1986). Japanese Castles. Tokyo: Kodansha. p. 200 pages. ISBN 0-87011-766-1.
- Mitchelhill, Jennifer (2004). Castles of the Samurai: Power and Beauty. Tokyo: Kodansha. p. 112 pages. ISBN 4-7700-2954-3.
- Turnbull, Stephen (2003). Japanese Castles 1540-1640. Osprey Publishing. p. 64 pages. ISBN 1-84176-429-9.
