= Bitchū Matsuyama Castle =

Castle in Japan

- 備中松山城
- Takahashi, Okayama, Japan
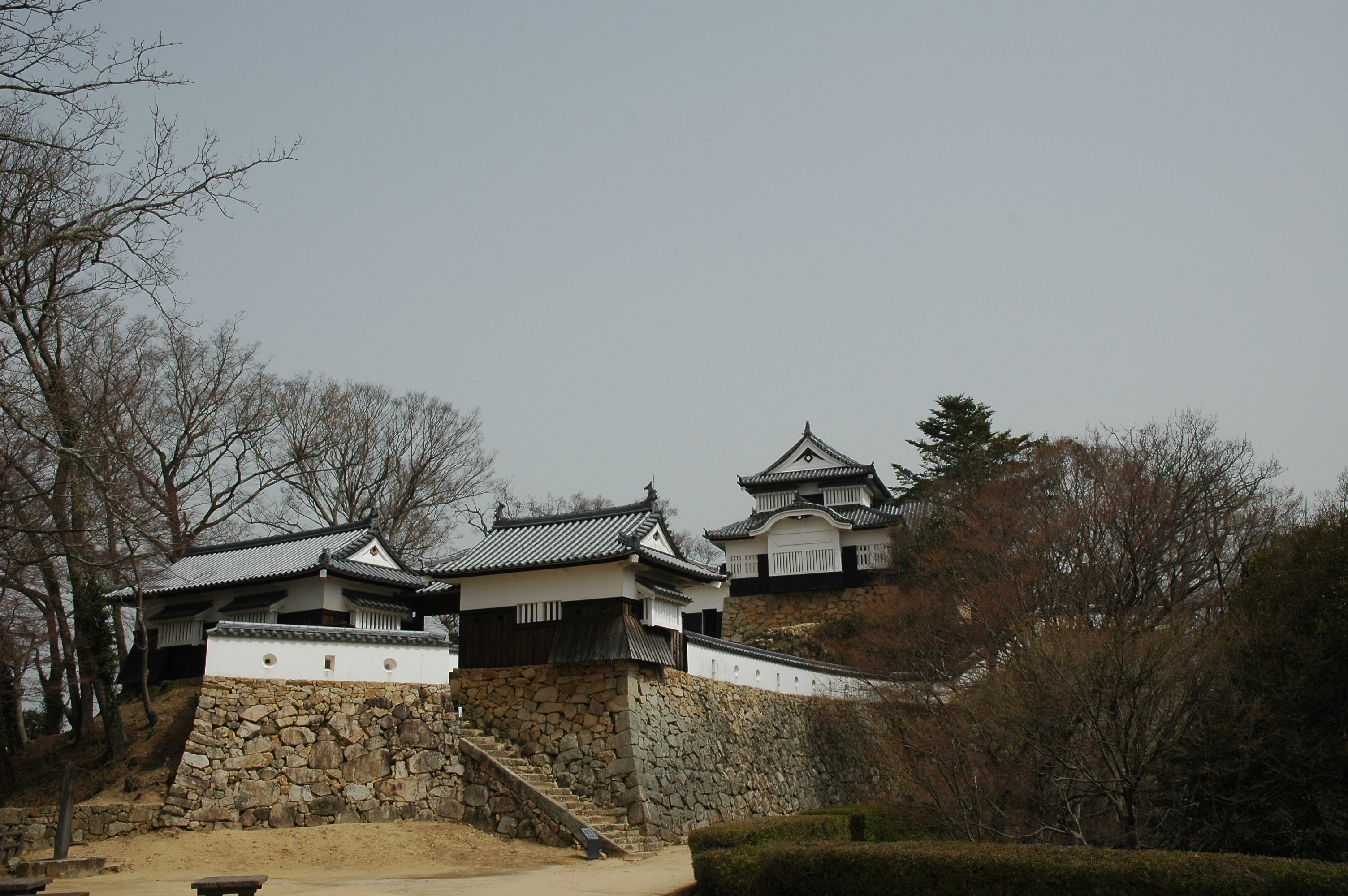

Site information
- Type: yamashiro castle
- Condition: surviving tenshu and yagura

Location
- Bitchū Matsuyama Castle Bitchū Matsuyama Castle (Japan)
- Coordinates: 34°48′32.68″N 133°37′20.29″E

Site history
- Built: 1331, rebuilt early Edo Period
- In use: Muromachi - Edo Period
- Demolished: 1874–1875

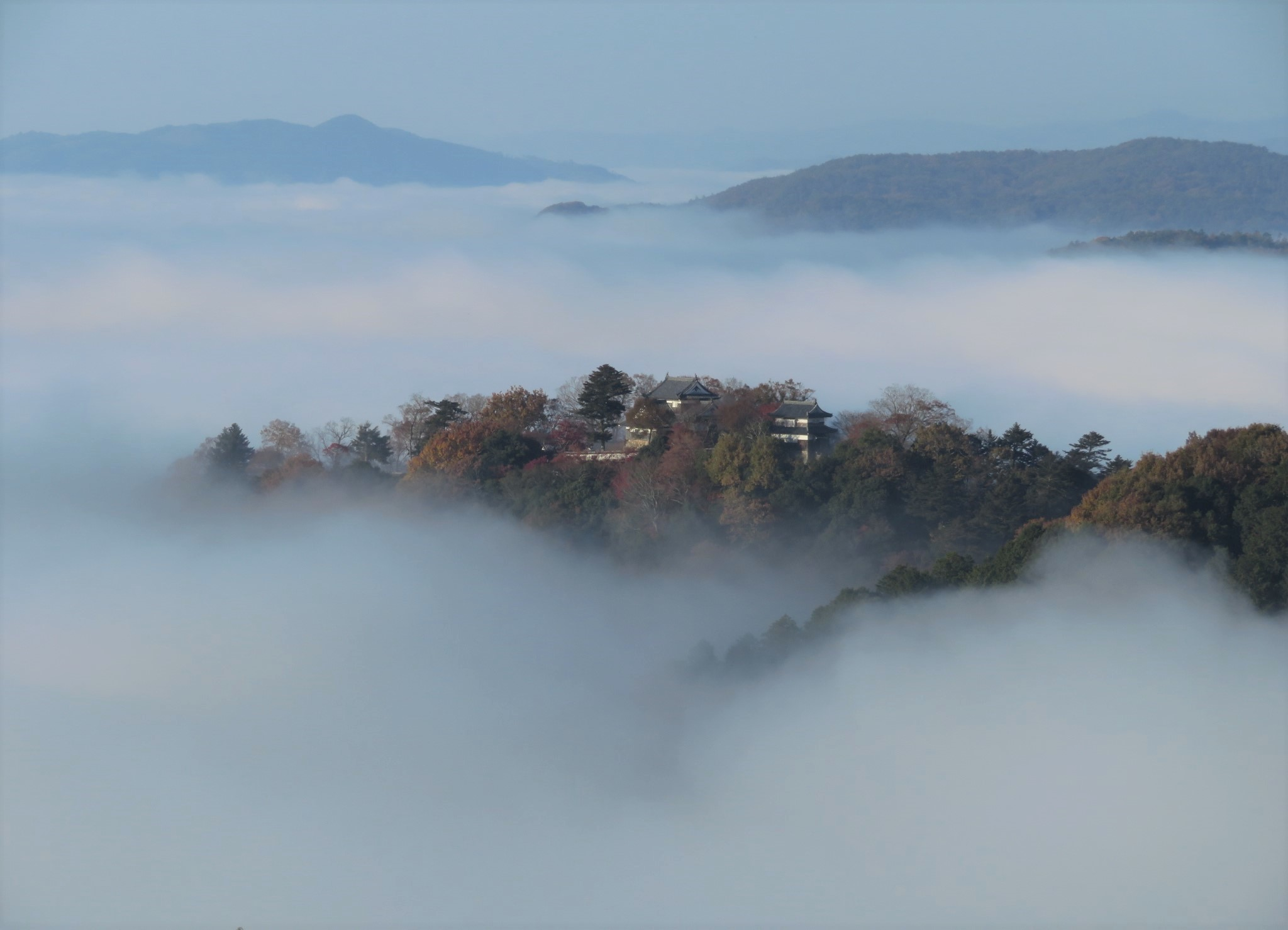
The castle floating on a sea of clouds

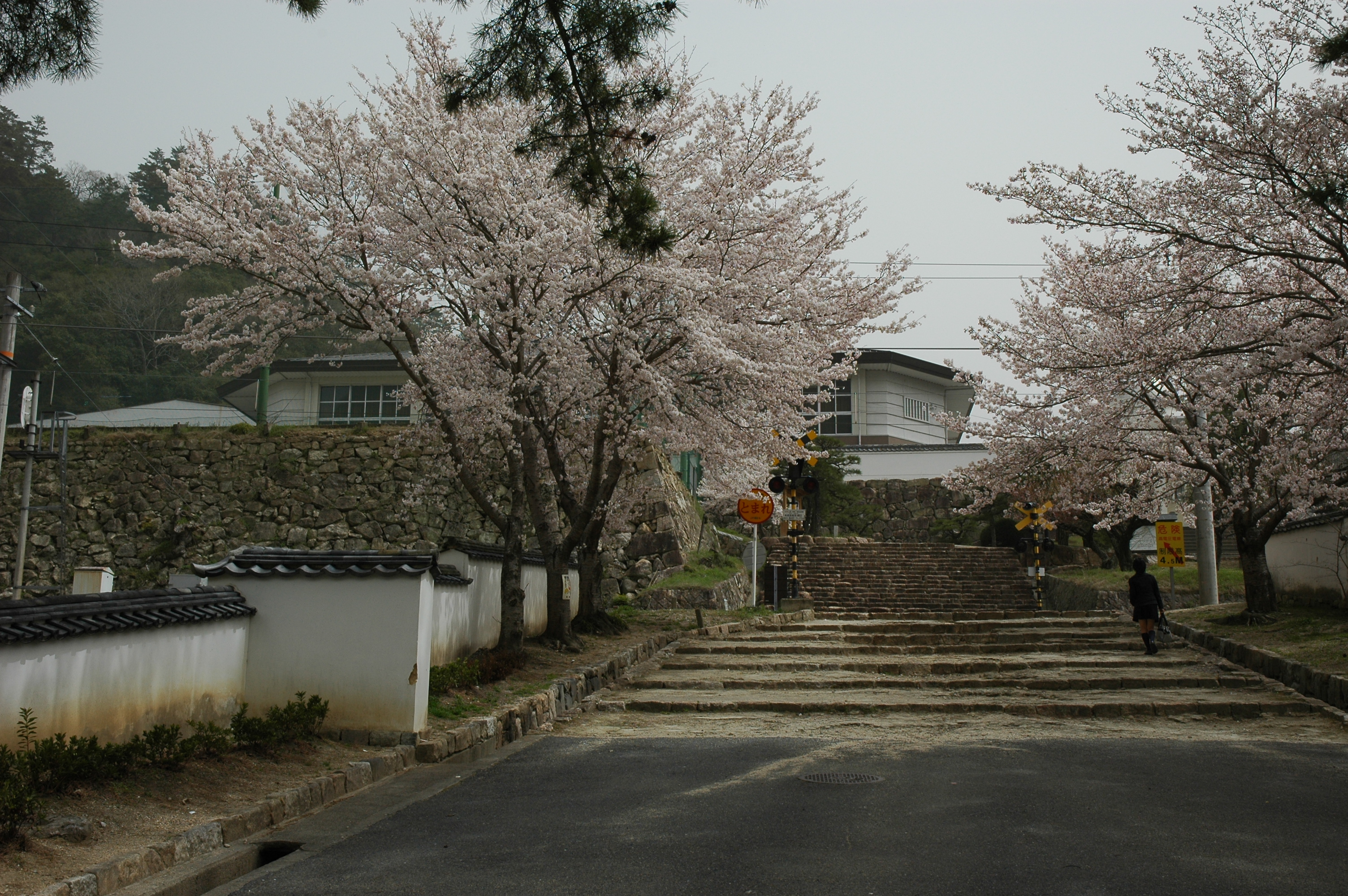
The site of the daimyō palace (now Okayama Prefectural Takahashi High School)

Bitchū Matsuyama Castle (備中松山城, Bitchū Matsuyama-jō), also known as Takahashi Castle (高梁城), is a Japanese castle located in the city of Takahashi, Okayama Prefecture, in the San'yō region of Japan. Along with having one of only twelve remaining original tenshu (main keeps) in the country, Bitchū Matsuyama Castle is notable as the castle with the highest elevation above sea level in Japan at 430 meters (1410 ft). It has been protected by the central government as a National Historic Site since 1956.

== History ==
A fortification was originally built on a nearby mountain (Mount Omatsu) in 1240 AD by Akiba Shigenobu, but its details are not clear. In the Muromachi period, the Hosokawa clan was shugo of Bitchū Province, but ruled through local proxies. Takahashi Muneyasu constructed a new castle at the current location on Mount Gagyū in 1331, though the design of this castle differed from the one that stands on the site now. Mount Gagyū is located north of the center of modern Takahashi, and is a long ridge with an elevation of approximately 430 meters, overlooking the Takahashi River. The location is of strategic importance in controlling the north-south transportation route between the Seto Inland Sea and the San'in region on the Sea of Japan, and the east-west transportation route between Tsuyama in Mimasaka Province and Miyoshi in the center of the Chūgoku region.

In the early Sengoku period, the Shō clan supplanted the Hosokawa and occupied Bitchū Matsuyama Castle in 1532, making it their stronghold in their campaign against the Amago clan in Izumo Province. By the mid-century, the Mōri clan from Aki Province had defeated the Amago while simultaneously supporting the Mimura clan against the Shō and the Ukita clans. Mimura Iechika (1517–1566) captured Bitchū Matsuyama Castle from the Shō in 1561, but was soon assassinated by Ukita Naoie in 1566. His son, Mimura Motochika recaptured the castle in 1571 and greatly enlarged it, extending the site to cover the entire mountain. With assistance from the Mōri clan, Mimura Motochika conquered the whole Bitchū area. After the Mōri clan made peace with the Ukita clan, Motochika entered into secret communications with Oda Nobunaga, and when this betrayal came to light he was besieged in the castle by the combined forces of the Mōri clan and the Ukita clan in 1574. The castle fell to the Mōri clan in 1575 and the Mimura clan was extinguished.

In 1600, following the Battle of Sekigahara, the Mōri clan were deprived of Bitchū Province and were forced to cede the castle to Tokugawa Ieyasu. He retained the castle as directly-ruled tenryō territory and appointed Kobori Masatsugu as daikan. His son, Kobori Masakazu is better known as Kobori Enshū, the famed tea master and garden designer. In 1617, he was transferred to Ōmi Province and Ikeda Nagayoshi of a cadet branch of the Ikeda clan was appointed daimyō of the newly created Bitchū-Matsuyama Domain. After his son died without heir in 1641, the domain went to Mizunoya Katsutaka, who rebuilt the tenshu, yagura turrets and gates in addition to rebuilding the castle town. The tenshu was unusual in that it was only two stories tall and is smaller than a typical corner yagura in many large castles, though a larger tenshu along the lines of Himeji Castle's would have been unnecessary as Bitchū Matsuyama Castle was located on a mountain, thus allowing a large field of vision. The daimyō palace was constructed at the base of the mountain. The Mizunoya clan ruled until 1695. After passing through brief periods under Andō clan and the Ishikawa clan, the domain and castle were ruled by a cadet branch of the Itakura clan for eight generations from 1744 to the Meiji restoration in 1871.

In the Meiji period, the castle was partly destroyed, but the rest of it was abandoned and slowly fell into disrepair. In 1929, a citizens' group was established and restoration work was begun on the castle. Three structures were saved and still stand today: a short section of wall, the Nijū yagura, and the tenshu.

== Current situation ==
The three surviving structures of the castle were designated National Important Cultural Properties in 1941. From 1957 to 1960, restoration work was sponsored by the government, and the castle is noteworthy in that it is the only yamashiro, or mountain castle, to have an original tenshu. The castle is on a mountain and the road up to the summit does not go all the way, so to get to the castle, one must hike up a mountain path.

Bitchū-Matsuyama Castle was listed as one of Japan's Top 100 Castles by the Japan Castle Foundation in 2006.

In December 2018, a local cat named Sanjuro was installed as the honorary "lord" of the castle. Sanjūrō (さんじゅーろー), named after local samurai Tani Sanjūrō, originally belonged to Megumi Nanba but had run away on July 14, 2018 after torrential rains brought floods and mudslides in the area. The cat was later found living in the castle by one of the workers, who started feeding it. The presence of Sanjūrō, who was first made a provisional mascot before being named as "lord", has helped increase the number of visitors to the castle.

== Gallery ==
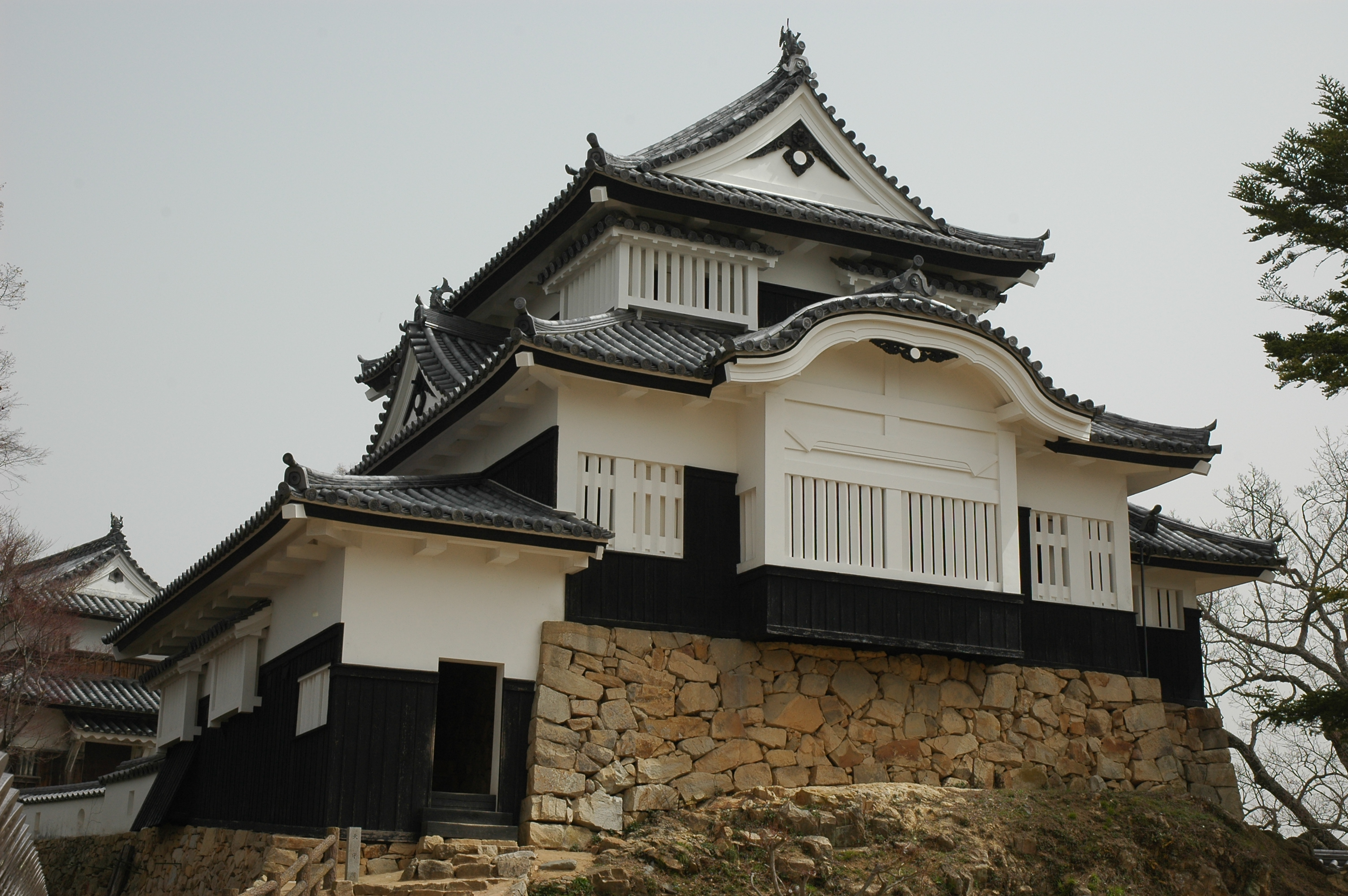
The tenshu of Bitchū Matsuyama castle.

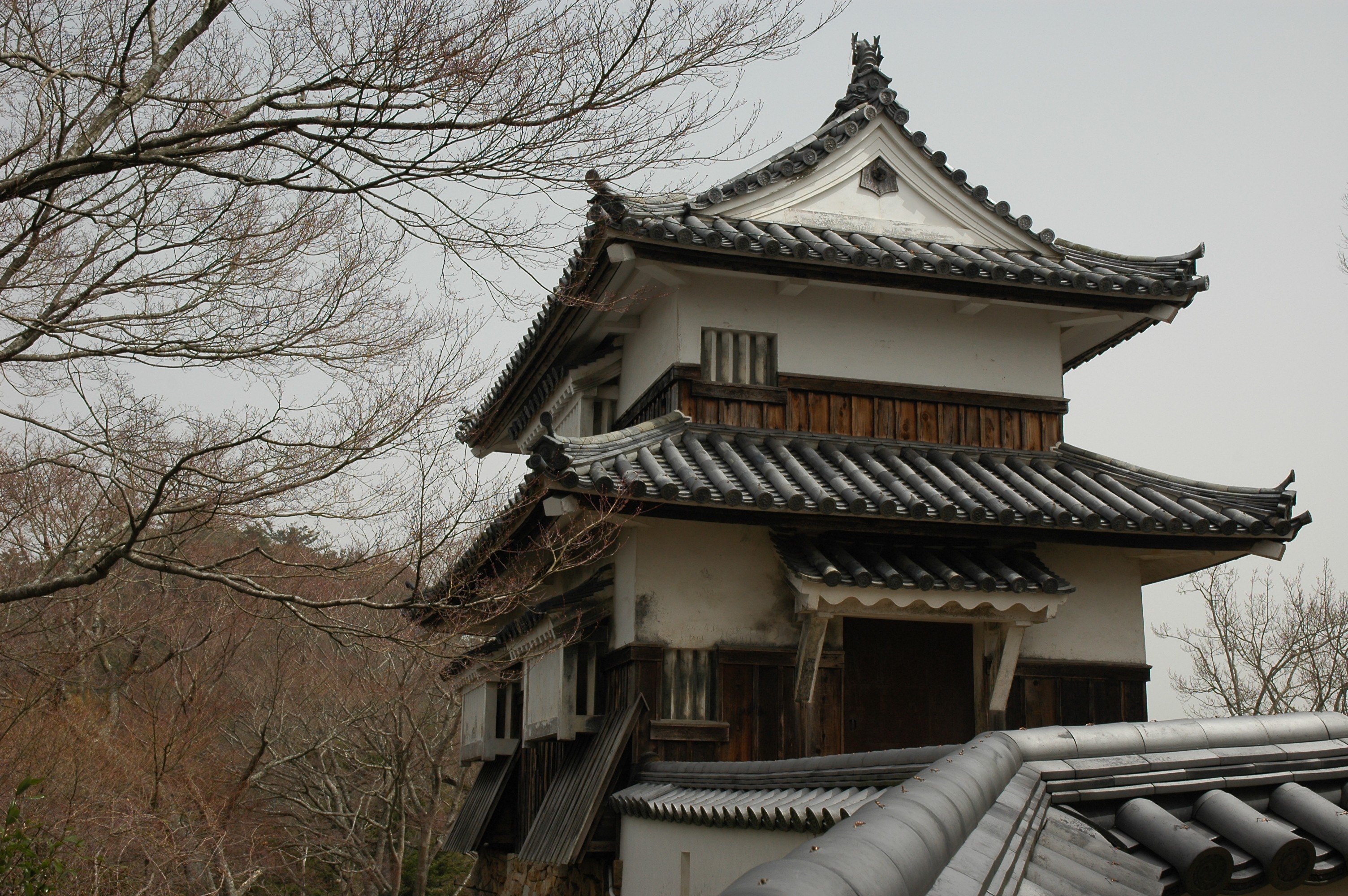
The Nijū yagura

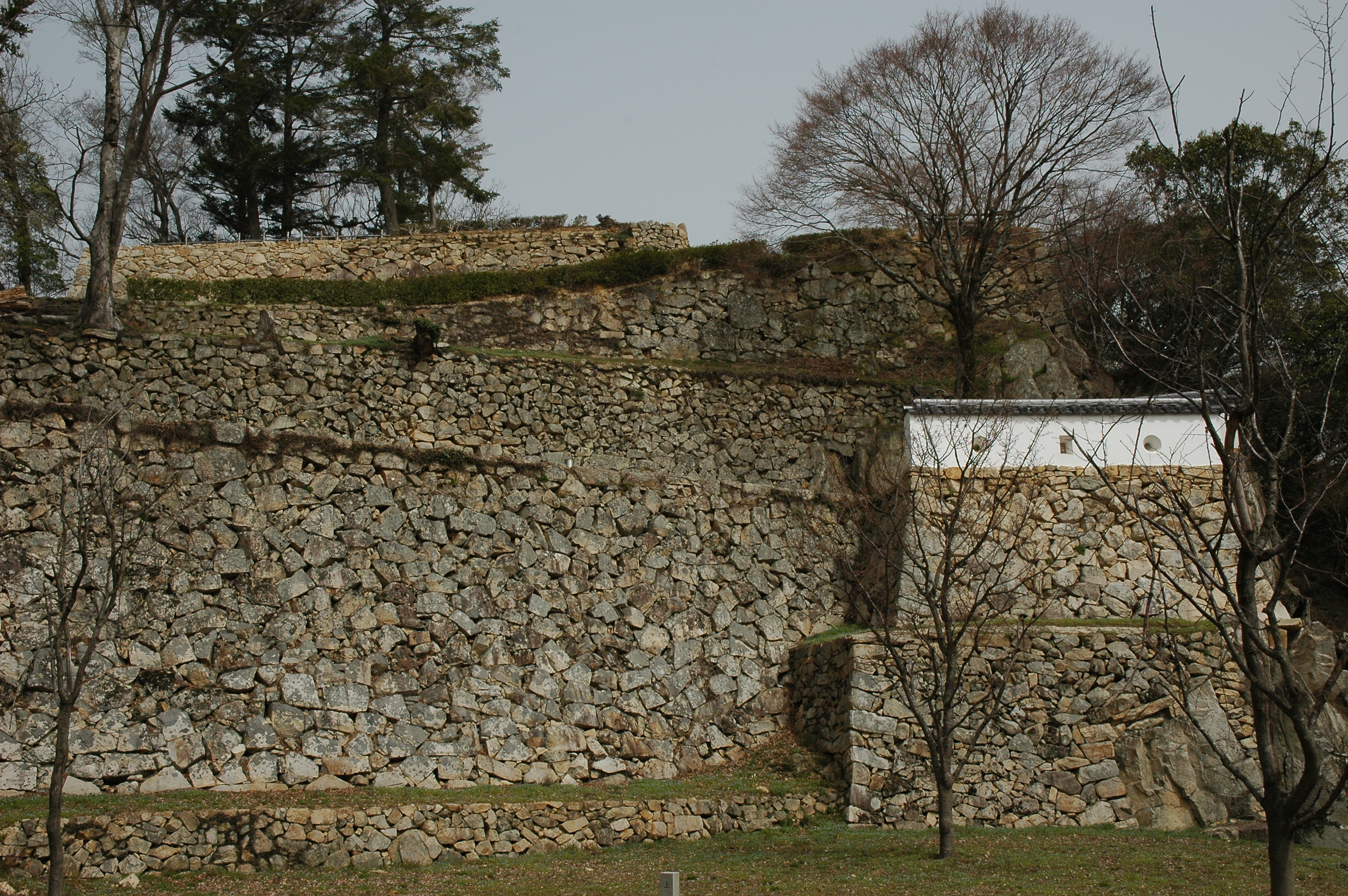
The levels going up the slope can be seen.

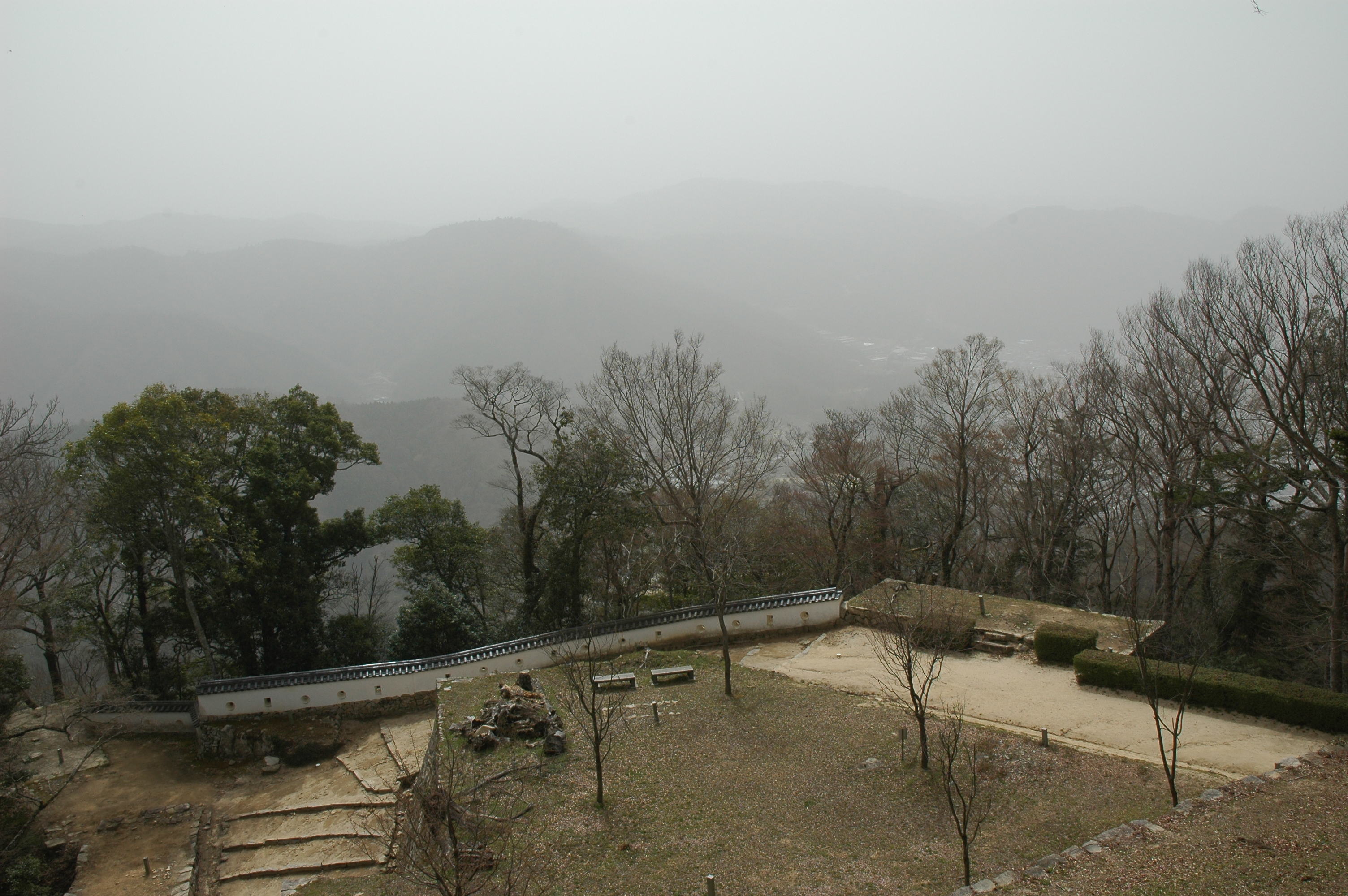
The section of original wall that remains, along with the commanding view from the castle.

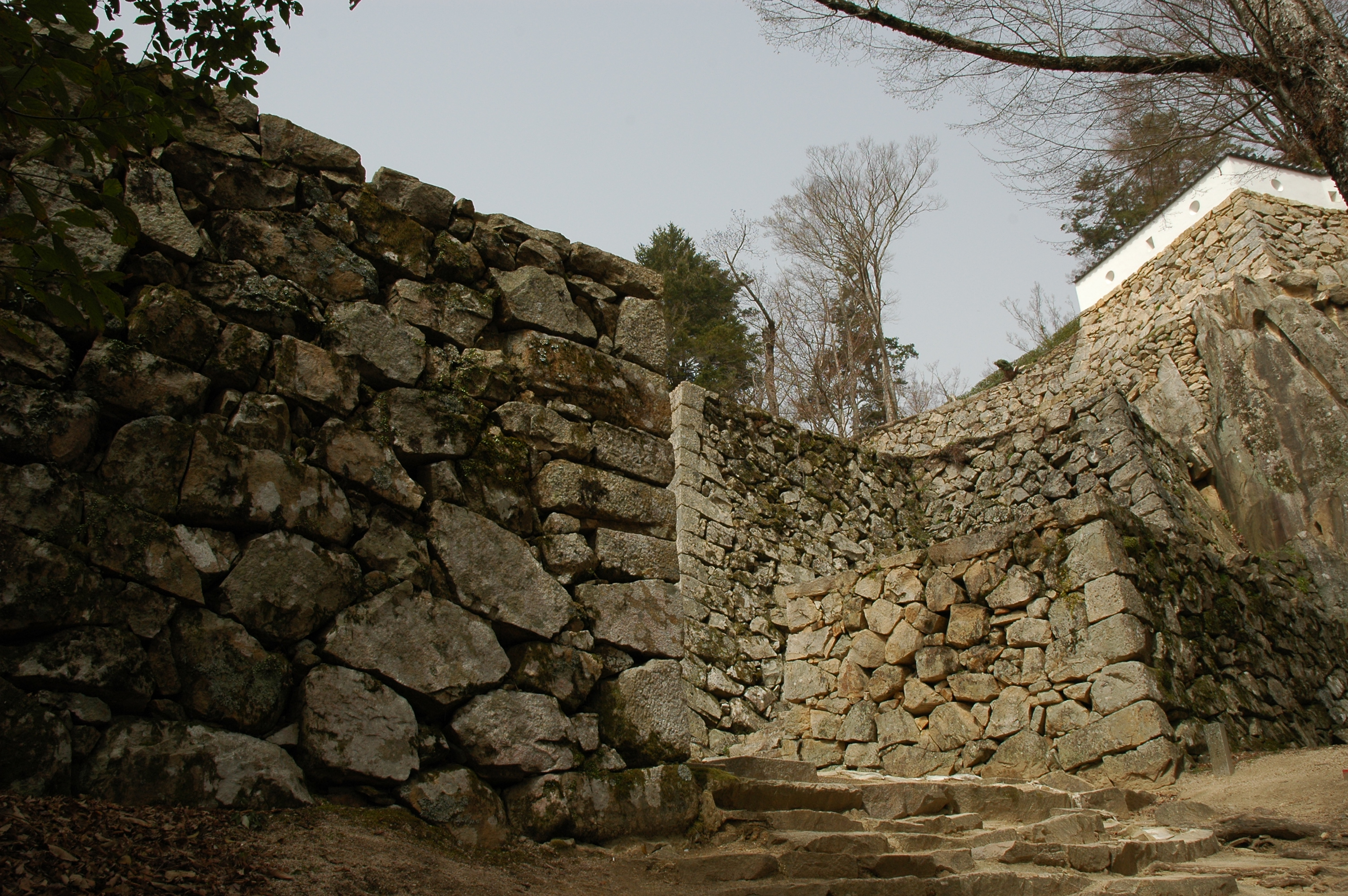
The successive levels of walls can easily be seen.

== See also ==
- List of Historic Sites of Japan (Okayama)
- Bitchū-Matsuyama Domain

== Literature ==
- De Lange, William (2021). An Encyclopedia of Japanese Castles. Groningen: Toyo Press. pp. 600 pages. ISBN 978-9492722300.
- Mitchelhill, Jennifer (2013). Castles of the Samurai:Power & Beauty. USA: Kodansha. ISBN 978-1568365121.
- Schmorleitz, Morton S. (1974). Castles in Japan. Tokyo: Charles E. Tuttle Co. ISBN 0-8048-1102-4.
- Samurai-Archives: Mimura Motochika
