= Fukushima Domain =

Edo Period Domain in Japan

Fukushima Domain 福島藩
- under Tokugawa shogunate Japan
- 1679–1871
- Capital: Fukushima Castle
- Area
  - Coordinates: 37°45′2″N 140°29′8″E
  - Type: Daimyō
- Historical era: Edo period
  - Established: 1679
  - Honda: 1679
  - tenryō: 1682
  - Hotta: 1686
  - tenryō: 1700
  - Itakura: 1702
  - Disestablished: 1871
- Today part of: part of Fukushima Prefecture

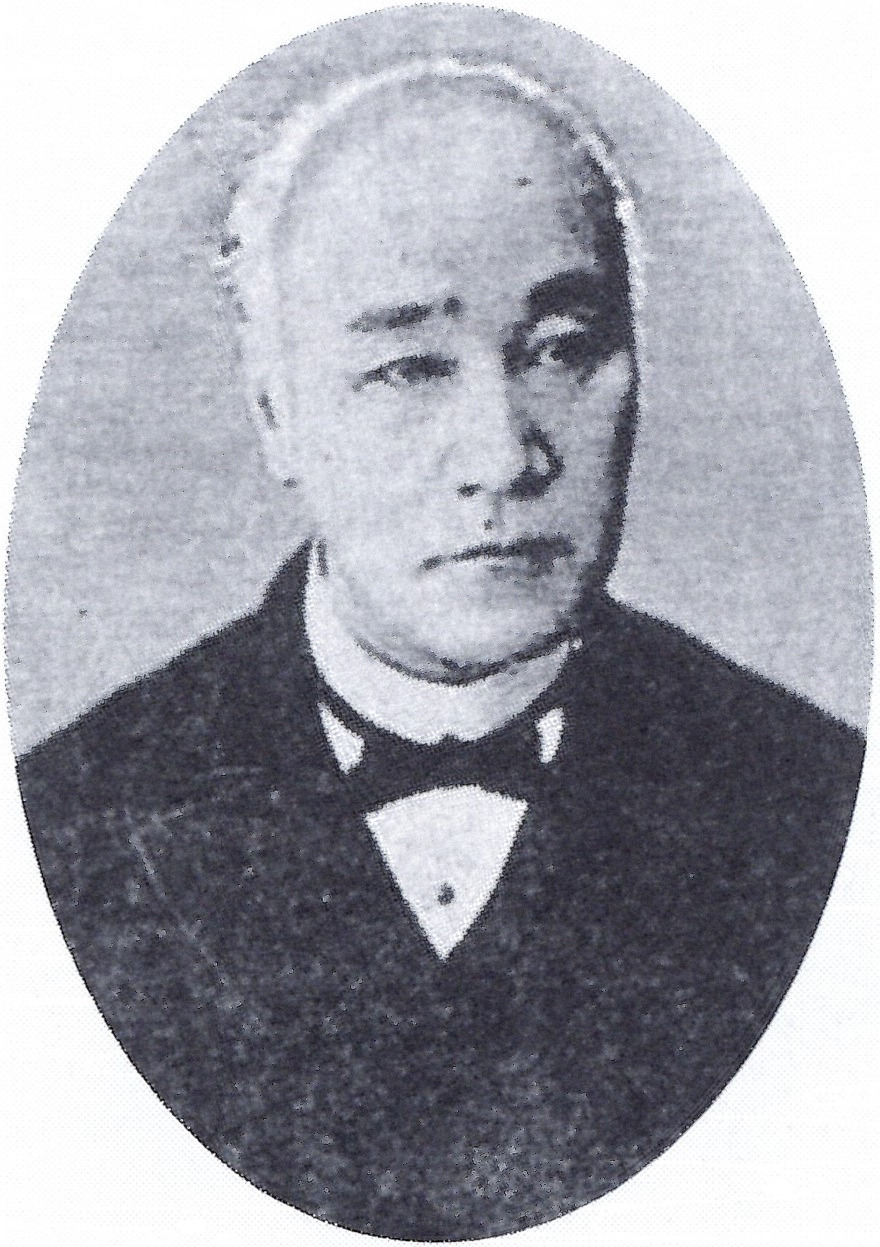
Itakura Katsusato, final daimyō of Fukushima Domain

Fukushima Domain (福島藩, Fukushima-han) was a fudai feudal domain under the Tokugawa shogunate of Edo period Japan, located in southern Mutsu Province. It was centered on Fukushima Castle in what is now the city of Fukushima in Fukushima Prefecture. For the majority of its history it was ruled by a branch of the Itakura clan.

== History ==
The area around Fukushima in the Muromachi period was part of the territory of the Date clan. Date Mochimune built Daibutsu Castle (大仏城, Daibutsu-jō) on the site of present Fukushima Castle in 1413. In 1592, the area came under the control of Gamō Ujisato, and renamed the castle "Fukushima Castle". In 1600, the Battle of Matsukawa took place outside the castle. Following the establishment of the Tokugawa shogunate, Fukushima was the centre of a tenryō territory with a kokudaka of 200,000 koku. In 1679, Honda Tadakuni was transferred from Yamato-Koriyama Domain, marking the start of Fukushima Domain. However, he only ruled for three years before being transferred to Himeji Domain. Fukushima Domain was re-established in 1686 for Hotta Masanaka, formerly of Yamagata Domain. His son, Hotta Masatora was transferred back to Yamagata in 1700. Fukushima Domain was once again revived in 1702 for Itakura Shigehiro, formerly of Itaki Domain in Shinano Province. This cadet branch of the Itakura clan continued to rule Fukushima until the Meiji restoration.

During the Bakumatsu period, with the start of the Boshin War, the domain joined the Ōuetsu Reppan Dōmei; however, its support of the Tokugawa cause was lukewarm, and upon hearing of the fall of neighbouring Nihonmatsu Castle to the Satchō Alliance, the 11th daimyō, Itakura Katsumi, surrendered the castle without a fight. His successor, Itakura Katsusato, moved his seat from Fukushima to a small exclave controlled by the domain at Shigehara in Mikawa Province in 1869. he was later granted the kazoku title of shishaku (viscount) and served as a member of the House of Peers in the Meiji government.

After the abolition of the han system in July 1871, Fukushima Domain became part of Fukushima Prefecture.

== Holdings at the end of the Edo period ==
As with most domains in the han system, Fukushima Domain consisted of several discontinuous territories calculated to provide the assigned kokudaka, based on periodic cadastral surveys and projected agricultural yields.

- Mutsu Province (Iwashiro Province)
  - 19 villages in Shinobu District
- Kazusa Province
  - 4 villages in Yamabe District
- Mikawa Province
- ? villages in Hazu District

== List of daimyō ==
#	Name	Tenure	Courtesy title	Court Rank	kokudaka	Notes
Honda clan (fudai) 1679–1682
1	Honda Tadakuni (本多忠国)	1679–1682	Nakatsukasa-daiyu (中務大輔) Jijū(侍従)	Junior 4th Rank, Lower Grade (従四位下)	150,000 koku	Transfer from Yamato-Kōriyama Domain transfer to Himeji Domain
tenryō 1682-1686
Hotta clan (fudai) 1686-1700
1	Hotta Masanaka (堀田正仲)	1686-1694	Shimōsa-no-kami (下総守)	Junior 5th Rank, Lower Grade (従五位下)	100,000 koku	Transfer from Yamagata Domain
2	Hotta Masatora (堀田正虎)	1694-1700	Izu-no-kami (伊豆守)	Junior 5th Rank, Lower Grade (従五位下)	100,000 koku	Transfer to Yamagata Domain
tenryō 1700-1702
Itakura clan (fudai) 1702-1868
1	Itakura Shigehiro (板倉重寛)	1702-1717	Kai-no-kami (甲斐守)	Junior 5th Rank, Lower Grade (従五位下)	30,000 koku	Transfer from Itaki Domain
2	Itakura Shigeyasu (板倉重泰)	1717-1718	Izumo-no-kami (出雲守)	Junior 5th Rank, Lower Grade (従五位下)	30,000 koku	
3	Itakura Katsusato (板倉勝里)	1718-1743	Kai-no-kami (甲斐守)	Junior 5th Rank, Lower Grade (従五位下)	30,000 koku	
4	Itakura Katsutsugu (板倉勝承)	1743-1765	Naizen-no-kami (内膳正)	Junior 5th Rank, Lower Grade (従五位下)	30,000 koku	
5	Itakura Katsutō (板倉勝任)	1765-1766	-none-	-none-	30,000 koku	
6	Itakura Katsuyuki (板倉勝行)	1766-1773	Bitchu-no-kami (備中守)	Junior 5th Rank, Lower Grade (従五位下)	30,000 koku	
7	Itakura Katsunori (板倉勝矩)	1773-1775	Kawachi-no-kami (河内守)	Junior 5th Rank, Lower Grade (従五位下)	30,000 koku	
8	Itakura Katsunaga (板倉勝長)	1775-1815	Naizen-no-kami (内膳正)	Junior 5th Rank, Lower Grade (従五位下)	30,000 koku	
9	Itakura Katsutoshi (板倉勝俊)	1815-1834	Kai-no-kami (甲斐守)	Junior 5th Rank, Lower Grade (従五位下)	30,000 koku	
10	Itakura Katsuaki (板倉勝顕)	1834-1866	Naizen-no-kami (内膳正)	Junior 5th Rank, Lower Grade (従五位下)	30,000 koku	
11	Itakura Katsumi (板倉勝己)	1866-1868	Kai-no-kami (甲斐守)	Junior 5th Rank, Lower Grade (従五位下)	30,000 koku	
12	Itakura Katsusato (板倉勝達)	1866-1868	Naizen-no-kami (内膳正)	Junior 5th Rank, Lower Grade (従五位下)	30,000 koku	transfer to Shigehara Domain

=== Itakura Shigehiro ===
Itakura Shigehiro (板倉重寛, February 1, 1669-September 8, 1721) was the 1st Itakura daimyō of Fukushima Domain. He was the eldest son of Itakura Shigetane, the daimyō of Sakaki Domain in Shinano Province. His wife was the daughter of Mizuno Tadanao of Matsumoto Domain. Due to an O-Ie Sōdō in 1683, Shōgun Tokugawa Tsunayoshi forced Shigetane to retire and divided Sakaki Domain between his two sons, with 30,000 koku to Shigehiro and the remaining 20,000 koku to Shigehiro’s younger brother Shigenobu. In 1702, Shigehiro was transferred to Fukushima Domain. He retired in 1717 and died in 1721 at the age of 53.

=== Itakura Shigeyasu ===
Itakura Shigeyasu (板倉重泰, June 20, 1691-December 15, 1718) was the 2nd Itakura daimyō of Fukushima Domain. He was the eldest son of Itakura Shigehiro. He became daimyō in 1717 on the retirement of his father; however, he predeceased his father in 1718 without heir.

=== Itakura Katsusato ===
Itakura Katsusato (板倉勝里, November 3, 1706-September 9, 1743) was the 3rd Itakura daimyō of Fukushima Domain. He was the younger son of Takagi Masanobu of Tannan Dommain in Kawachi Province. He was adopted as a posthumous son of Itakura Shigeyasu after the latter died without male heir in 1717 and was confirmed as daimyō in 1718. His wife was the daughter of Sōma Masatane of Sōma Nakamura Domain. During his tenure, he served five times in the guard of Osaka Castle. He died in 1743.

=== Itakura Katsutsugu ===
Itakura Katsutsugu (板倉勝承, August 18, 1735-May 15, 1765) was the 4th Itakura daimyō of Fukushima Domain. He was the eldest son of Itakura Katsusato and became daimyō on his father’s death in 1743. His wife was the daughter of Kyōgoku Takanori of Marugame Domain. His tenure was marked with repeated peasant uprisings. He died without heir in 1765 and the domain went to his younger brother.

=== Itakura Katsutō ===
Itakura Katsutō (板倉勝任, January 16, 1737-August 12, 1766) was the 5th Itakura daimyō of Fukushima Domain. He was the younger brother of Itakura Katsutsugu and became daimyō on the latter’s death in 1765. However, he died only a year later without wife or heir before his formal investiture, and thus had no formal court rank or courtesy titles.

=== Itakura Katsuyuki ===
Itakura Katsuyuki (板倉勝行, October 9, 1752-August 2, 1773) was the 6th Itakura daimyō of Fukushima Domain. On the death of Itakura Katsutō without heir in 1766, the fourth son of Itakura Katsuzumi of Bitchū-Matsuyama Domain was invited to become daimyō. He served one term in the guard of Osaka Castle. However, as with his predecessor, he died in 1773 without wife or heir.

=== Itakura Katsunori ===
Itakura Katsunori (板倉勝矩, June 16, 1742-January 17, 1776) was the 7th Itakura daimyō of Fukushima Domain. On the death of Itakura Katsuyuki without heir in 1773, the fourth son of Itakura Katsukiyo of Annaka Domain in Kōzuke Province was invited to become daimyō. Although he had no official wife, he had five sons by concubines. However, as with his predecessors, he died in 1776 after only a short time in office.

=== Itakura Katsunaga ===
Itakura Katsunaga (板倉勝長, August 25, 1761-May 20, 1815) was the 8th Itakura daimyō of Fukushima Domain. The second son of Itakura Katsunori, he became daimyo on his father’s death i in 1776, and was received in formal audience by Shōgun Tokugawa Ieharu. His wife was the daughter of Wakazaka Yasuchika of Tatsuno Domain. His tenure was marked by famine in Fukushima, and a fire which destroyed Osaka Castle while he was stationed there as a guard. He requested the assistance of advisors from Sōma Nakamura Domain to help with reforms. He died in 1815.

=== Itakura Katsutoshi ===
Itakura Katsutoshi (板倉勝俊, October 7, 1788-September 28, 1841) was the 9th Itakura daimyō of Fukushima Domain. The eldest son of Itakura Katsunaga, he became daimyō on his father’s death in 1815. His wife was the daughter of Uesugi Haruhiro of Yonezawa Domain. He attempted to revive domain finances, including the opening a market to encourage the development of local products, but was opposed by the domain karō in Edo, who arranged to have him deposed in 1834. He died in 1841.

=== Itakura Katsuaki ===
Itakura Katsuaki (板倉勝顕, June 20, 1814-January 8, 1877) was the 10th Itakura daimyō of Fukushima Domain. The eldest son of Itakura Katsutoshi, he became daimyō on his father’s forced retirement in 1834. His wife was the daughter of Uesugi Narisada of Yonezawa Domain. With the opening of Japan to foreign trade per the Harris Treaty of 1858, he was able to restore the domain’s finances to a strong state through encouragement of the export of silk. He retired in 1866 in favor of his eldest son, but continued to rule behind-the-scenes until and his death in 1877.

=== Itakura Katsumi ===
Itakura Katsumi (板倉勝己, April 22, 1851-November 20, 1924) was the 11th Itakura daimyō of Fukushima Domain. The eldest son of Itakura Katsuaki, he became daimyō on his father’s retirement in 1866. His wife was the daughter of Okabe Nagahiro of Kishiwada Domain. In March 1868, he was ordered by the shogunate to relocate to Edo to bolster its defences in the Boshin War, but soon defected to the Meiji government and was ordered to return to Fukushima, and to assist in the Battle of Aizu. However, there was much sentiment in the domain in favor of the Ōuetsu Reppan Dōmei, and after the assassination of Sara Shūzō, the arrogant envoy of the Satchō Alliance, Fukushima defected back to the pro-Tokugawa side. The Meiji government took Nihonmatsu Castle a few months later, and Itakura Katsumi surrendered Fukushima Castle without a fight and fled to Yonezawa. The former daimyō, Itakura Katsuaki then formally surrendered to the Meiji government. In October 1868, he was summoned to Tokyo and ordered to retire. He was officially pardoned the following year, and died in 1924.

=== Itakura Katsusato ===
Itakura Katsusato (板倉勝達, June 11, 1839-July 1, 1913) was the 12th and final Itakura daimyō of Fukushima Domain. The grandson son of Itakura Katsunaga, he became daimyō on Itakura Katsumi’s forced retirement in 1868. On January 24, 1869, the Meiji government seized the domain’s territories in Fukushima in exchange for an equal kokudaka of territory in Ōnuma District, Fukushima, in former Aizu Domain territory. However, Katsusato refused to relocate to this new territory and instead shifted his seat to a minor holding the domain held in Mikawa Province. Fukushima Domain was officially renamed Shigehara Domain (重原藩). The abolition of the han system came two years later, in 1871. Itakura Katsusato joined the Ministry of Justice in 1869, and was appointed a prosecutor in the courts of Gunma Prefecture in 1873. He also held a post in the Imperial Household Ministry from 1877 and the Ministry of Agriculture and Commerce from 1882. He became a viscount (shishaku) in the kazoku peerage system in 1884, and served as a member of the House of Peers from 1890 to 1911.

== See also ==
- List of Han
