= Niwase Domain =

Administrative division in western Japan during the Edo period (1617-1871)

Niwase Domain 庭瀬藩
- Domain of Japan
- 1615–1871
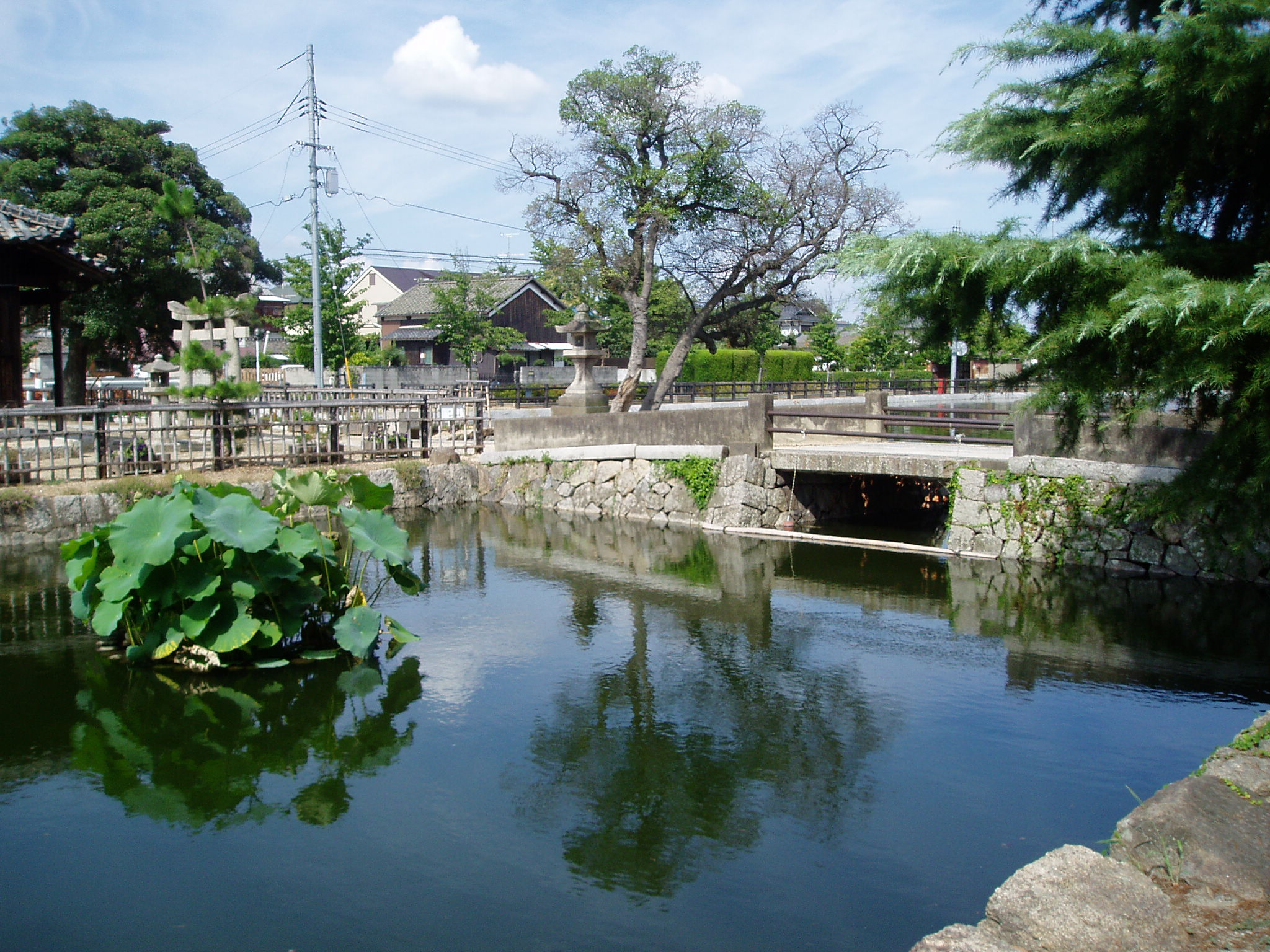
- Site of Niwase Castle

- Mon of the Itakura clan
- Capital: Niwase jin'ya
- Area
  - Coordinates: 34°38′34.1″N 133°50′57″E
- Historical era: Edo period
  - Established: 1615
  - Abolition of the han system: 1871
- Contained within
  - Province: Bitchū Province
- Today part of: Okayama Prefecture

Location of Niwase jin'ya
Niwase Domain (Japan)

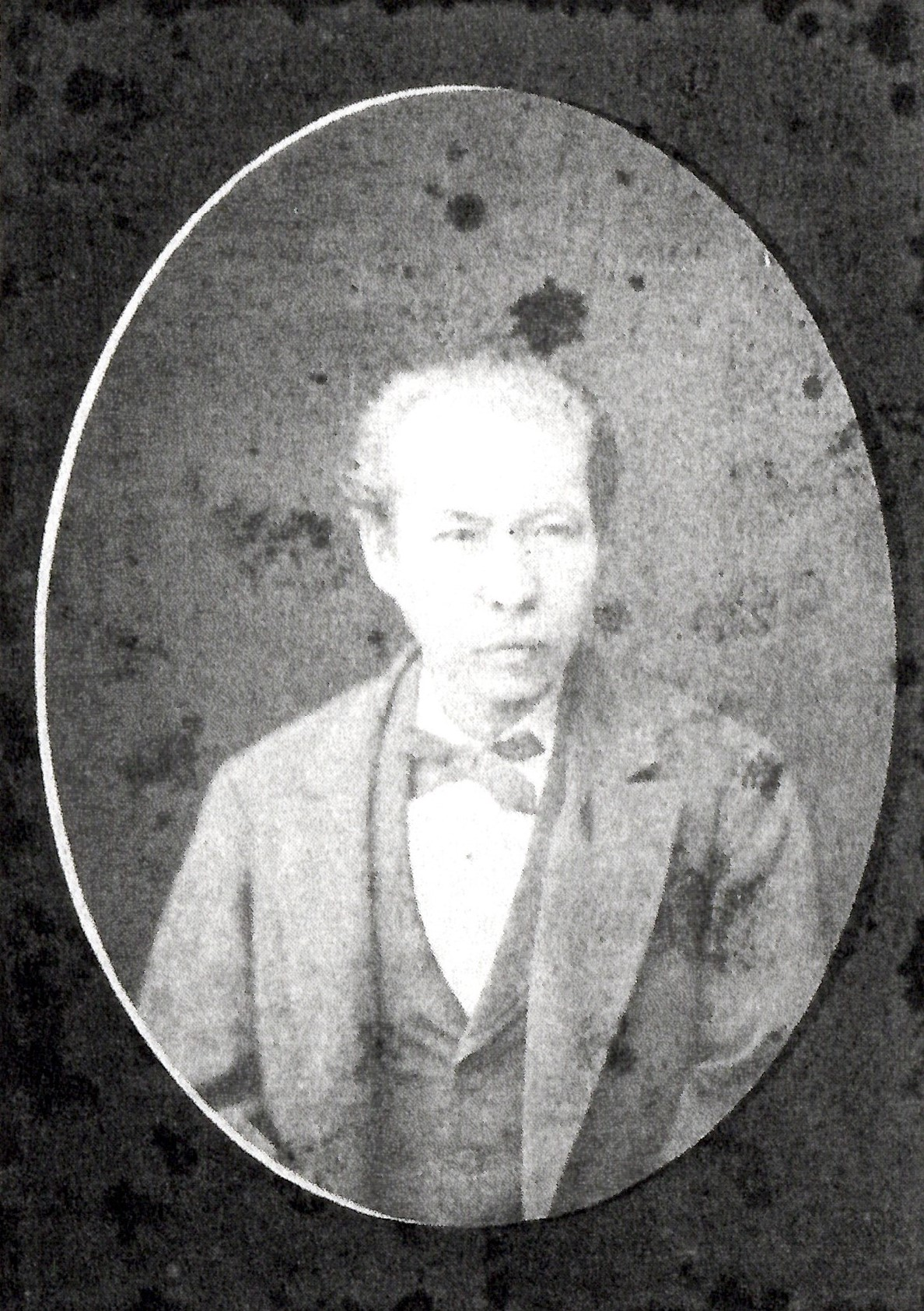
Itakura Katsuhiro, last ruler of Niwase Domain

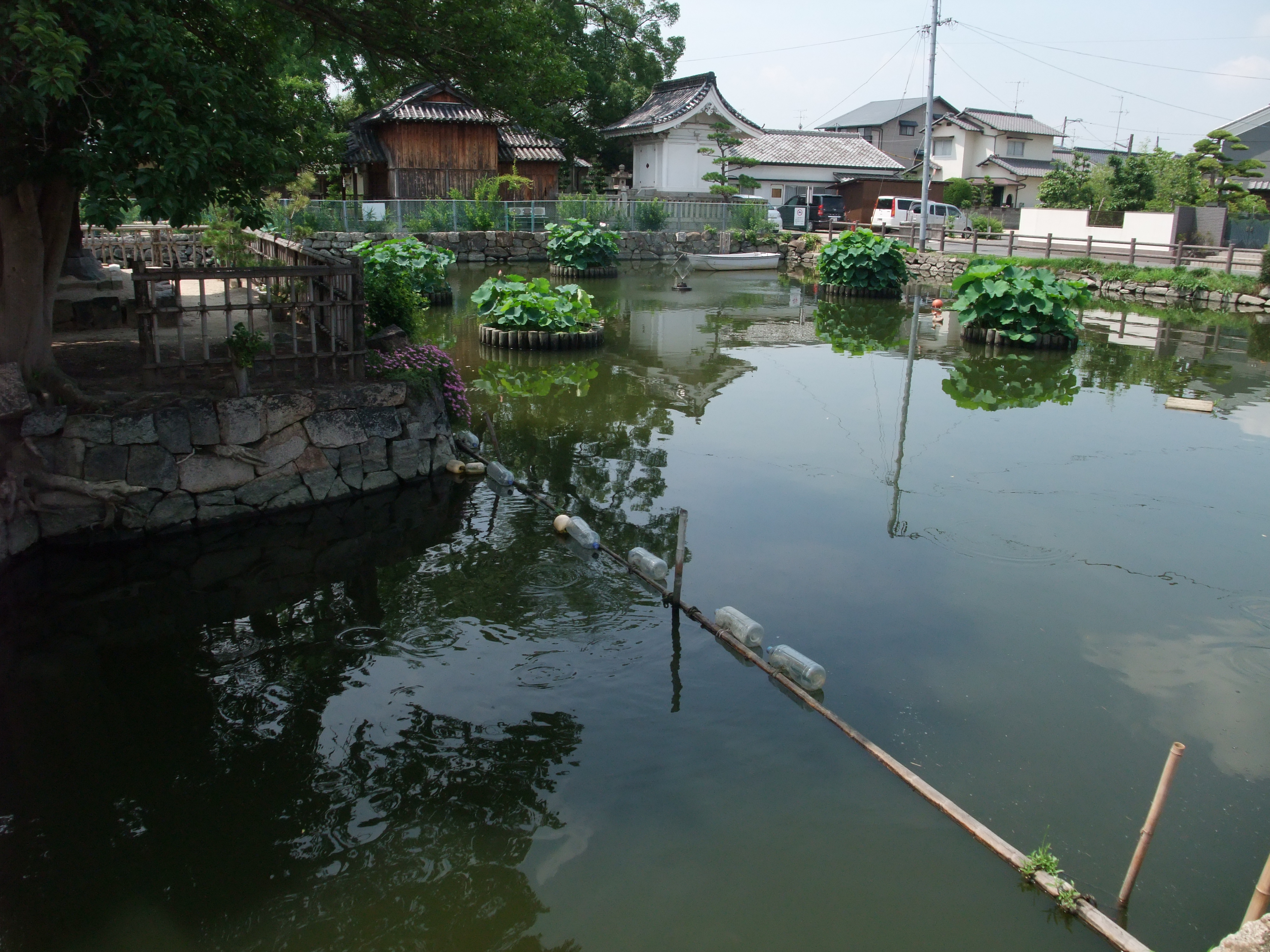
Remnant of moats of Niwase Castle

Niwase Domain (庭瀬藩, Niwase-han) was a feudal domain under the Tokugawa shogunate of Edo period Japan, in what is now central Okayama Prefecture. It controlled a small portion of eastern Bitchū Province and was centered around Niwase jin'ya in what is now Kita-ku, Okayama. It was ruled for most its history by a branch of the Itakura clan. It was dissolved in the abolition of the han system in 1871 and is now part of Okayama Prefecture.Inukai Tsuyoshi, who became Prime Minister of Japan, was from Niwase Domain.

== History ==
In 1600, Togawa Michiyasu, a vassal of Ukita Hideie had a falling out with his overlord and defected to the Eastern Army in the Battle of Sekigahara. As a result, he was awarded a 29,200 koku domain by Tokugawa Ieyasu and established his seat at Niwase Castle. The clan ruled for four generations, with each generation whittling down its patrimony through donations to younger brothers, leaving the 4th daimyō, Togawa Yasukaze, with only 20,000 koku before the domain was dissolved through attainder after his death without heir in 1679.

Four years later, in 1683, Kuze Shigeyuki from the Sekiyado Domain in Shimōsa Province revived the domain at 50,000 koku but as his status was not that of a "castle-holding daimyō", he set up a jin'ya in the Ni-no-Maru Bailey of former Niwase Castle. In 1686, he was transferred to Tanba-Kameyama Domain in Tanba Province. Seven years later, in 1693, Matsudaira Nobumichi from Kodome Domain in Yamato Province revived the domain, albeit at a kokudaka of 30,000 koku. He was transferred to Kaminoyama Domain in Dewa Province in 1697.

In 1699, Itakura Shigetaka was transferred from Takataki Domain in Kazusa Province, but the kokudaka of the domain was reduced further to 20,000 koku. The Itakura clan ruled for the next 172 years until the end of the Edo period. The domain school, the Sei'ikan (誠意館), was founded in 1818.

In 1871, the domain became "Niwase Prefecture" due to the abolition of the han system. Later, it was incorporated into Okayama Prefecture via Fukatsu and Oda Prefectures. The Itakura family was made a viscount (shishaku ) in the kazoku peerage in 1884.

== Holdings at the end of the Edo period ==
As with most domains in the han system, Niwase Domain consisted of several discontinuous territories calculated to provide the assigned kokudaka, based on periodic cadastral surveys and projected agricultural yields, g.

- Bitchū Province
  - 1 village in Tsuu District
  - 20 villages in Oda District
  - 10 villages in Kaya District

== List of daimyō ==
| # | Name | Tenure | Courtesy title | Court Rank | kokudaka |
|---|---|---|---|---|---|
Togawa clan, 1600-1679 (Tozama)
| 1 | Togawa Michiyasu (戸川達安) | 1600 - 1628 | Higo-no-kami (肥後守) | Junior 5th Rank, Lower Grade (従五位下) | 29,000 koku |
| 2 | Togawa Masayasu (戸川正安) | 1628 - 1669 | Tosa-no-kami (土佐守) | Junior 5th Rank, Lower Grade (従五位下) | 22,500 koku |
| 3 | Togawa Yasunobu (戸川安宣) | 1669 - 1675 | Tosa-no-kami (土佐守) | Junior 5th Rank, Lower Grade (従五位下) | 21,000 koku |
| 4 | Togawa Yasukaze (戸川安風) | 1675 - 1679 | -none- | -none- | 20,000 koku |
Kuze clan, 1683-1686 (Fudai)
| 1 | Kuze Shigeyuki (久世重之) | 1683 - 1686 | Sanuki-no-kami (讃岐守) | Junior 4th Rank, Lower Grade (従四位下) | 50,000 koku |
Fujii-Matsudaira clan, 1693-1697 (Fudai)
| 1 | Matsudaira Nobumichi (松平信通) | 1693 - 1697 | Nakatsukasa-no-shoyu (中務少輔) | Junior 5th Rank, Lower Grade (従五位下) | 30,000 koku |
Itakura clan, 1699-1871 (Fudai)
| 1 | Itakura Shigetaka (板倉重高) | 1699 - 1713 | Etchu-no-kami (越中守) | Junior 5th Rank, Lower Grade (従五位下) | 20,000 koku |
| 2 | Itakura Masanobu (板倉昌信) | 1713 - 1730 | Uemon-no-suke (右衛門佐) | Junior 5th Rank, Lower Grade (従五位下) | 20,000 koku |
| 3 | Itakura Katsuoki (板倉勝興) | 1730 - 1784 | Settsu-no-kami (摂津守) | Junior 5th Rank, Lower Grade (従五位下) | 20,000 koku |
| 4 | Itakura Katsuyuki (板倉勝志) | 1784 - 1785 | Mondo-no-sho (主水正) | Junior 5th Rank, Lower Grade (従五位下) | 20,000 koku |
| 5 | Itakura Katsuyoshi (板倉勝喜) | 1785 - 1803 | Mondo-no-suke (主水佑) | Junior 5th Rank, Lower Grade (従五位下) | 20,000 koku |
| 6 | Itakura Katsumoto (板倉勝氐) | 1803 - 1805 | Oribe-no-kami (織部正) | Junior 5th Rank, Lower Grade (従五位下) | 20,000 koku |
| 7 | Itakura Katsusuke (板倉勝資) | 1806 - 1832 | Etchu-no-kami (越中守) | Junior 5th Rank, Lower Grade (従五位下) | 20,000 koku |
| 8 | Itakura Katsusada (板倉勝貞) | 1832 - 1848 | Settsu-no-kami (津守守) | Junior 5th Rank, Lower Grade (従五位下) | 20,000 koku |
| 9 | Itakura Katsushige (板倉勝成) | 1848 - 1848 | Settsu-no-kami (津守守) | Junior 5th Rank, Lower Grade (従五位下) | 20,000 koku |
| 10 | Itakura Katsumata (板倉勝全) | 1848 - 1858 | Settsu-no-kami (津守守) | Junior 5th Rank, Lower Grade (従五位下) | 20,000 koku |
| 11 | Itakura Katsunori (板倉勝弘) | 1858 - 1871 | -none- | Junior 5th Rank, Lower Grade (従五位下) | 20,000 koku |

== See also ==
- List of Han
- Abolition of the han system
