= Itakura Katsusuke =

- 板倉 勝弼
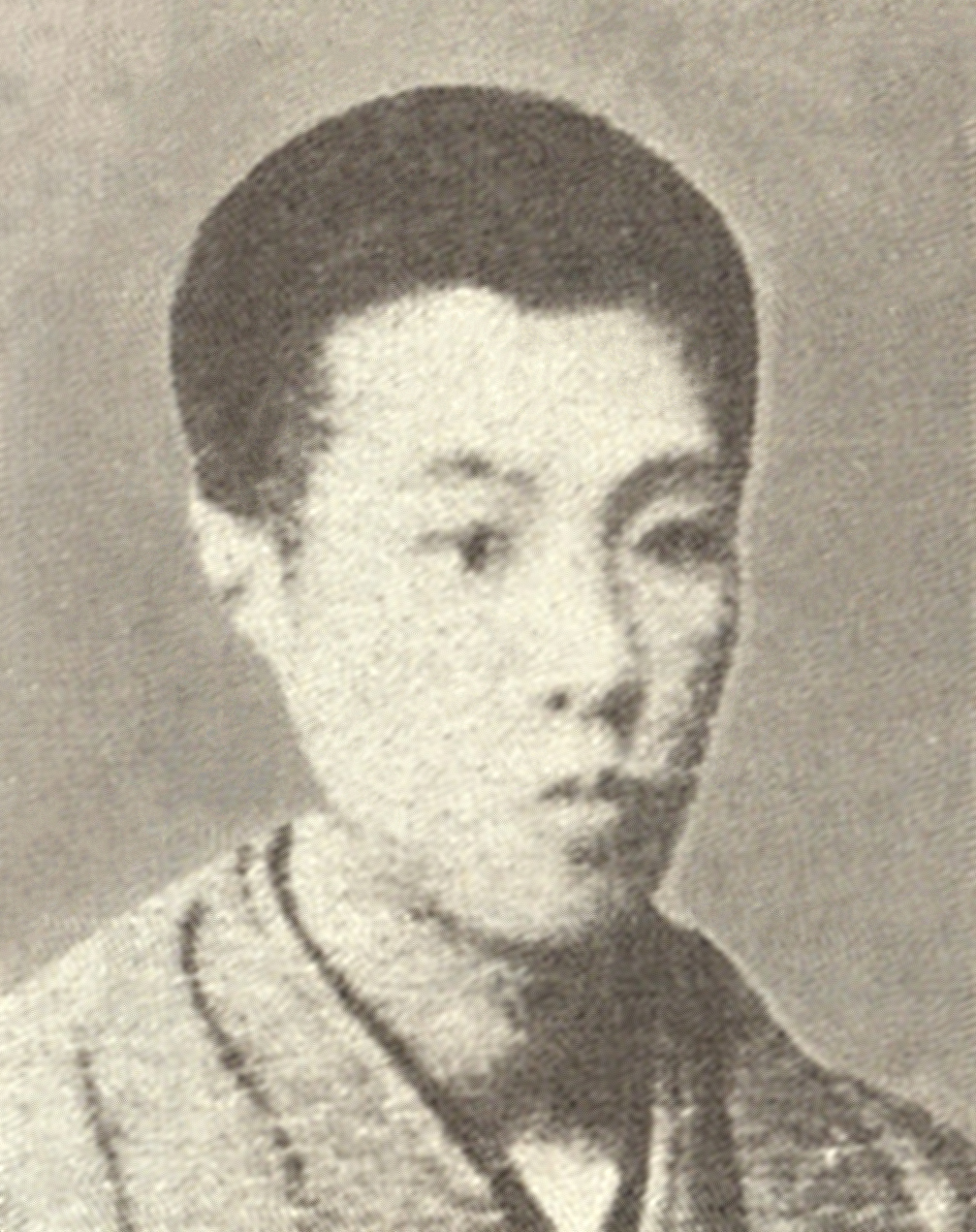
- Itakura Katsusuke
- Born: May 6, 1846
- Died: October 21, 1896 (aged 50)
- Title: Daimyō
- Predecessor: Itakura Katsukiyo

Itakura Katsusuke (板倉 勝弼) (May 6, 1846 - October 21, 1896) was the nephew of Itakura Katsuaki. He was the eighth and last Itakura Daimyō of Bitchū-Matsuyama.

He succeeded Itakura Katsukiyo in 1869.

== Family ==
- Father: Itakura Katsutaka
- Mother: Ishida clan's daughter
- Wife: Ōta Sukekatsu’s daughter
- Concubine: Morishima clan's daughter
- Children:
  - Itakura Katsunori
  - Itakura Katsusada
  - Itakura Katsunobu (1897-1923)
  - Masuko married Makino Tadaatsu

== Title ==
Preceded by Itakura Katsukiyo	Daimyō of Bitchū-Matsuyama Domain; 1869–1871	Succeeded by Domain Abolished
Preceded by Itakura Katsukiyo	Head of Itakura clan 1869–1896	Succeeded by Itakura Katsunori
