= Itakura Katsutake =

Daimyo of the Bitchu-Matsuyama domain

- 板倉 勝武
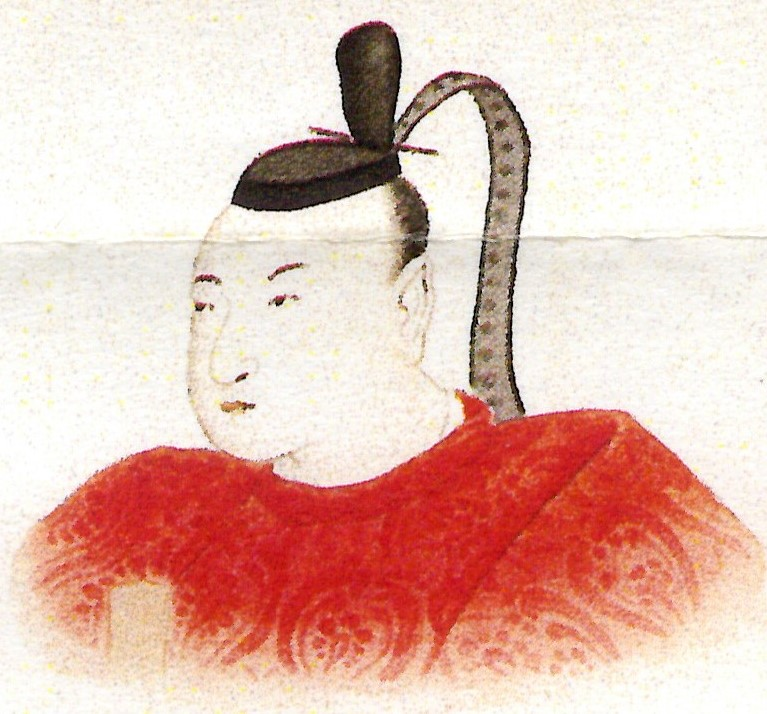
- Born: February 1, 1736
- Died: June 30, 1769 (aged 33)
- Term: 1751–1769
- Predecessor: Itakura Katsuzumi
- Successor: Itakura Katsuyori

Itakura Katsutake (板倉 勝武; February 1, 1736 – June 30, 1769) was the eldest son of Itakura Katsuzumi and the second Itakura daimyo of the Bitchū-Matsuyama Domain. He became the daimyo after his father's death and was succeeded by his brother Itakura Katsuyori. His courtesy title was Mino-no-kami (美濃守).

== Family ==
- Father: Itakura Katsuzumi
- Mother: Nezu clan's daughter
- Wife: Hoshoin, Wakisaka Yasuoki's daughter
- Concubine: Ichiba clan's daughter
- Children:
  - Daughter married Itakura Katsuyuki
  - Daughter married Yamauchi Toyoyasu

== Title ==
Preceded by Itakura Katsuzumi	Lord of Bitchū-Matsuyama Domain: Itakura Katsutake; 1751-1769	Succeeded by Itakura Katsuyori
