= Bitchū-Matsuyama Domain =

Administrative division in western Japan during the Edo period (1617–1871)

Bitchū-Matsuyama Domain 備中松山藩
- Domain of Japan
- 1617–1871
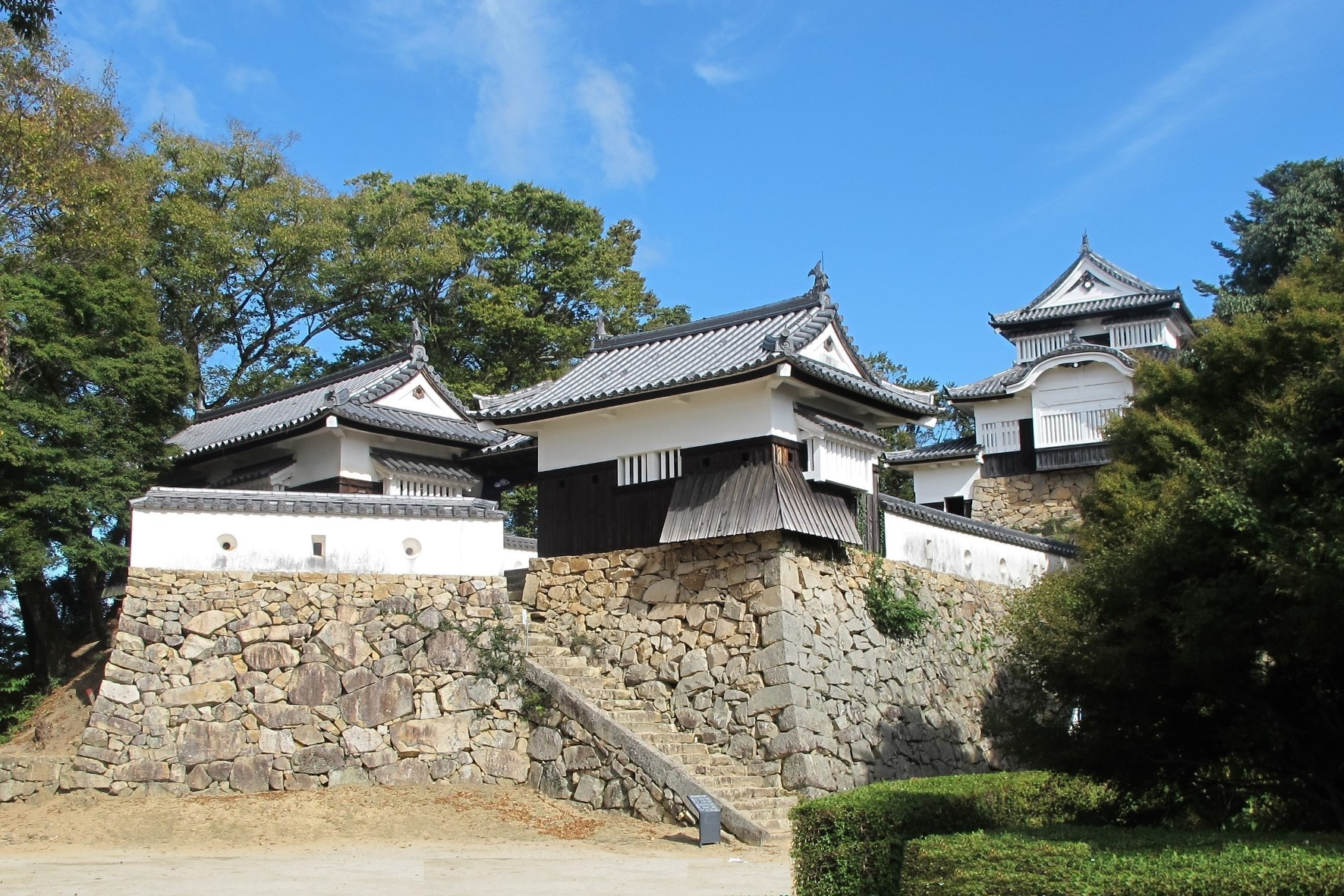
- Bitchū Matsuyama Castle in Takahashi, Okayama

- Mon of the Itakura clan
- Capital: Bitchū Matsuyama Castle
- Area
  - Coordinates: 34°48′32.68″N 133°37′20.29″E
- Historical era: Edo period
  - Established: 1617
  - Abolition of the han system: 1871
- Contained within
  - Province: Bitchū Province
- Today part of: Okayama Prefecture

Location of Bitchū Matsuyama Castle
Bitchū-Matsuyama Domain (Japan)

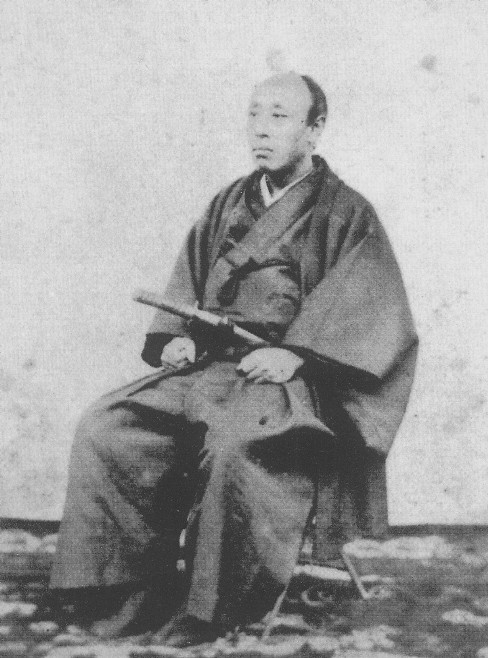
Itakura Katsukiyo

Bitchū-Matsuyama Domain (備中松山藩, Bitchū-Matsuyama-han) was a feudal domain under the Tokugawa shogunate of Edo period Japan, in what is now western Okayama Prefecture. It controlled most of central Bitchū Province and was centered around Bitchū Matsuyama Castle. It was ruled in its latter history by a branch of the Itakura clan. Following the Meiji restoration, it was briefly renamed Takahashi Domain (高梁藩, Takahashi-han). It was dissolved in the abolition of the han system in 1871 and is now part of Okayama Prefecture.

== History ==
After the 1600 Battle of Sekigahara, the area of central Bitchū Province was retained as tenryō territory, administed by the Kobori clan Although Kobori Masatsugu and his son Kobori Masakazu had a nominal kokudaka of 14,460 koku, their official portion was that of daikan, or magistrate, rather than daimyō. Kobori Masakazu is better known as the famed Japanese garden designer, Kobori Enshū.

In 1617, Ikeda Nagayuki was transferred from Tottori Domain and assigned 60,000 koku; however, his son Nagatsune died without heir in 1641. The domain was then assigned to Mizunoya Katsutaka of Nariwa Domain, who completed the construction of Matsuyama Castle and its surrounding castle town. Nariwa Domain was a 50,000 koku holding also in what is now Takahashi that was reduced to a hatamoto holding by this move, but was later briefly restored as a domain by the fledgling Meiji government. Mizunoya Katsukata's grandson, Katsuyoshi died before an heir could be appointed, and the shogunate used this as an excuse to reduce the clan to hatamoto status and the domain fell to attainder. Asano Naganori of Akō Domain (later to become famous for the Forty-seven rōnin incident was appointed to oversee the seizure of the domain, and he appointed his chief retainer Ōishi Kuranosuke as castellan of Matsuyama for the 18 month period until a new daimyō was appointed. Ōishi Kuranosuke had a bad reputation in Matsuyama for his arrogance and inflexible attitude, and under his control a comprehensive survey was conducted by the shogunate.

In 1695, the domain was reassessed at 65,000 koku, and assigned to Andō Shigehiro from Takasaki Domain. The Andō clan was transferred to Kano Domain in Mino Province in 1711, and the domain assigned to Ishikawa Fusayoshi from Yodo Domain. He traded places with Itakura Katsuzumi of Ise-Kameyama Domain in Ise Province in 1744. The Itakura clan would rule Bitchū-Matsuyama until the end of the Edo Period. The 7th daimyō, Itakura Katsukiyo was a noted figure in the Bakumatsu period shogunate, serving as head of the rōjū following the assassination of Ii Naosuke and playing an important role on the side of the pro-Tokugawa forces in the Boshin War. For this reason, Bitchū-Matsuyama invaded and occupied by the pro-imperial forces of Okayama Domain early in the war. In 1869, Itakura Katsukiyo surrendered, and his kokudaka was reduced to 20,000 koku and he was ordered into forced retirement. The Meiji government also ordered his successor, Itakura Katsusuke, to change the name of the domain to "Takahashi Domain" to avoid confusion with Iyo-Matsuyama Domain.

In 1871, Takahashi Domain became Takahashi Prefecture due to the abolition of the han system and was subsequently incorporated into Okayama Prefecture through Fukatsu Prefecture and Oda Prefecture.

== Holdings at the end of the Edo period ==
As with most domains in the han system, Bitchū-Matsuyama Domain consisted of several discontinuous territories calculated to provide the assigned kokudaka, based on periodic cadastral surveys and projected agricultural yields, g.

- Bitchū Province
  - 5 villages in Aga District
  - 2 villages in Asakuchi District
  - 11 villages in Kaya District
  - 4 villages in Katō District
  - 15 villages in Jōbū District
  - 17 villages in Tetsuta District
  - 12 villages in Kawakami District

== List of daimyō ==
#	Name	Tenure	Courtesy title	Court Rank	kokudaka
Ikeda clan, 1617–1641 (Tozama)
1	Ikeda Nagayoshi (池田長幸)	1617–1632	Bitchū-no-kami (備中守)	Junior 5th Rank, Lower Grade (従五位下)	65,000 koku
2	Ikeda Nagatsune (池田長常)	1632–1641	Izumo-no-kami (出雲守)	Junior 5th Rank, Lower Grade (従五位下)	65,000 koku
Mizunoya clan, 1642–1693 (Tozama -> Fudai
1	Mizunoya Katsutaka (水谷勝隆)	1642–1664	Ise-no-kami (伊勢守)	Junior 5th Rank, Lower Grade (従五位下)	50,000 koku
2	Mizunoya Katsumune (水谷勝宗)	1664–1689	Sakyō-no-suke (左京亮)	Junior 5th Rank, Lower Grade (従五位下)	50,000 koku
3	Mizunoya Katsuyoshi (水谷勝美)	1689–1693	Dewa-no-kami (出羽守)	Junior 5th Rank, Lower Grade (従五位下)	50,000 koku
Andō clan, 1695–1711 (Fudai)
1	Andō Shigehiro (安藤重博)	1695–1698	Tsushima-no-kami (対馬守)	Junior 5th Rank, Lower Grade (従五位下)	65,000 koku
2	Andō Nobutomo (安藤信友)	1698–1711	Ukyō-no-suke (右京亮)	Junior 5th Rank, Lower Grade (従五位下)	65,000 koku
Ishikawa clan, 1711–1744 (Fudai)
1	Ishikawa Fusayoshi (石川総慶)	1711–1744	Tonomo-no-kami (主殿頭)	Junior 5th Rank, Lower Grade (従五位下)	60,000 koku
Itakura clan, 1744–1871 (Fudai)
1	Itakura Katsuzumi (板倉勝澄)	1744–1751	Sagami-no-kami (相模守)	Junior 5th Rank, Lower Grade (従五位下)	50,000 koku
2	Itakura Katsutake (板倉勝武)	1751–1769	Mino-no-kami (美濃守)	Junior 5th Rank, Lower Grade (従五位下)	50,000 koku
3	Itakura Katsuyori (板倉勝従)	1769–1778	Oki-no-kami (隠岐守)	Junior 5th Rank, Lower Grade (従五位下)	50,000 koku
4	Itakura Katsumasa (板倉勝政)	1779–1801	Suo-no-kami (周防守)	Junior 5th Rank, Lower Grade (従五位下)	50,000 koku
5	Itakura Katsuaki (板倉勝晙)	1801–1804	Suo-no-kami (周防守)	Junior 5th Rank, Lower Grade (従五位下)	50,000 koku
6	Itakura Katsutsune (板倉勝職)	1804–1849	Suo-no-kami (周防守)	Junior 5th Rank, Lower Grade (従五位下)	50,000 koku
7	Itakura Katsukiyo (板倉勝静)	1849–1869	Iga-no-kami (伊賀守)	Junior 4th Rank, Lower Grade (従四位下)	50,000 koku
8	Itakura Katsusuke (板倉勝弼)	1869–1871	-none-	Junior 5th Rank (従五位)	20,000 koku

== See also ==
- List of Han
- Abolition of the han system
