= Itakura Katsutsune =

Eldest son of itakura katsuaki

- 板倉 勝職
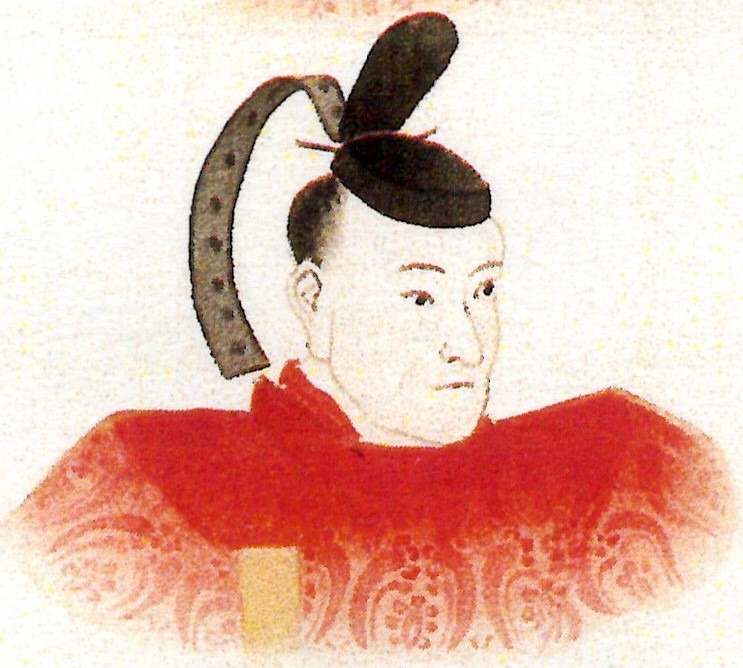
- Itakura Katsutsune
- Born: August 17, 1803
- Died: October 9, 1849 (aged 46)
- Title: daimyō
- Term: 1804-1849
- Predecessor: Itakura Katsuaki
- Successor: Itakura Katsukiyo

Itakura Katsutsune (板倉 勝職; August 17, 1803 – October 9, 1849) was the eldest son of Itakura Katsuaki. He was the sixth Itakura daimyō of Bitchū-Matsuyama Domain. His childhood name was Mizunoshin (衛之進).

He succeeded his father, Itakura Katsuaki, as daimyō in 1804, and was succeeded by his adoptive son and son-in-law Itakura Katsukiyo in 1849.

== Family ==
- Father: Itakura Katsuaki
- Mother: Omura Sumiyasu’s daughter
- Wives:
  - Toda Ujitsune‘s daughter
  - Tsugaru Yasuchika’s daughter
  - Kuroda Naokata’s daughter
- Daughter: married Itakura Katsukiyo
- Adoptive Son: Itakura Katsukiyo

== Title ==
Preceded by Itakura Katsuaki	Daimyō of Bitchū-Matsuyama Domain; 1804–1849	Succeeded by Itakura Katsukiyo
