= Itakura Katsuyori =

- 板倉 勝従
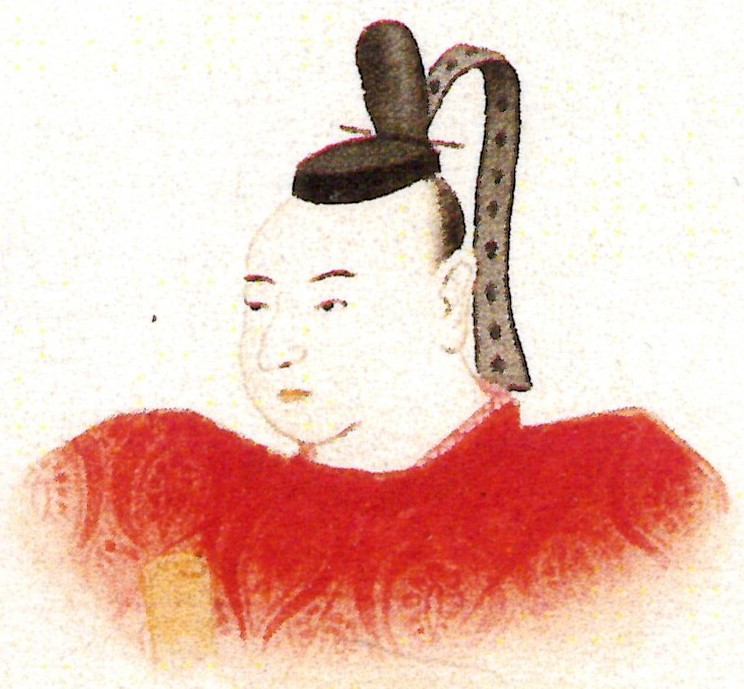
- Born: April 29, 1750
- Died: March 7, 1778 (aged 27)
- Title: Daimyō
- Term: 1769–1778
- Predecessor: Itakura Katsutake
- Successor: Itakura Katsumasa

Itakura Katsuyori (板倉 勝従; April 29, 1750 – March 7, 1778) was the second son of Itakura Katsuzumi. He became the third Itakura daimyō of Bitchū-Matsuyama Domain after the death of his older brother Itakura Katsutake in 1769. His courtesy title was Oki-no-kami (隠岐守).

He was succeeded by his younger brother, Itakura Katsumasa, after his death in 1778.

== Family ==
- Father: Itakura Katsuzumi
- Mother: Nezu clan's daughter
- Wife: Okadaira Masasumi's daughter

== Title ==
Preceded by Itakura Katsutake	Lord of Bitchū-Matsuyama Domain: Itakura Katsuyori; 1769-1778	Succeeded by Itakura Katsumasa
