= Itakura Katsuaki (Bitchu-Matsuyama) =

Japanese daimyō

- 板倉 勝晙
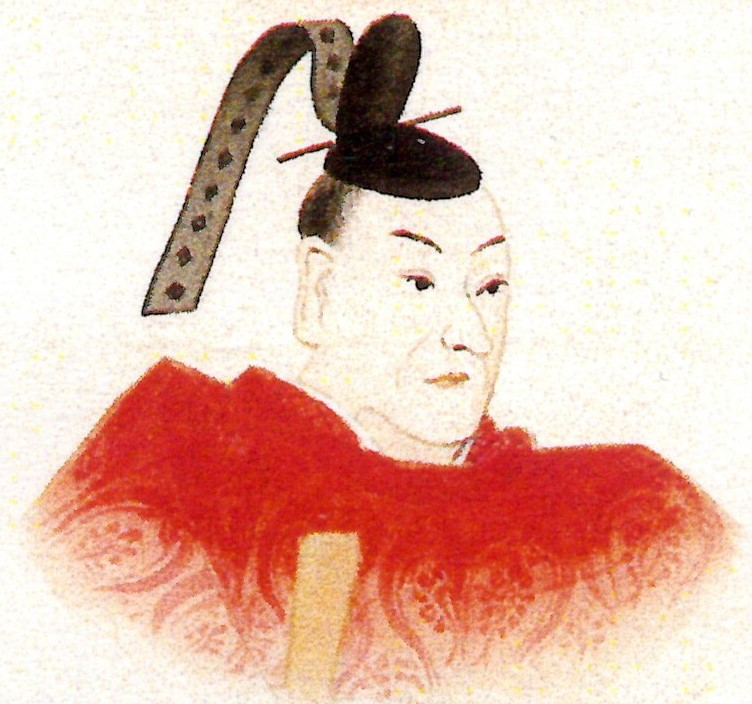
- Born: August 10, 1784
- Died: July 8, 1804 (aged 19)
- Term: 1801–1804
- Predecessor: Itakura Katsumasa
- Successor: Itakura Katsutsune

Itakura Katsuaki (板倉 勝晙) (August 10,1784 – July 8, 1804) was the fifth Itakura daimyō of Bitchū-Matsuyama Domain. Katsuaki was the fourth son of Itakura Katsumasa. His mother was the daughter of Toda Ujihide, daimyō of Ōgaki Domain. His childhood name was Shinjuro (新十郎).

He succeeded the title in 1801, after his father's death. He was succeeded by his eldest son, Itakura Katsutsune, after his death in 1804.

== Family ==
- Father: Itakura Katsumasa
- Mother: daughter of Toda Ujihide
- Wife: Omura Sumiyasu's daughter
- Son: Itakura Katsutsune

== Title ==
Preceded by Itakura Katsumasa	Daimyō of Bitchū-Matsuyama Domain; 1801–1804	Succeeded by Itakura Katsutsune
