= Itakura Katsuzumi =

Japanese daimyō

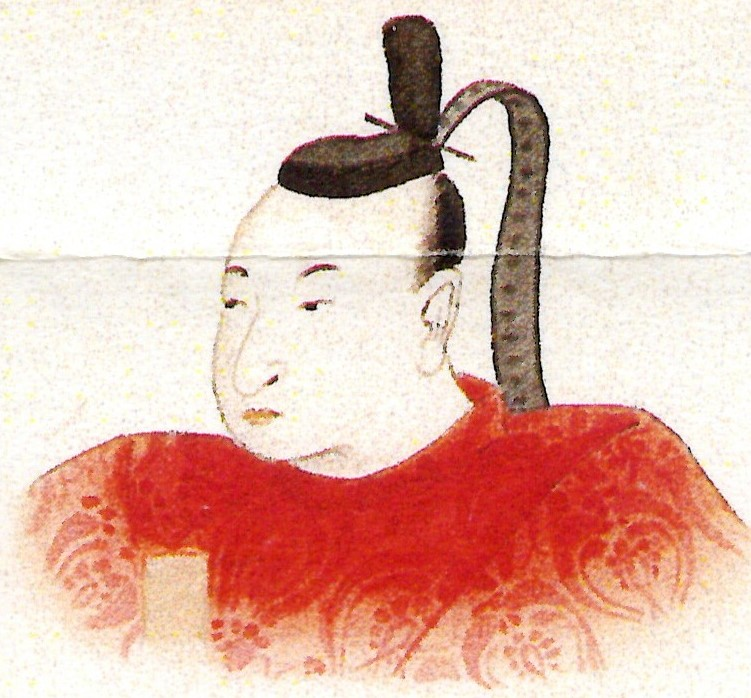
- Born: August 13, 1719
- Died: June 6, 1769
- Other names: Shinpei (新平) Sagami-no-kami (相模守)
- Title: Daimyō
- Term: 1744–1751
- Successor: Itakura Katsutake

Itakura Katsuzumi (Japanese: 板倉 勝澄) (August 13, 1719 – June 6, 1769) was the first Itakura daimyō of the Bitchū-Matsuyama Domain. He was eventually succeeded by Itakura Katsutake. His childhood name was Shinpei (新平). His courtesy title was Sagami-no-kami (相模守).

== Family ==
- Father: Itakura Shigeharu (1697-1724)
- Mother: Murai Clan's daughter
- Wife: Toda Tadami's daughter
- Concubines:
  - Nezu clan's daughter
  - Uehara clan's daughter
  - Fukumura clan's daughter
- Children:
  - Itakura Katsutake by Nezu clan's daughter
  - Toda Mitsukuni
  - Itakura Katsuyori by Nezu clan's daughter
  - Itakura Katsumasa by Uehara clan's daughter
  - Itakura Katsuyuki (1752-1773)
  - Itakura Katsumine
  - Ina Tadataka (1764-1794)
  - Itakura Katsufusa
  - daughter married Maeda Toshihisa
  - daughter married Hori Naoyasu
  - daughter married Kose Toshitaka
  - daughter married Suganuma Sadatoshi
  - daughter married Honda Tadamitsu

== Title ==
Preceded by Ishikawa Fusayoshi	Lord of Bitchū-Matsuyama Domain: Itakura Katsuzumi; 1724-1751	Succeeded by Itakura Katsutake
