= Itakura Katsumasa =

- 板倉 勝政
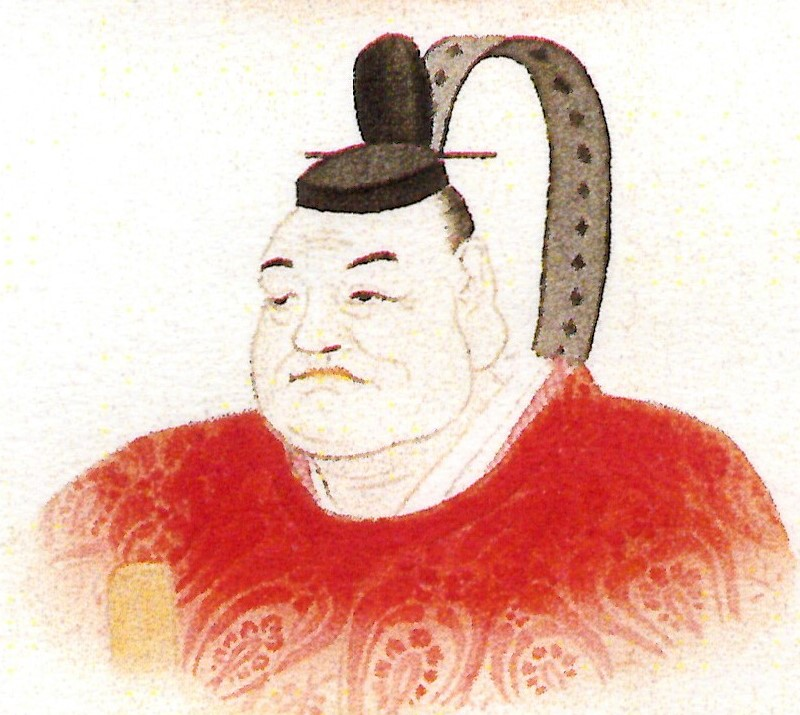
- Itakura Katsumasa
- Born: April 17, 1759.
- Died: April 4, 1821.
- Title: Daimyō
- Term: 1778–1801
- Predecessor: Itakura Katsuyori
- Successor: Itakura Katsuaki
- Father: Itakura Katsuzumi

Itakura Katsumasa (板倉 勝政; April 17, 1759 – April 4, 1821). Seventh son of Itakura Katsuzumi. Fourth Itakura daimyō of Bitchū-Matsuyama Domain.

He became daimyō in 1778, after the death of his older brother Itakura Katsuyori. He was succeeded by his son, Itakura Katsuaki, in 1801.

== Family ==
- Father: Itakura Katsuzumi
- Mother: Uehara clan's daughter
- Wife: Toda Ujihide's daughter
- Concubines:
  - Shindo Clan's daughter
  - Tanimura Clan's daughter
  - Honta clan's daughter
- Children:
  - Itakura Katsuaki by Toda Ujihide's daughter
  - Itakura Katsunao (1785-1820) by Honta clan's daughter
  - Itakura Katsutaka
  - daughter married Iwaki Takanobu
  - daughter married Yanagisawa Satoyo

== Title ==
| Preceded by Itakura Katsuyori | Lord of Bitchū-Matsuyama Domain: Itakura Katsumasa; 1778-1804 | Succeeded by Itakura Katsuaki |
