= Itakura Katsukiyo =

Japanese daimyō (1823–1889)

- 板倉 勝静
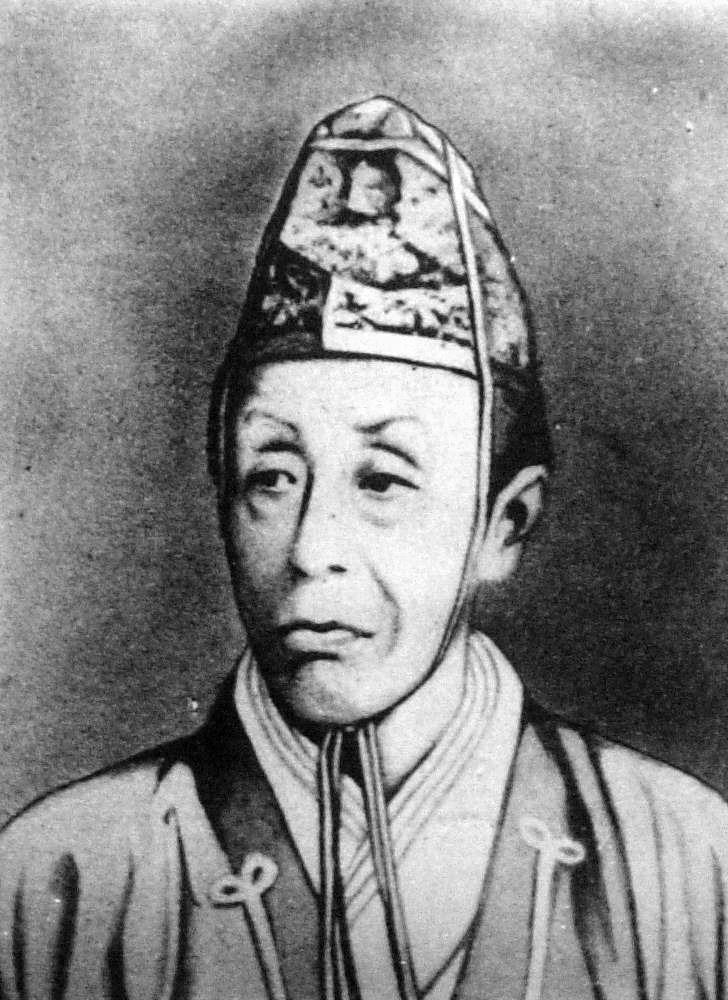
- Itakura Katsukiyo

Daimyō of Bitchū-Matsuyama
- In office 1849–1869
- Preceded by: Itakura Katsutsune
- Succeeded by: Itakura Katsusuke

Personal details
- Born: February 14, 1823 Edo, Japan
- Died: April 6, 1889 (aged 66) Tokyo, Japan

Itakura Katsukiyo (板倉 勝静; February 14, 1823 – April 6, 1889) was a Japanese daimyō of the late Edo period. Famed for his tenure as rōjū, Itakura later became a Shinto priest.

== Biography ==
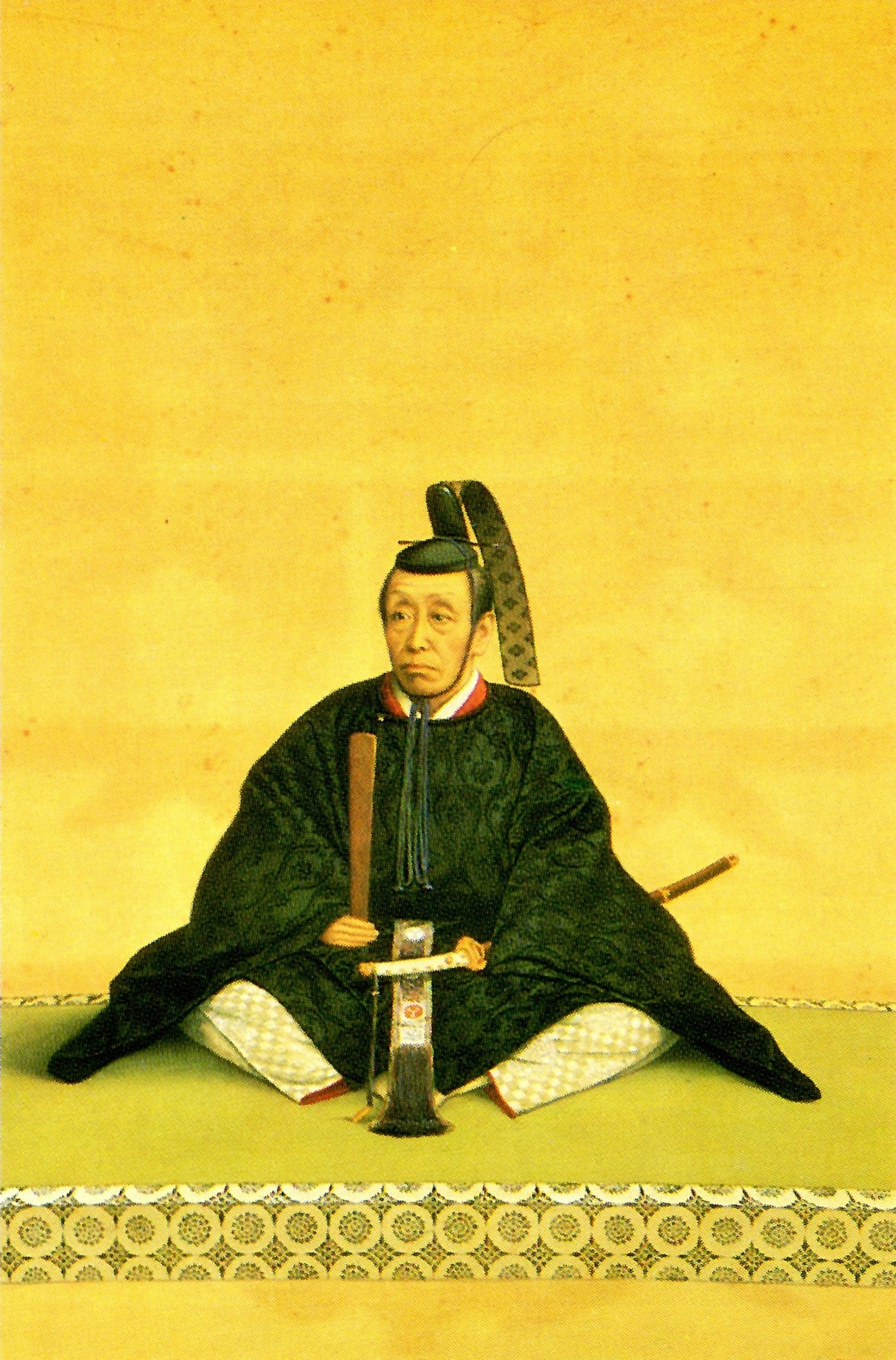

Itakura, born to the Hisamatsu-Matsudaira of the Kuwana Domain, was adopted by Itakura Katsutsune, the lord of the Matsuyama domain. As a student of Yamada Hōkoku, Itakura worked to reform his domain's administration and finances. His childhood name was Matsudaira Yatsuhachiro (松平寧八郎) later Mannoshin (万之進).

Itakura entered the ranks of the shogunate bureaucracy. He served as jisha-bugyō in 1857–1859 and again in 1861–1862. He became a rōjū in 1862.

Itakura fought in the Boshin War, and served as a staff officer of the Ōuetsu Reppan Dōmei. He joined the Ezo Republic, and fought at Hakodate. After a short time in prison, he was released in the early 1870s, and later became priest of the Tōshōgu Shrine in Ueno.

== Family ==
- Father: Matsudaira Sadanaga (1791-1838)
- Mother: Zuishin-in
- Wife: Itakura Katsutsune‘s daughter
- Concubine: Otsuru no kata
- Son: Itakura Katsutake

== Notes ==
Preceded by Itakura Katsutsune	Daimyō of Bitchū-Matsuyama; 1849–1869	Succeeded by Itakura Katsusuke
