= List of national treasures of Japan (ancient documents) =

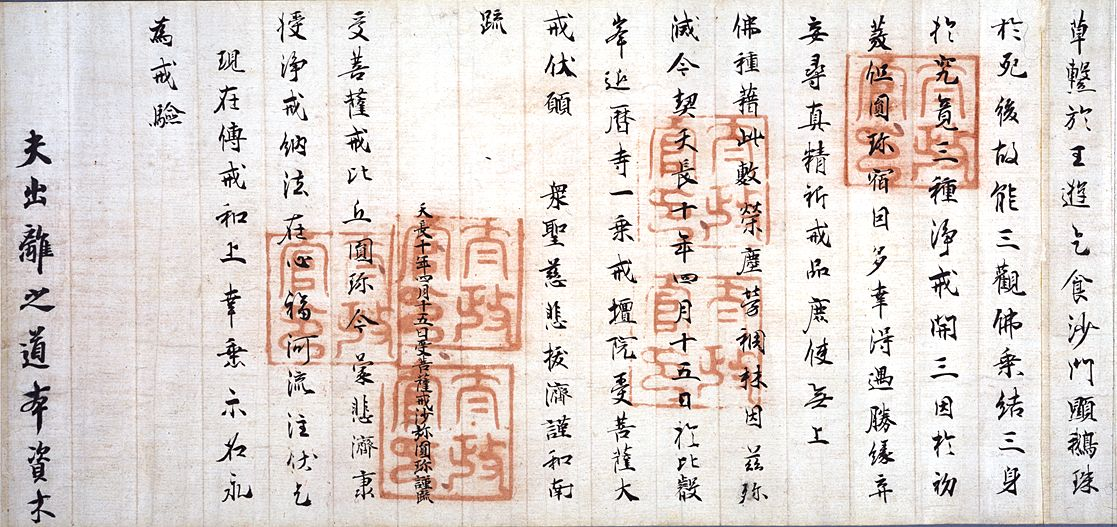
Part of the ordination certificate of Enchin from 833

The term "national treasure" has been used in Japan to denote cultural properties since 1897. The definition and the criteria have changed since the introduction of the term. These ancient documents adhere to the current definition, and have been designated national treasures since the Law for the Protection of Cultural Properties came into effect on June 9, 1951. The items are selected by the Agency for Cultural Affairs, a special body of the Ministry of Education, Culture, Sports, Science, and Technology, based on their "especially high historical or artistic value". "Ancient documents" is one of thirteen categories of national treasures recognized by the agency. The list presents 63 documents or sets of documents from classical to early modern Japan, from the Asuka period to the Meiji period. The actual number of items is more than 63 because groups of related objects have been combined into single entries. The list contains items of various types, such as letters, diaries, records or catalogues, certificates, imperial decrees, testaments and maps. The documents record early Japanese government and Buddhism including early Japanese contact with China, the organization of the state and life at the Japanese imperial court. They are housed in 14 Japanese cities in temples (35), museums (13), libraries or archives (6), shrines (4), universities (2) and in private collections (2). Most entries (28) in the list are located in Kyoto. The documents in this list were made predominantly with a writing brush on paper and, in many cases, present important examples of calligraphy.

Writing was physically introduced to Japan from China in the form of inscribed artifacts at the beginning of the Christian era. Examples, some of which have been designated as archaeological national treasures, include coins of the reign of Wang Mang (AD 8–25), a 1st-century gold seal from Shikanoshima, a late 2nd century iron sword from the Tōdaijiyama burial mound, the Seven-Branched Sword with inscription from 369 and a large number of bronze mirrors—the oldest dating to the 3rd century. All of these artifacts originated on the continent, most likely in China. However, the written inscriptions on them may not have been recognized as writing but instead may have been mistaken for decorations by the Japanese. When the Japanese later manufactured locally copies of original Chinese mirrors, they may have continued to believe the written inscriptions to be merely decorative.

The concept of writing came to Japan from the Korean kingdom of Baekje in the form of classical Chinese books likely written on paper and in the form of manuscript rolls (kansubon). This probably happened at the beginning of the 5th century (around 400), and certainly during the 6th century. According to legend, the scholar Wani introduced the Chinese writing system as well as Confucianism to Japan. The oldest texts of Japanese origin, which show a clear understanding of the concept of writing, date to the 5th century and are—like most texts from before 700—inscriptions on stone or metal. Examples include three archaeological national treasures: Suda Hachiman Shrine Mirror from about the 5th century, which is a poor copy of a Chinese original, the Inariyama Sword from 471 or 531 and the Eta Funayama burial mound sword from about the 5th century. The abrupt transition from an unfamiliarity with writing to reading and writing complicated works in a foreign language required the earliest Japanese texts be composed and read by people from the continent such as Wani. The Inariyama Sword is also the oldest example of man'yōgana use, a writing system that employs Chinese characters to represent the Japanese language. Soon after the introduction of writing, scribes were appointed to the provinces to "record events and report conditions".

While writing in Japan was limited during the 5th and 6th centuries, the number of documents written locally increased in the 7th century; though most of them have been lost. By the end of the 7th century, increased cultural dependence on China caused reading and writing, particularly in government and religion, to become an integral part of Japanese life. There were two major factors for this development: starting with the Taika Reforms (645–649) and continuing with the Asuka Kiyomihara Code (689) and censuses from 670 and 690, a Chinese-style centralized state was formed, requiring the need for a large number of officials who were literate and educated in, among others, Confucian texts at the Daigakuryo ("University") founded under Emperor Tenchi. The second factor was the increasing popularity of Buddhism, which had been introduced to Japan in the mid-6th century and strongly promoted by Prince Shōtoku (574–622). The Sangyō Gisho ("Annotated Commentaries on the Three Sutras"), traditionally attributed to Prince Shōtoku, is the oldest extant Japanese text of any length. Buddhism required the study of sutras written in Chinese, and the state founded a Sutra Copying Bureau (shakyōjo) before 727. (Note: Probably much before this date.) The oldest Japanese books are two chronicles, Kojiki and Nihon Shoki, from the early 8th century. While the phonogram orthography enjoyed increasing popularity during the 8th century, it was not yet used for longer prose. The modern kana, notably hiragana and katakana were developed in the Heian period.

== Statistics ==
Almost half of all entries in the list are located in Kyoto.

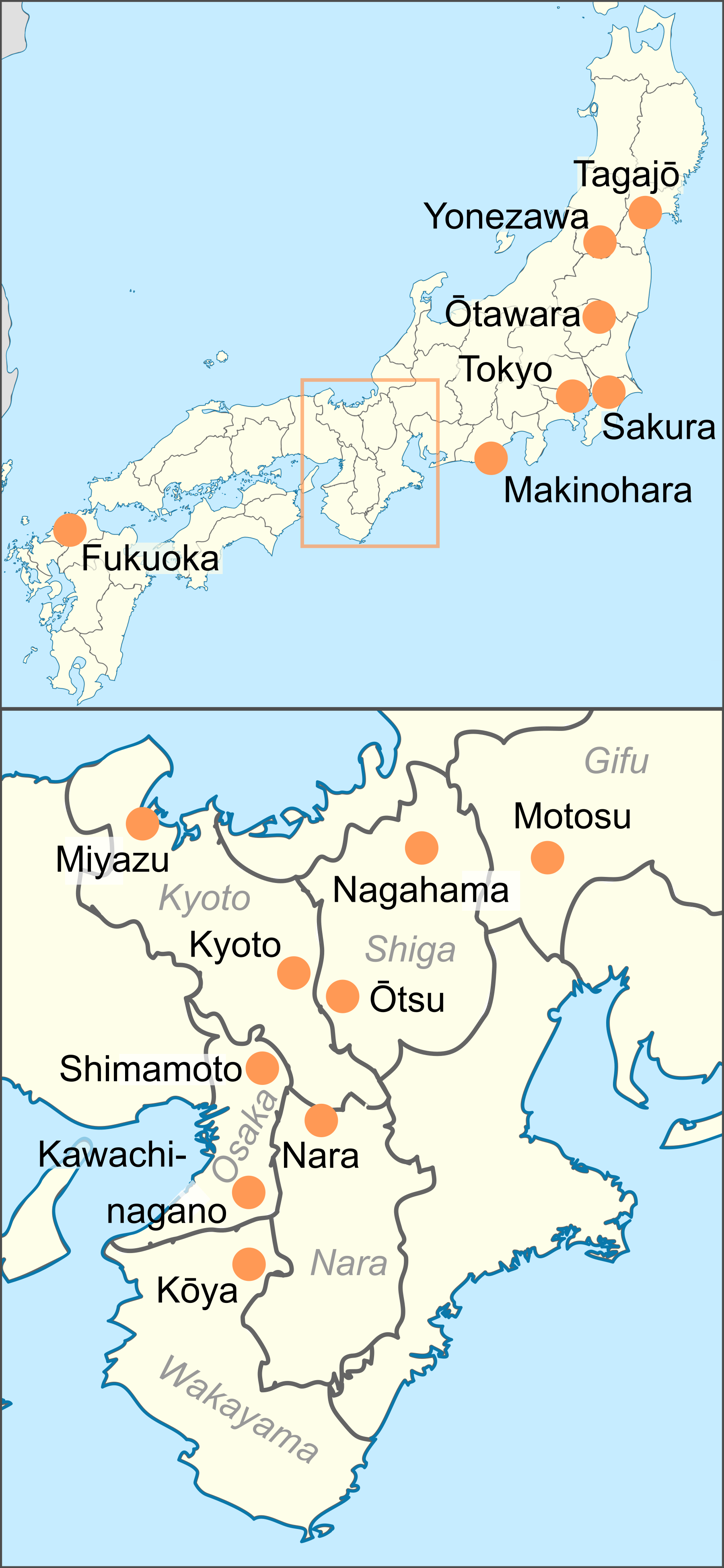
Map showing the location of ancient document national treasures in Japan

Prefecture	City	National treasures
Chiba	Sakura	2
Fukuoka	Fukuoka	1
Gifu	Motosu	1
Kyoto	Kyoto	28
Kyoto	Miyazu	1
Miyagi	Tagajō	1
Nara	Nara	4
Osaka	Kawachinagano	1
Osaka	Shimamoto	1
Shiga	Nagahama	1
Shiga	Ōtsu	8
Shizuoka	Makinohara	1
Tochigi	Ōtawara	1
Tokyo	Tokyo	10
Wakayama	Kōya	1
Yamagata	Yonezawa	1

Period (Note: Only the oldest period is counted, if a national treasure consists of items from more than one period.)	National treasures
Asuka period	1
Nara period	9
Heian period	32
Tang dynasty	1
Kamakura period	17
Yuan dynasty	1
Nanboku-chō period	1
Momoyama period	1

== Usage ==
The table's columns (except for Content and Images) are sortable pressing the arrows symbols. The following gives an overview of what is included in the table and how the sorting works.

- Name: the name as registered in the Database of National Cultural Properties
- Author: name of the author(s)
- Content: information about the type of document and its content
- Date: period and year; The column entries sort by year. If only a period is known, they sort by the start year of that period.
- Format: principal type, technique and dimensions; The column entries sort by the main type: scroll (includes handscrolls and letters), collection (sets of items) and other (includes textiles, hanging scrolls, stone inscriptions and folding books 帖)
- Present location: "building-name temple/museum/shrine-name town-name prefecture-name"; The column entries sort as "prefecture-name town-name".
- Image: picture of the document or of a characteristic document in a group of documents

== Treasures ==
Name	Authors	Content	Date	Format	Present location	Image
Documents of the Shimazu Family (島津家文書, Shimazu-ke Monjo) (Note: 33 document boxes are attached to the nomination.)	—	Large scale collection of documents of the Shimazu clan covering among others politics, diplomacy, social economy and inheritance	Heian period to Meiji period	bundle/batch. The total number of documents is 15,133 (848 rolled scrolls, 752 bound books, 2629 bound double-leaved (袋とじ, fukuro-toji) books, 2 hanging scrolls, 4908 single sheet letters, 160 maps of glued sheets, 207 single sheet maps)	Historiographical Institute of the University of Tokyo, Tokyo	Text in Chinese script which is partially faded.
Genealogy of the Amabe Clan (海部氏系図, amabeshi keizu) (Note: A survey document (海部氏勘注系図) of one rolled scroll is attached to the nomination.)	—	Oldest extant Japanese family tree	Heian period	one rolled scroll, 25.7 cm × 228.5 cm (10.1 in × 90.0 in)	private, Kono Shrine, Miyazu, Kyoto	Very few vertical lines in Chinese characters on yellow aged paper.
Letter from the viceroy of Portuguese India (ポルトガル国印度副王信書, porutogaru kokuindo fukuō shinsho)	Duarte de Menezes	Letter from Duarte de Menezes, viceroy of Portuguese India to daimyō Toyotomi Hideyoshi concerning the suppression of Christians in Japan	Azuchi–Momoyama period, April 1588	one single sheet letter, ink on paper, 60.8 cm × 76.4 cm (23.9 in × 30.1 in)	Myōhō-in (妙法院), Kyoto	Handwritten document with a wide ornamental border on the left/right and top side. A seal is attached to the bottom of the document via a cord.
etchū kuni kansō nōkoku kōtaiki zankan (越中国官倉納穀交替記残巻)	—	Agricultural records of villages in the Tonami District (礪波郡) of Etchū Province. It is a valuable resource for the study of an area under the Ritsuryō law in the 8th to 10th century.	Nara period and Heian period, 751–901	one rolled scroll	Ishiyama-dera, Ōtsu, Shiga	—
Sugaura documents (菅浦文書, sugaura monjo) and Illustrated map of Sugaura and Ōura Shimo manors (菅浦与大浦下庄堺絵図, sugaura to ōura shimo no shō sakai ezu)	—	Documents of the history of Sugaura that are relevant for the study of the history of sō (惣), autonomous peasant communities in medieval Japan. The shōen map contains the boundaries of Sugaura and Ōura-shimo manors whose boundaries were contested at the time, but more prominently Chikubu Island in Lake Biwa with a temple-shrine complex (Jingū-ji).	Kamakura period 1302 (map); Kamakura period – Edo period (documents)	65 bound double-leaved (袋とじ, fukuro-toji) books, 1 hanging scroll	Suga Shrine, Nishiazai, Nagahama, Shiga	Japanese calligraphic writing. Illustrated three-dimensional map showing an island and part of a shore line.
Documents related to the priest Enchin (円珍関係文書, enchin kankei monjo)	Enchin and others	Documents (Note: The eight rolled scrolls are: 1. Letter written by Enchin (円珍自筆書状, enchin jihitsu shojō), 31.2–56.1 cm (12.3–22.1 in); 2. Enchin's ordination Document (円珍戒牒, enchin kaichō), 29.3–192.0 cm (11.5–75.6 in); 3. Document Issued by the Ministry of Civil Administration Notifying the Appointment of Enchin as Attendant Monk (円珍充内供奉治部省牒, enchin jūnai gubu jibu shōchō), 29.4–139.1 cm (11.6–54.8 in); 4. Certificate Issued by Government Headquarters in Dazaifu for Enchin (円珍大宰府公験, enchin dazaifu kugen), 31.2–56.1 cm (12.3–22.1 in), 27.8–39.3 cm (10.9–15.5 in); 5. Certificates Issued by Fuzhou for Enchin (円珍福州公験, enchin fukushū kugen), 31.2–56.1 cm (12.3–22.1 in), 30.5–134.0 cm (12.0–52.8 in); 6. Official Documents Issued by Taizhou and Wenzhou (円珍台州温州公験, enchin taishū unshū kugen), 30.0–338 cm (11.8–133.1 in); 7. Official Request from Sanuki Province (讃岐国司解, sanuki no kokushinoge), 30.3–266 cm (11.9–104.7 in); 8. Request from the Ōtomo Clan (大友氏屈請, ōtomoshi kusshō), 29.6–48.4 cm (11.7–19.1 in)) surrounding Enchin's trip to China (953–958) containing information on his activities as well as on Sino-Japanese relations in the mid-9th century. They are also of interest for the study of calligraphy.	Heian period and Tang dynasty, 9th–10th century	eight rolled scrolls, ink on paper	Tokyo National Museum, Tokyo	Text in rough Chinese script which is partially faded.
Imperial Decree Granting Ecclesiastical Rank of Hōin Daikashō and Posthumous Name Chishō Daishi to Enchin (円珍贈法印大和尚位並智証大師諡号勅書, enchin zō hōin daikashō inarabini chishō daishi shigō chokusho)	Ono no Michikaze (transcription), Fujiwara Hirofumi (composer)	Letter promoting Enchin, the teacher of Zōmyō, abbot of Enryaku-ji, 36 years after his death to the highest ecclesiastical rank: Great Master of the Dharma Seal (Hōin Daikashō) and granting the posthumous name: hishō Daishi	Heian period, December 27, 927	rolled scroll, ink on decorative paper, 28.7 cm × 156.9 cm (11.3 in × 61.8 in)	Tokyo National Museum, Tokyo	Text in bold Chinese script with red stamp marks under part of the text.
Map of Nukata-dera garan and its vicinity (額田寺伽藍並条里図, Nukata-dera garan narabini jōri-zu)	—	A map showing a Shōen or manor in the Nara period. The depicted area is about 1,100m (NS) by 700m (EW).	Nara period, second half of 8th century	four linen cloths which together form a 2x2 map of 113.7 cm × 72.5 cm (44.8 in × 28.5 in)	National Museum of Japanese History, Sakura, Chiba	Cloth divided into squares with labels. Part of the cloth is missing leaving holes in the fabric.
Name list of Abhiseka initiates (灌頂歴名, kanjō rekimyō) or List of individuals admitted into the mysteries of Shingon Buddhism (Note: A one rolled scroll imperial letter by Emperor Go-Uda on the endowment of temple properties is attached to the nomination.)	Kūkai	List of people and deities who underwent the Abhiseka ritual at Takaosan-ji (高雄山寺) (now Jingo-ji) in 812, presided by Kūkai	Heian period, 812	rolled scroll, ink on paper, 29.0 cm × 268.4 cm (11.4 in × 105.7 in)	Jingo-ji, Kyoto	Text in Chinese characters written in very rough style like notes.
Official Register and Inventory for Kanshin-ji (観心寺縁起資財帳, Kanshin-ji engi shizaichō)	—	Document containing the reason and circumstances of the establishment of Kanshin-ji temple and a list of the temple's assets from that time	Heian period, September 15, 883	one rolled scroll	Kanshin-ji, Kawachinagano, Osaka	Carefully written text in Chinese script on dark brown paper with red stamp marks and lines.
Inventory of Kanzeon-ji (観世音寺資財帳, kanzeonji shizaichō)	—	Inventory of Kanzeon-ji	Heian period, October 1, 905	three rolled scrolls, ink on paper: 29.0 cm × 581.5 cm (11.4 in × 228.9 in), 29.0 cm × 936.0 cm (11.4 in × 368.5 in), 29.0 cm × 682.5 cm (11.4 in × 268.7 in)	Tokyo University of the Arts, Tokyo	Text in Chinese characters on lined paper with red stamp marks.
Draft of the petition of foundation of Zenrin-ji by Emperor Kameyama (亀山天皇宸翰禅林寺御起願文案, Kameyama-tennō shinkan zenrinji gokigan mon'an) (Note: One bound registration book (南禅寺領諸国所々紛失御判物帖) is attached to the nomination.)	Emperor Kameyama	Document on the foundation of Nanzen-ji, formerly Zenrin-ji (禅林寺)	Kamakura period, March 5, 1299	one rolled scroll	Nanzen-ji, Kyoto	—
Visit of the cloistered Emperor to Kumano (熊野御幸記, kumano gokōki)	Fujiwara no Teika	Diary in classical Chinese of a visit with Emperor Go-Toba and Minamoto no Michichika to Kumano (熊野)	Kamakura period, October, 1201	one rolled scroll, ink on paper, 30.1 cm × 678.0 cm (11.9 in × 266.9 in)	Mitsui Memorial Museum, Tokyo	Text in Chinese script in rough handwriting like notes.
Diary of ex-Emperor Go-Uda (後宇多院宸記, Go-Uda-in shinki)	Emperor Go-Uda	Chronicle in the guchūreki (具注暦) almanac in the emperor's own handwriting	Kamakura period, 1319	one rolled scroll	National Museum of Japanese History, Sakura, Chiba	Text in Chinese script on lined paper. Part of the text or annotations are in red ink, while most is black.
Will with Handprints by Emperor Go-Uda (後宇多天皇宸翰御手印遺告, Go-Uda-tennō shinkan gotein yuigō)	Emperor Go-Uda	Testament of Emperor Go-Uda with handprints	Kamakura period, 1308	one rolled scroll, ink on paper, 54.5 cm × 788.8 cm (21.5 in × 310.6 in)	Daikaku-ji, Kyoto	Text in Chinese script on paper with two red handprints.
Letter accompanying a prayer for the prosperity of Tō-ji temple, by Emperor Go-Uda (後宇多天皇宸翰東寺興隆条々事書御添状, Go-Uda-tennō shinkan Tō-ji kōryūjōjō kotogaki onsōjō)	Emperor Go-Uda	Imperial letter praying for the growth of Tō-ji temple, written in the emperor's own handwriting one year after entering the priesthood	Kamakura period, February 12, 1308	one rolled scroll	Tō-ji, Kyoto	Text in Chinese script on paper.
Letter of the Emperor Go-Uda, Promotion of the precepts of the Daigo school (後宇多天皇宸翰当流紹隆教誡, Go-Uda-tennō shinkan tōryū shōryū kyōkai)	Emperor Go-Uda	Three letters in the emperor's own handwriting addressed to a monk of Hōon-in (報恩院), Daigo-ji, with the intention of unifying the Ono (小野) and Hirosawa (広沢) branches of the Shingon sect	Kamakura period, 1309	three letters mounted on a rolled scroll, 32.8 cm × 347.2 cm (12.9 in × 136.7 in)	Daigo-ji, Kyoto	Text in Chinese script on paper.
Model letter by Emperor Go-Saga (後嵯峨天皇宸翰御消息, Go-Saga-tennō shinkan go-shōsoku)	Emperor Go-Saga	Only extant letter of Emperor Go-Saga, addressed to the cloistered Prince Doshin of Ninna-ji	Kamakura period, April 15, 1246	one hanging scroll	Ninna-ji, Kyoto	Chinese script covering half of a paper scroll with ornamental border and red stamp marks on the paper.
Testament by Emperor Go-Daigo (後醍醐天皇宸翰御置文, Go-Daigo-tennō shinkan go-okibumi)	Emperor Go-Daigo	Will in the emperor's own handwriting	Kamakura period, August 24, 1333	one hanging scroll	Daitoku-ji, Kyoto	—
Tenchō injin (後醍醐天皇宸翰天長印信, Go-Daigo-tennō shinkan tenchō injin)	transcription by Emperor Go-Daigo design and postscript by Monkan	Certificate of highest confirmation in Esoteric Buddhism given by the priest Kūkai to his disciple Shinga	Nanboku-chō period, July 23, 1339 (June 16, Engen 4)	one rolled scroll, ink on decorated paper, 32.0 cm × 122.2 cm (12.6 in × 48.1 in)	Daigo-ji, Kyoto	Handwritten Japanese text
Will and testament of Emperor Go-Toba with handprint (後鳥羽天皇宸翰御手印置文, Go-Toba-tennō shinkan gotein okibumi)	Emperor Go-Toba	Will and testament in the emperor's own handwriting with handprints	Kamakura period, February 9, 1239	one hanging scroll	Minase Shrine, Shimamoto, Osaka	Handwritten Japanese text and two red handprints.
Moromichi Diary (後二条殿記, Go-Nijō donoki)	Fujiwara no Moromichi (also known as Go-Nijō Dono) and Fujiwara no Yorinaga (transcription)	Diary of Fujiwara no Moromichi consisting of one volume in his own handwriting covering parts of the year 1093 and 29 volumes transcribed by Fujiwara no Yorinaga	late Heian period, 1083–1099	30 rolled scrolls	Yōmei Bunko, Kyoto	—
Diary of Fujiwara no Michinaga (御堂関白記, Midō Kanpakuki) (Note: Attached to the nomination are an excerpt of the history of an enshrinement hall (御堂御記抄) consisting of five rolled scrolls and one hanging scroll; and an inventory of an enshrinement hall (御堂御暦記目録) consisting of one single-sheet letter.)	Fujiwara no Michinaga	Diary of Fujiwara no Michinaga consisting of 14 volumes in his own handwriting and 12 other volumes. It covers the years from 998 to 1021 with interruptions.	Heian period, 998–1021	26 rolled scrolls, ink on paper	Yōmei Bunko, Kyoto	Japanese text on lined paper looking like notes.
History and Legends of the Kōryū-ji temple (広隆寺縁起資財帳, kōryū-ji engi shizai chō)	—	Catalogue of treasures and historical record of Kōryū-ji	Heian period	one rolled scroll	Kōryū-ji, Kyoto	—
Kōryū-ji shizai kōtai jitsuroku chō (広隆寺資財交替実録帳)	—	Authentic register of property changes of Kōryū-ji temple	Heian period	one rolled scroll	Kōryū-ji, Kyoto	—
Catalogue of imported items (弘法大師請来目録, Kōbō Daishi shōrai mokuroku) (Note: Attached to the nomination is a donation letter from June 21, 1341.)	Saichō	Catalogue of articles brought back to Japan by Kūkai from his trip to Tang dynasty China	Heian period, 9th century	one rolled scroll, ink on paper, 27.0 cm × 885.0 cm (10.6 in × 348.4 in)	Tō-ji, Kyoto	Text in Chinese script on lined paper.
Three letters by Kūkai (弘法大師筆尺牘三通, Kōbō Daishi hitsu sekitoku santsū) (Fūshinjō (風信帖)) (Note: Attached to the nomination are a donation and an escort letter.)	Kūkai	Three letters from Kūkai to Saichō mounted as a scroll	Heian period, 9th century	one rolled scroll, ink on paper, 28.8 cm × 157.9 cm (11.3 in × 62.2 in)	Tō-ji, Kyoto	Fourteen lines of text in rough Chinese script. Thirteen lines of text in rough Chinese script.
Model letter by Emperor Takakura (高倉天皇宸翰御消息, Takakura tennō shinkan goshōsoku) (Note: Attached to the nomination is one hanging scroll of a letter by Shukaku Hosshinnō (守覚法親王))	Emperor Takakura	Only extant letter of Emperor Takakura	Heian period, November 13, 1178	one hanging scroll	Ninna-ji, Kyoto	Calligraphic text in black ink and a red stamp mark saying Ninna-ji temple in Japanese.
Ordination certificate of monk Kōjō (嵯峨天皇宸翰光定戒牒, Saga tennō shinkan kōjō kaichō)	Emperor Saga	Document in the emperor's own handwriting to the priest Kōjō (光定), after his vow to follow the precepts, certifying that Kōjō had undergone the rite known as Bosatsu-kai	Heian period, April 14, 823	one rolled scroll, ink on paper, 37.0 cm × 148.0 cm (14.6 in × 58.3 in)	Enryaku-ji, Ōtsu, Shiga	Text in Chinese script of various size on paper with red stamp marks.
Imperial letters of three rulers (三朝宸翰, sanchō shinkan)	Emperor Hanazono, Emperor Fushimi, Emperor Go-Daigo	—	Kamakura period, 13th and 14th century	two rolled scrolls; 1st scroll: twelve letters by Emperor Hanazono, 2nd scroll: ten letters by Emperor Go-Daigo and two letters by Emperor Fushimi	Maeda Ikutokukai, Tokyo	—
Testament of the priest Jie (慈恵大師自筆遺告, jie daishi jihitsu yuigō)	Ryōgen (Jie Daishi)	Written by the 61-year-old priest Ryōgen, entrusting everything to his pupil Jinzen (尋禅). Contains detailed instructions on the funeral service	Heian period, May, 972	one rolled scroll	Rozan-ji, Kyoto	Testament of Monk Jie
Fragment of a census from 908 in Kuga, Kuga District, Suō Province (周防国玖珂郡玖珂郷延喜八年戸籍残巻, suō-no-kuni kugagun kugagō engi hachinen kosekizankan)	—	Family register of Kuga, Yamaguchi from 908	Heian period, 908	one rolled scroll	Ishiyama-dera, Ōtsu, Shiga	Text on brown aged paper.
Uesugi Family documents (上杉家文書, uesugi-ke monjo) (Note: Attached to the nomination are 325 bound double-leaved (袋とじ, fukuro-toji) books or fourteen copies of a chronological record of successive generations and three covered containers.)	—	Collection of documents handed down in the Uesugi clan	Kamakura period – Edo period	bundle/batch of 2018 letters, 4 bound books and 26 bound double-leaved (袋とじ, fukuro-toji) books	Yonezawa City Uesugi Museum, Yonezawa, Yamagata	Handwritten Japanese text on paper.
True record of articles in the possession of Ninna-ji (仁和寺御室御物実録, Ninna-ji omuro gyobutsu jitsuroku)	—	Catalogue of items offered to the temple treasures by Emperor Uda about ten days before his death	Heian period, January 10, 950	one rolled scroll	Ninna-ji, Kyoto	—
Suisaki (水左記)	Minamoto no Toshifusa	Diary of Sadaijin Minamoto no Toshifusa in his own handwriting	Heian period, 1077 and 1081	two rolled scrolls: one for 1077, one for 1081	Maeda Ikutokukai, Tokyo	—
Imperial rescript of Emperor Shōmu (聖武天皇勅書, Shōmu Tennō chokusho)	Emperor Shōmu	—	Nara period, May 20, 749	one rolled scroll, ink on paper, 29.2 cm × 95.8 cm (11.5 in × 37.7 in)	Heiden-ji (平田寺), Makinohara, Shizuoka	Neatly written Japanese text on yellow paper with red stamp marks.
Origin and history of Ghost Festival at Seigan-ji (誓願寺盂蘭盆縁起, Seigan-ji urabon engi) (Note: One rolled scroll, Origin and history of the construction of Seigan-ji (誓願寺建立縁起, seigan-ji kenritsu engi) is attached to the nomination.)	Eisai	Document on the origin and meaning of the Ghost Festival as transmitted from Song dynasty China	Heian period, July 15, 1178	one rolled scroll, ink on colored paper, 35.3 cm × 154 cm (13.9 in × 60.6 in)	Seigan-ji (誓願寺), Fukuoka, Fukuoka	Japanese text on red-brownish paper.
Letter soliciting donations for the restoration of Sennyū-ji temple (泉涌寺勧縁疏, Sennyū-ji kanenso)	Shunjō	Document on the origins of Sennyū-ji temple	Kamakura period, October 1221	one rolled scroll, ink on paper, 40.6 cm × 296.0 cm (16.0 in × 116.5 in)	Sennyū-ji, Kyoto	Japanese text in large characters on paper.
Surviving passages of memorial presented to Emperor Saga (狸毛筆奉献表, Rimōhitsu hōkenhyō)	Kūkai	Document accompanying the present of four tanuki hair writing brushes to Emperor Saga. According to this document, the brushes were meant to be used for regular, semi-cursive, cursive script and for the hand-copying of sutras respectively.	Heian period	one rolled scroll, 27.6 cm × 65.8 cm (10.9 in × 25.9 in)	Daigo-ji, Kyoto	Black text on white background.
Writings related to the priest Enchin (智証大師関係文書典籍, chishō daishi kankei monjo tenseki)	—	Various documents (Note: 1. Six documents related to his secular surname (family tree) and priestly rank; 2. Five documents related to his trip to China (peaceful prayer and correspondence); 3. Five catalogues of sacred books and sutras obteined in China; 4. Ten documents related to teaching Buddhism; 5. Eight sacred books collected in China; 6. Three documents in his own handwriting; 7. Nine dated and signed messages)	Tang dynasty, Heian period	various	Mii-dera, Ōtsu, Shiga	Carefully written Chinese script on brownish paper.
Essential Teachings for Tendai Lotus Sect Priests (天台法華宗年分縁起, tendai hokkeshū nenbun engi)	attributed to Saichō	Letter addressed to the Imperial Court wishing for an increase of the number of people allowed to enter the priesthood from 10 to 12 per year due to the establishment of Tendai Buddhism	Heian period, 9th century	one rolled scroll, ink on paper, 28.9 cm × 340.3 cm (11.4 in × 134.0 in)	Enryaku-ji, Ōtsu, Shiga	Carefully written Chinese or Japanese script.
Catalogue of Imported Items (伝教大師将来目録, Dengyō-daishi shōrai mokuroku)	Saichō	Catalogue of sacred books brought back by Saichō from Tang dynasty China	Heian period, May 13, 805	one rolled scroll	Enryaku-ji, Ōtsu, Shiga	Text in Chinese script with red stamp marks.
Certificate of priesthood for Saichō and related papers to and from the controller of priesthood (伝教大師度縁案並僧綱牒, Dengyō-daishi Doen-an narabini Sōgō Chō)	—	Three letters on Saichō entering priesthood and his vow to follow the precepts	Nara period, 780–783	one rolled scroll	Raigō-in (来迎院), Kyoto (Sakyō-ku)	
Passing permits for Dengyō-daishi (伝教大師入唐牒, Dengyō-daishi nittōchō)	—	Tang dynasty passing permits for Saichō: from Ningbo in 804 and from Taizhou in 805	Tang dynasty, September 12, 804 and February 805	one rolled scroll, 39.7 cm × 134.2 cm (15.6 in × 52.8 in)	Enryaku-ji, Ōtsu, Shiga	Carefully written Chinese text on grey paper with red stamp marks.
Letter penned by the Saichō monk (伝教大師筆尺牘, Dengyō daishi hitsu sekitoku)	Saichō	Letter known as Kykaku-jō (久隔帖) from Saichō to Taihan (泰範), his favourite student at Takaosan-ji (高雄山寺) (now Jingo-ji)	Heian period, November 25, 813	one hanging scroll, 29.2 cm × 55.2 cm (11.5 in × 21.7 in)	Nara National Museum, Nara	Text in Chinese script
Letter written in kana syllabary (伝藤原行成筆仮名消息, denfujiwara no Yukinari hitsu kana shōsoku)	attributed to Fujiwara no Yukinari	Letter valued for its continuous unbroken calligraphy	Heian period, 10th–11th century	one hanging scroll, 28.2 cm × 420.0 cm (11.1 in × 165.4 in)	Kyūkyodō (鳩居堂), Kyoto	
Documents and treasures of Tō-ji (東寺百合文書, Tō-ji hyakugō monjo) (Note: Attached to the nomination are 94 document boxes donated by Maeda Tsunanori in 1685.)	—	Huge collection of documents covering a lot of ground starting from Shōen or manor related documents and including documents on the economic history and the history of Buddhism	8th century Nara period – late Edo period	bundle/batch of 24,067 items including 3,863 rolled scrolls, 1172 bound double-leaved (袋とじ, fukuro-toji) books, six bound books, 67 hanging scrolls, 13,695 single-sheet letters	Kyoto Prefectural Library and Archives, Kyoto	Japanese or Chinese script and a red oval stamp mark.
Documents of Tōdai-ji (東大寺文書, Tōdai-ji monjo)	—	Collection of documents on the history of Tōdai-ji temple	Heian period – Muromachi period	100 rolled scrolls (with 979 mounted letters), 8,516 single-sheet letters	Tōdai-ji, Nara	Japanese or Chinese text and red stamp marks on brown damaged paper.
Letter by Fujiwara no Sari (藤原佐理筆書状, Fujiwara no Sari hitsu shojō) or Riraku-jō (離洛帖) (Note: Attached to the nomination is one hanging scroll by Konoe Iehiro.)	Fujiwara no Sukemasa/Sari	Written from Shimonoseki on the way to Kyushu where Sasaki had been appointed Dazai no Daini (太宰大弐) (Assistant secretary of Dazaifu Province). Addressed to Fujiwara no Sanenobu (藤原誠信).	Heian period, 991	one hanging scroll, ink on paper, 64.6 cm × 31.7 cm (25.4 in × 12.5 in)	Hatakeyama Memorial Museum of Fine Art, Tokyo	Characters in rough handwriting.
Draft Letters by Fujiwara no Tadamichi (藤原忠通筆書状案, Fujiwara no Tadamichi hitsushojōan)	Fujiwara no Tadamichi	Collection of 25 letters composed as a style manual for letter writing	Heian period, 12th century	one hanging scroll, ink on paper, 31.2 cm × 980.3 cm (12.3 in × 385.9 in)	Kyoto National Museum, Kyoto	Text in Chinese characters of varying strength on a hand scroll.
Stone in Nasu County (那須国造碑, nasu kokuzō hi)	—	Granite stone monument in remembrance of Atai Ide, governor of Nasu, consisting of a standing main stone with a hat stone. The main stone bears a calligraphic inscription (8 lines of 19 characters) which is influenced by the Northern Wei robust style.	Asuka period, end of the 7th century	inscription on stone, height without hat stone: 120 cm (47 in), width: 43.5–48 cm (17.1–18.9 in), hat stone 51 cm x 51 cm x 30 cm (20.1 in x 20.1 in x 11.8 in)	Kasaishi Shrine (笠石神社, kasaishi jinja), Ōtawara, Tochigi	Eight long lines of text in Chinese script.
Ennin's Diary: The Record of a Pilgrimage to China in Search of the Law (入唐求法巡礼行記, nittō guhō junreikōki)	Kanetane (兼胤) (transcription of the original by Ennin)	Transcription of the 9th century original (lost) by Kanetane, a monk at Chōraku-ji (長楽寺), Kyoto	Kamakura period, October 26, 1291 (post scriptum)	four bound books	private (Andō Sekisan Gōshi Company (安藤積産合資会社, andō sekisan gōshi gaisha)), Motosu, Gifu	Title page of an old paper book with a central vertical title and a stamp mark in the top left corner.
Certificate of advanced learning in Buddhism (附法状, Fuhōjō)	Shunjō	Written by the priest Shunjō in the last month before his death for his student Shinkai (心海)	Kamakura period, March 22, 1227	one hanging scroll	Sennyū-ji, Kyoto	—
Priest Mongaku's forty-five article rules and regulations (文覚四十五箇条起請文, mongaku yonjūgokajō kishōmon〉)	Fujiwara no Tadachika	Document requesting the restoration of Jingo-ji temple from Emperor Go-Shirakawa	early Kamakura period, before 1192	one rolled scroll with handprints	Jingo-ji, Kyoto	Texts in Chinese letters on brownish aged paper. A red handprint is placed over the text.
hōkanshū (宝簡集), zoku hōkanshū (続宝簡集), yūzoku hōkanshū (又続宝簡集)	—	Documents on the history, territory, function, etc. of Mount Kōya including letters by Minamoto no Yoritomo, Minamoto no Yoshitsune and Saigyō Hōshi	Heian period – Azuchi-Momoyama period	bundle/batch of 54/77/167 rolled scrolls and 0/6/9 bound double-leaved (袋とじ, fukuro-toji) books	Reihōkan (owned by Kongōbu-ji), Kōya, Wakayama	Japanese text, carefully written. The end of some columns end in squiggles.
Record of Imperial Bequest to the Hōryū-ji temple (法隆寺献物帳, hōryūji kenmotsu chō)	Fujiwara no Nakamaro, Fujiwara no Nagate, Koma Fukushin, Kamo Tsunotari and Kazuragi Henushi	Record of the objects bequeathed to the Hōryū-ji temple by Empress Kōken on occasion of the death of Emperor Shōmu	Nara period, July 8, 756	one rolled scroll, ink on paper 27.8 cm × 70.6 cm (10.9 in × 27.8 in)	Gallery of Hōryū-ji Treasures, Tokyo National Museum, Tokyo	Text in carefully written Chinese script on a light paper with some yellow-brownish aging marks. Behind the text there are large stamps in red.
The Record of the Clear Moon (明月記, meigetsuki) (Note: Attached to the nomination are one scroll of a supplementary manuscript, and 10 pages of the former binding mounted on one rolled scroll.)	Fujiwara no Teika	Comprehensive diary in classical Chinese, covering the life of the author from age 18 to his death.	Kamakura period, ca. 1180–1241	58 rolled scrolls and one hanging scroll	Reizei-ke Shiguretei Bunko (冷泉家時雨亭文庫), Kyoto and private collection	Japanese text on pink paper and red annotations to the text.
Letter of dismissal by Rigen Daishi (理源大師筆処分状, rigen daishi hitsu shobunshō)	Rigen Daishi (理源大師)	Written by the priest and founder of Daigo-ji Rigen Daishi (Shōbō (聖宝))	Heian period, June 2, 907	one rolled scroll, 31.8 cm × 45.0 cm (12.5 in × 17.7 in)	Daigo-ji, Kyoto	—
List of Ritual Implements of Esoteric Buddhism and other objects brought back by the Priest Saichō (羯磨金剛目録, katsuma kongō mokuroku)	Saichō	An inventory of 66 items that Saichō brought back from China and stored at Hiezan in 805	Heian period, July 17, 811	one rolled scroll, 27.9 cm × 37.0 cm (11.0 in × 14.6 in)	Enryaku-ji, Ōtsu, Shiga	About ten lines of text in Chinese script of different strength. There are about 30 red stamps underlying the text.
Epistle to Zhongfeng Mingben (与中峰明本尺牘, yochūhō myōhon sekitoku)	Zhao Mengfu	Letters to the priest Zhongfeng Mingben (Chung Feng Ming Pen) in the style of Wang Xizhi expressing Zhao Mengfu's deep love and respect to Zhongfeng	Yuan dynasty, 14th century	one bound book with six letters, ink on paper, 35.1 cm × 22.1 cm (13.8 in × 8.7 in),...	Seikadō Bunko Art Museum, Tokyo	Text in Chinese characters and two red stamps.
Map of rice fields in Naruto, Imizu District, Etchū Province (越中国射水郡鳴戸村墾田図, Etchū no kuni imizu-gun naruto-mura konden-zu)	—	Map of rice fields in Naruto (today central Takaoka), a former manor of Tōdai-ji. The map had been in the possession of Tōdai-ji.	Nara period, 759	unbound, ink and light color on linen cloth, 79.8 cm × 140.5 cm (31.4 in × 55.3 in)	Nara National Museum, Nara, Nara	Sheet with a line-drawing of a checkerboard. About half of all fields are labeled by Japanese or Chinese text.
Mokkan excavated at the Heijō Palace ruins (平城宮跡出土木簡, Heijōkyū seki shutsudo mokkan)	—	Collection of 3184 wooden tablets (mokkan) discovered at the Heijō Palace site and used in government and economic affairs during the ritsuryō system.	Nara period	inscribed tablets, ink on wood	Nara National Research Institute for Cultural Properties, Nara, Nara	—
Tagajō Stele (多賀城碑, tagajō-hi)	—	Stone stele with an inscription commemorating repairs of Taga Castle in 762. It is one of four ancient stele and mentioned in Oku no hosomichi by Matsuo Bashō.	Nara period, 762	inscription on stone, total height of stone: 248 cm (98 in) (above ground 196 cm (77 in)), maximum width: 103 cm (41 in), maximum depth: 72 cm (28 in)	Tagajō, Miyagi	

== See also ==
- Nara Research Institute for Cultural Properties
- Tokyo Research Institute for Cultural Properties
- Independent Administrative Institution National Museum
