= Heiden-ji =

Buddhist temple in Makinohara, Shizuoka, Japan

- 平田寺
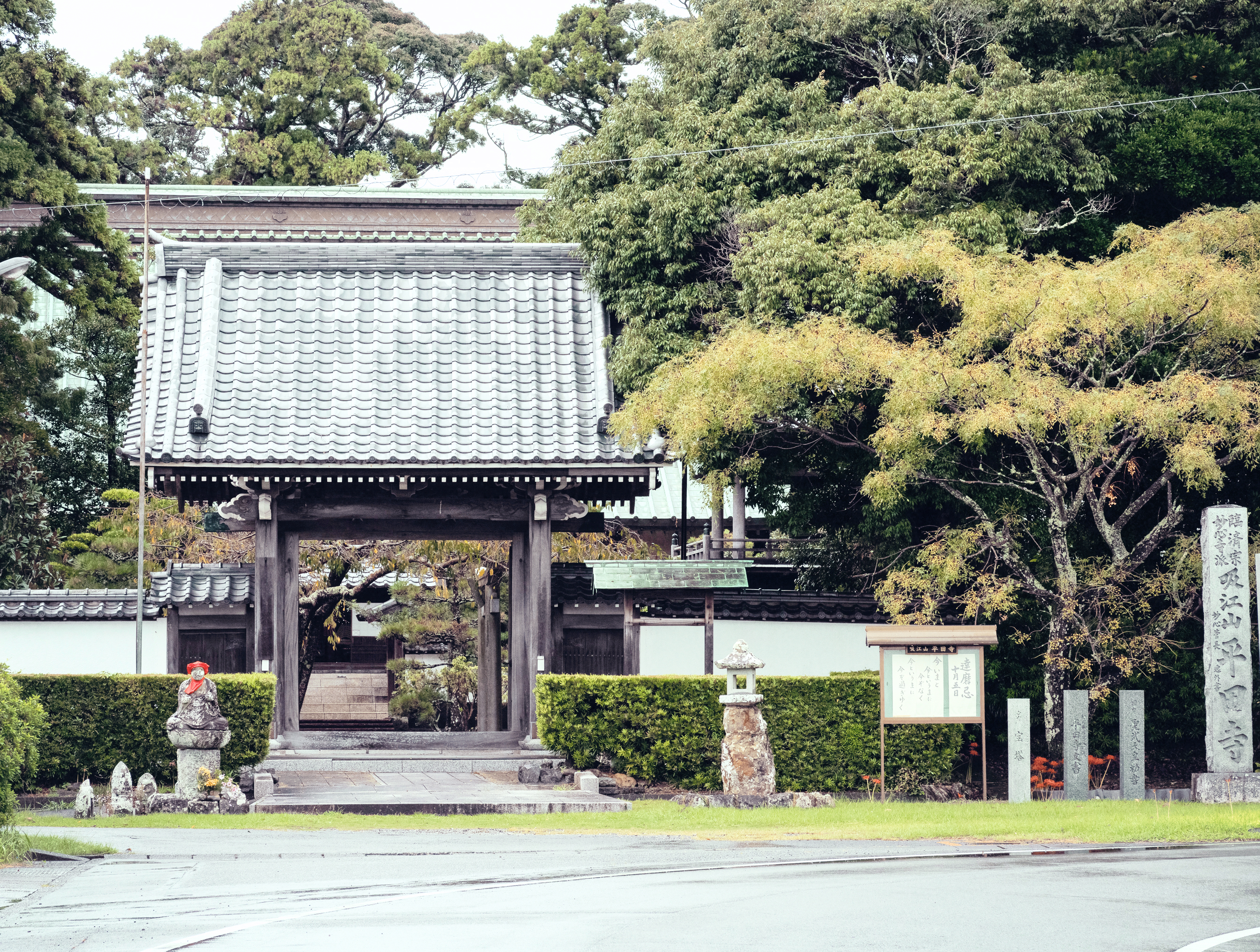
- Heiden-ji Sanmon

- Location within Shizuoka Prefecture Location within Japan

Religion
- Affiliation: Buddhist
- Deity: Shaka Nyorai
- Rite: Rinzai school
- Status: functional

Location
- Location: 459 Ōe, Makinohara-shi, Shizuoka-ken
- Country: Japan
- Coordinates: 34°41′39″N 138°12′9″E

Architecture
- Founder: Ryūhō Kōun
- Completed: 1283

Heiden-ji (平田寺) is a Buddhist temple located in the Ōe neighborhood of the city of Makinohara, Shizuoka Prefecture, Japan. It belongs to the Myoshin-ji branch of the Rinzai school of Japanese Zen and its honzon (primary image) is a statue of Shaka Nyorai. The temple's full name is Kyukozan Heiden-ji (吸江山 平田寺).

== History ==
Heiden-ji was founded in 1283 by Ryūhō Kōun (the son of Uesugi Yorishige and uncle of Ashikaga Takauji). Ryūhō Kōun was a grand-disciple of Mugaku Sogen. The temple was destroyed by fire at the end of the Sengoku period, but was rebuilt in 1786 by Tanuma Okitsugu, the daimyō of Sagara Domain. It became a bodaiji of the Tanuma clan and houses the ihai of generations of clan chieftains. The current Main Hall dates from this time, and has a private entrance for the Tanuma clan. This structure is a designated cultural property of Makinohara city.

== Cultural Properties ==
=== National Treasure ===
- Emperor Shōmu's Imperial Rescript (聖武天皇勅書, Shōmu Tennō chokusho), Nara period. This document is dated May 20, 749 and is one rolled scroll, ink on paper, 29.2 cm × 95.8 cm. It bears the handwriting of Emperor Shōmu as well as the signatures of Tachibana no Moroe (Minister of the Left) and Fujiwara no Toyonari (Minister of the Right). The reason why such an imperial edict is in the temple's possession is unknown. However, it was already in the temple's possession as of 1818.

=== Shizuoka Prefecture Designated Tangible Cultural Properties ===
- Hōtō Pagoda (平田寺宝塔), Kamakura period (1310). This sandstone monument has a total height of 1.91 meters. It consists of four parts: base, tower body, roof, and finial.
- Heiden-ji documents (平田寺文書). This is a collection of 47 ancient documents dating from the Kamakura period to the Edo period, including documents bearing the Imagawa clan seal, and vermilion seal documents of the Tokugawa clan.

== See also ==
- List of National Treasures of Japan (ancient documents)
