= Sagara Oil Field =

Former Japanese oil field (1873-1955)

Sagara oil field
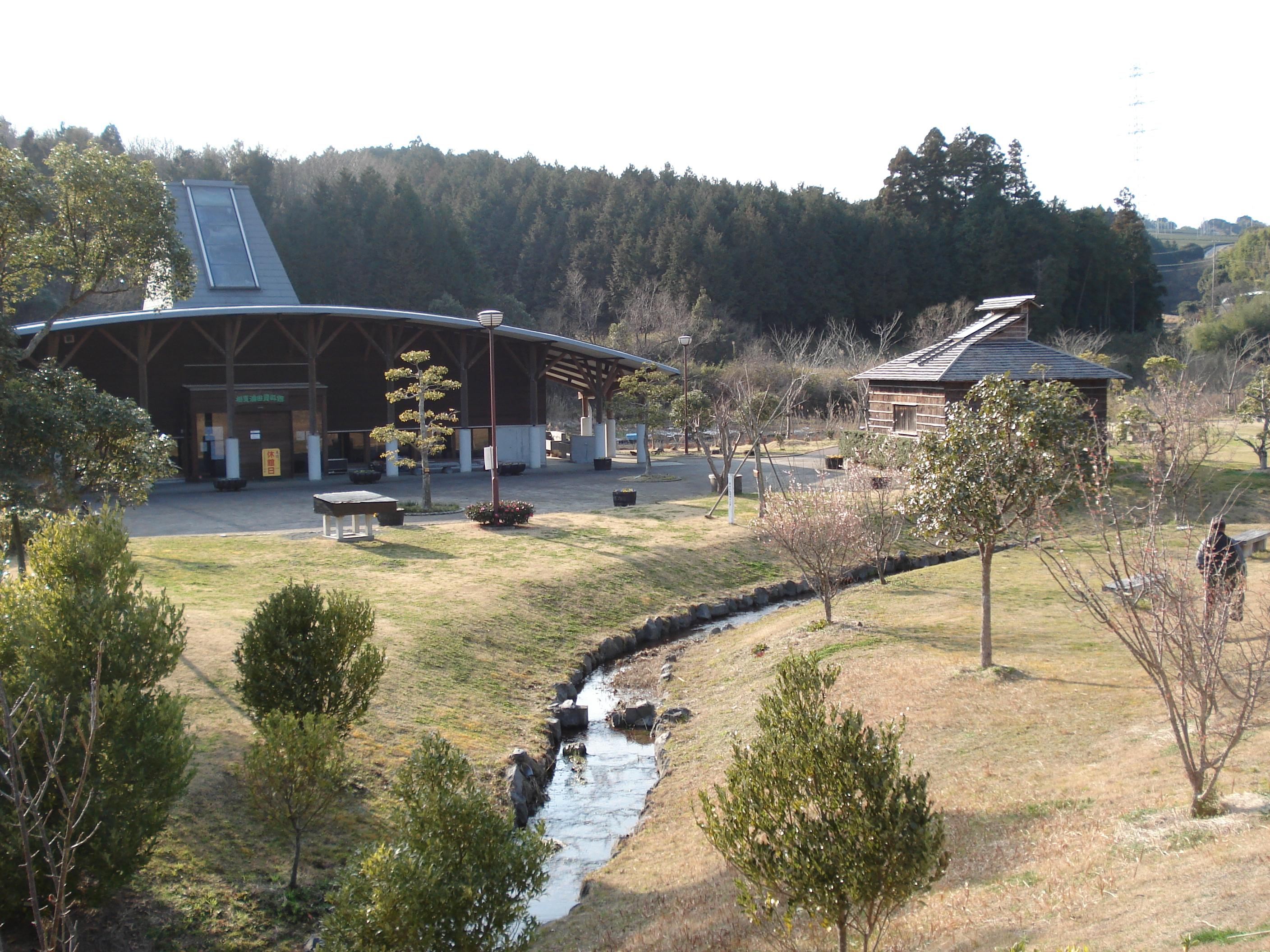
- Sagara Oil Field Park
- Country: Japan
- Region: Shizuoka Prefecture
- Location: Makinohara
- Offshore/onshore: Onshore
- Coordinates: 34°41′53″N 138°09′35″E

Field history
- Discovery: May 1873
- Start of production: 1873
- Peak year: 1884
- Abandonment: 1955

Sagara Oil Field (相良油田, Sagara Yuden) is located in Makinohara, Shizuoka Prefecture, Japan. It was one of Japan’s earliest oilfields.

== History ==
Crude oil was discovered at Sagara Village in May 1873, and hand-pumping operations began almost immediately. From 1874, Nippon Oil (the predecessor to modern ENEOS) began mechanical pumping operations. The Sagara field was the only producing oil field on Japan's Pacific coast, and was the first in Japan to use oil pumps.

At the height of its production (in 1884), some 600 people were employed, and the field was producing 4,537 barrels of oil (721 kiloliters) per year. The oil was very light, and could be used in automobiles without refining.

Production stopped in 1955, with the advent of cheap, imported oil. On November 28, 1980, the oil field was proclaimed a natural monument and protected cultural property by the Shizuoka Prefectural government, and was transformed into a public park.
