= Sagara Castle =

Castle in Makinohara, Japan

Coordinates: 34°41′12.5″N 138°11′53.5″E

Sagara Castle 相良城
- Makinohara, Shizuoka Prefecture, Japan
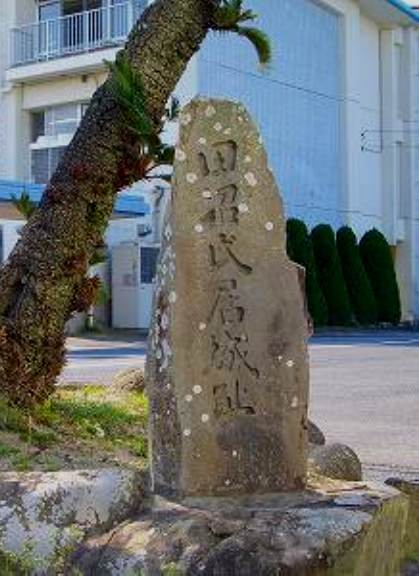
- Site of Sagara jin'ya

Site information
- Type: flatland-style Japanese castle
- Open to the public: yes
- Condition: ruins

Location
- Location within Shizuoka Prefecture Location within Japan

Site history
- Built: 1767
- Built by: Tanuma Okitsugu
- In use: Edo period
- Demolished: 1786

Sagara Castle (相良城, Sagara-jō) was a Japanese castle located in what is now the city of Makinohara, central Shizuoka Prefecture, Japan. At the end of the Edo period, Sagara Castle had been degraded to a jin'ya and was home to the Tanuma clan, daimyō of Sagara Domain.

== Background ==
Sagara Castle is located near the present-day Makinohara city hall and is situated on a plateau between the Ōi River and Cape Omaezaki within the former province of Tōtōmi. Although located some distance south of the route of the Tōkaidō highway connecting Edo with Kyoto, the area prospered because of its port and due to sat production. The castle was first built by the local Sagara clan during the late Heian period beside a curve of the Hagima River. During the Sengoku period, after Takeda Katsuyori captured Takatenjin Castle in 1575, he also seized this fortification and rebuilt it as a strategic point to control the logistics chain between Takatenjin and his holdings in Suruga Province. After the fall of the Takeda clan, the castle came under the control of Tokugawa Ieyasu, who built a residence on its grounds in 1584 for use as a resting place while he visited the area for falconry hunting.

Following the establishment of the Tokugawa shogunate, the area around Sagara was initially tenryō territory administered directly by the shogunate. However, in 1710 a cadet branch of the Honda clan was awarded a small domain and moved his seat to Sagara. As his kokudaka was small, he was not allowed the honor of a castle, and the fortification became a jin'ya

== History ==
In 1767, Sagara was awarded to Tanuma Okitsugu, rōjū to Shōgun Tokugawa Yoshimune, Tokugawa Ieharu and Tokugawa Ieshige. He is known for the Tenmei economic reforms. At the time, the shogunate was in a dire economic situation with the development of a monetary economy outstripping the traditional rice-based stipend system for the samurai class, which caused ever increasing debt. The government applied fiscal restraint by reducing the budget, increasing tax and suppression of commerce, but this also bought deflation. Tanuma used the opposite approach, encouraged commerce and protected merchants through guilds in exchange of taxes. He also adopted positive fiscal policy such as increase of monetary base, and made large scale public works projects. These policy intended to increase tax revenue by developing of economy. Due to the initial successes of his reforms, and his close relations with the shogun, he was promoted from a relatively low status to daimyō and was allowed to construct an actual castle on the site of the Sagara jin'ya.

The castle took 12 years to complete, and was on a large scale with am inner bailey, second and third bailey, and an outer enclosure, all surrounded by moats and stone walls. The total dimensions of the castle were approximately 500 meter by 400 meters. Also of note was that Tanuma constructed a three-story donjon, which was very rare for the mid-Edo period. He also developed the town surrounding the castle as a jōkamachi and encouraged the development of commerce.

However, this period of prosperity did not last. Tanuma made many enemies in his rise from relative obscurity, and conservative strongly disapproved of his commerce-based reforms. His administration was accused of massive corruption. The Great Tenmei famine and a eruption of Mount Asama caused further disruption, and increasing inflation caused riots in Edo. With the death of Shogun Tokugawa Ieharu, Tanuma fell from favor and was demoted to Shimomura Domain in Mutsu Province. Sagara reverted to tenryō status, and Sagara Castle was destroyed after only 10 years of its completion.

In 1823, Tanuma Okitsugu's son was allowed to return to Sagara, but with a kokudaka of only 10,000 koku. He was allowed only a jin'ya, which he built on the ruins of the former castle, and from which the Tanuma clan ruled until the Meiji restoration. All that remains of the fortifications today are some partial stone walls. However, the daimyō palace survived and was relocated to a temple located in the neighboring city of Fujieda.

== Literature ==
- Schmorleitz, Morton S. (1974). Castles in Japan. Tokyo: Charles E. Tuttle Co. pp. 144–145. ISBN 0-8048-1102-4.
- Motoo, Hinago (1986). Japanese Castles. Tokyo: Kodansha. p. 200 pages. ISBN 0-87011-766-1.
- Mitchelhill, Jennifer (2004). Castles of the Samurai: Power and Beauty. Tokyo: Kodansha. p. 112 pages. ISBN 4-7700-2954-3.
- Hall, John Whitney (1955). Tanuma Okitsugu (1719-1788): Forerunner of Modern Japan. Harvard University Press. p. 222 pages. ISBN 0674868218.
