= Fukamushicha =

Kind of green tea

Fukamushi 深蒸し
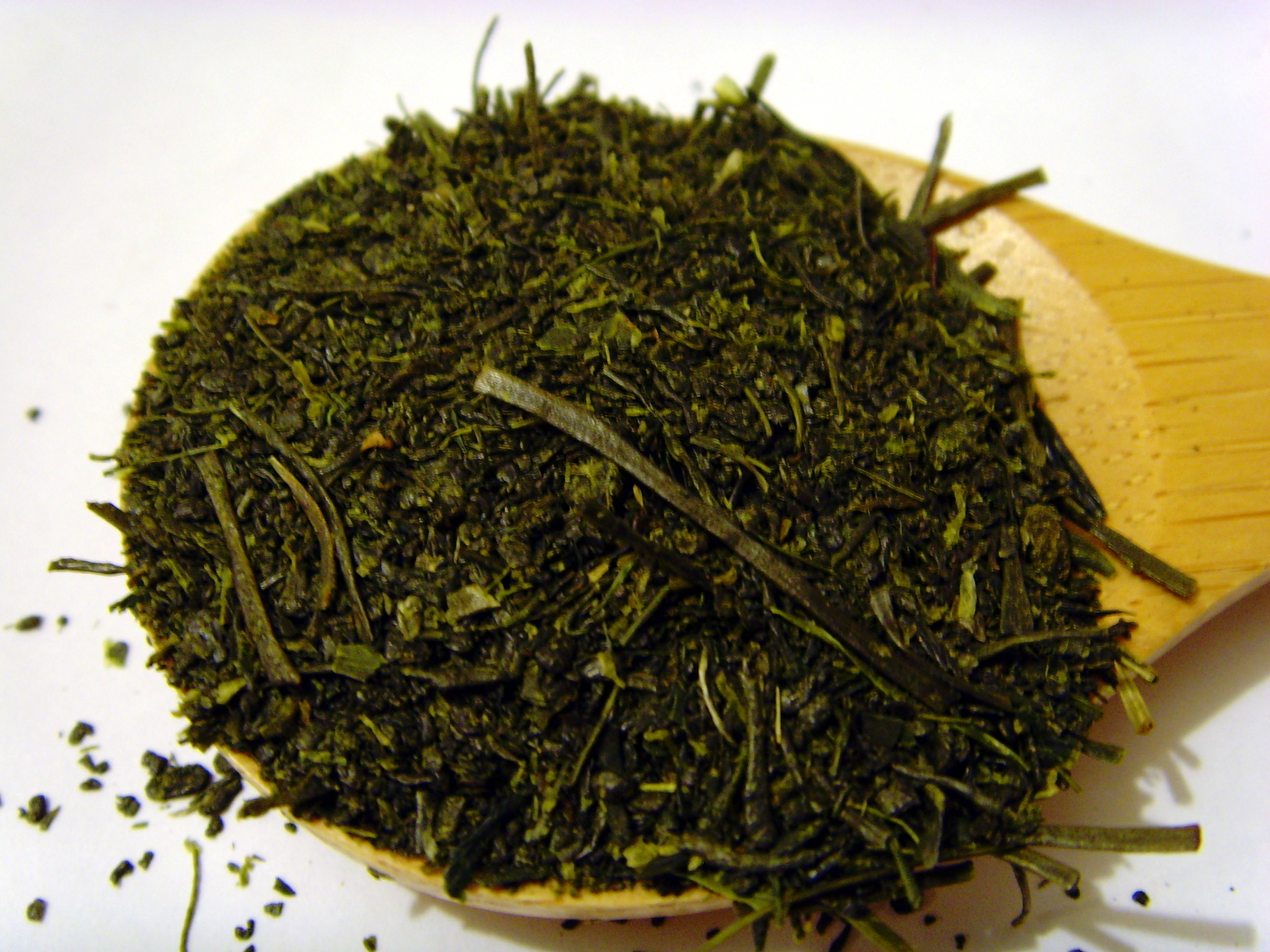
- Type: Green
- Other names: Long-term steamed
- Origin: Japan
- Temperature: 80°C / 176°F
- Time: 1 min

Fukamushi (深蒸し) or fukamushicha (Japanese: 深蒸し茶, lit. 'deep-steamed tea') is a type of Japanese sencha which has been deeply steamed (meaning its raw leaves undergo a relatively long steaming process of 1 to 3 minutes). This process results in tea with a fine powdery texture, a dark green infusion, and a rich flavor. It is usually brewed with water between 70 and 90 degrees Celsius, and for roughly 30 seconds.

== History ==
Fukamushicha emerged around the 1960s in Shizuoka prefecture with its exact origin being claimed by multiple towns and cities: Kikugawa, Makinohara, Kakegawa, and Shimada.

Due to relatively low tea exports at the time, Japanese tea producers sought to invigorate the domestic market by experimenting with longer steaming times. The result was a tea of rich flavor, mild aroma and little to no bitterness.

Today, fukamushicha is produced in many Japanese prefectures and makes up a large proportion of Japanese tea production.

== Process ==
This method is intended to alter the flavor and appearance of the tea. Fresh tea leaves are steamed to neutralize the enzymes that cause oxidization. After this, they are kneaded and dried.

It can be combined with other tea production methods, leading to options such as fukamushi kabusecha, which would be fukamushi made from tea grown in the shade prior to harvesting. Fukamushicha can be made with leaves of sencha and gyokuro.

== See also ==
- Sencha
- Japanese tea
