= Makimono =

Makimono (Japanese 巻物: "rolled thing") may refer to:

- Makimono, a horizontal type of Japanese handscroll/scroll
- Emakimono (lit. "picture scroll"), a horizontal picture scroll
- Makimono (sushi) (lit. "rolled sushi"), a type of sushi

== See also ==
- Kakemono, a vertical Japanese scroll painting
