= Statue of Yakushi Nyorai (Jingo-ji) =

Japanese Buddhist sculpture

- 木造薬師如来立像 (もくぞうやくしにょらいりゅうぞう) (Japanese)
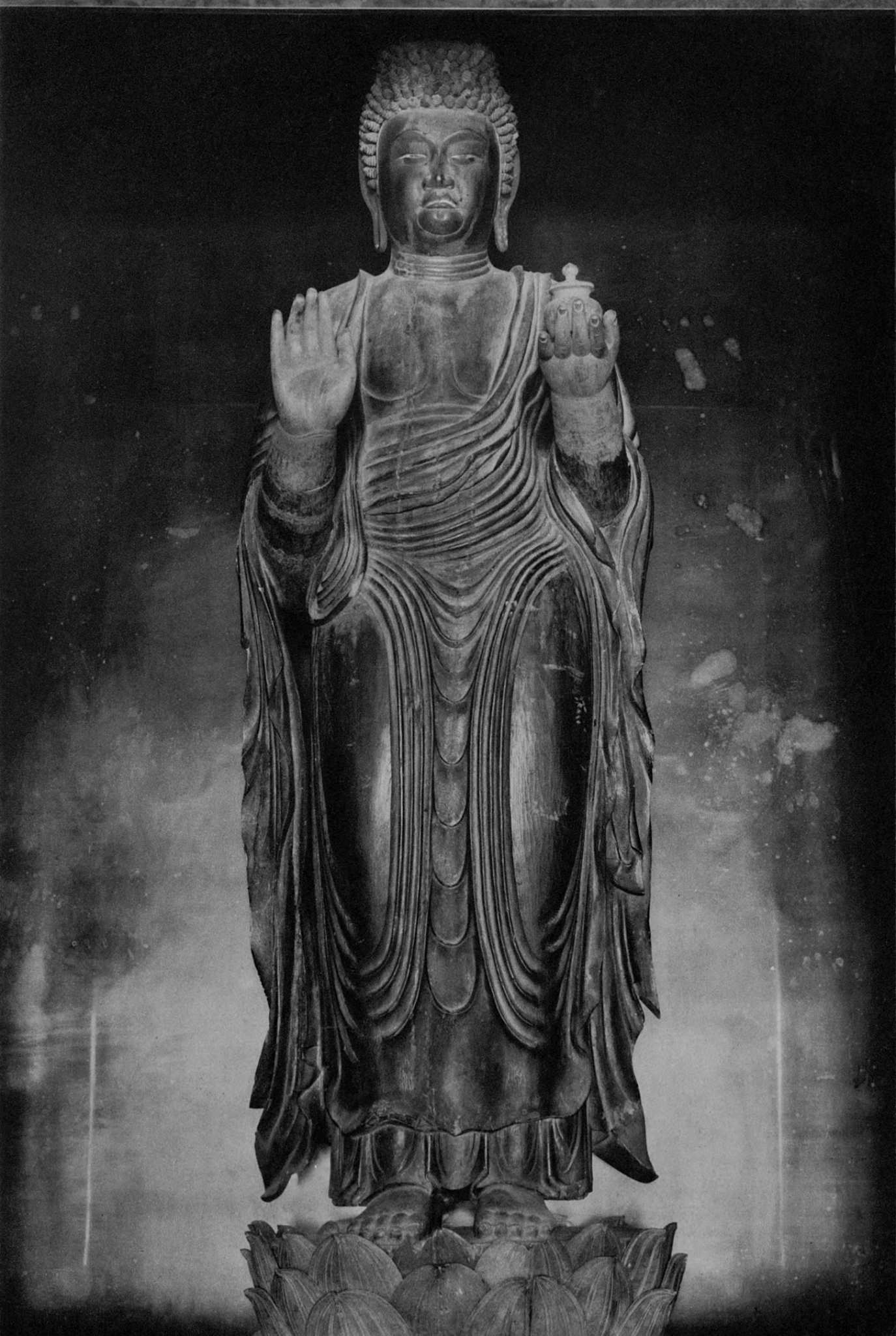
- Photograph by Ken Domon, 1952
- Year: late 8th-early 9th century
- Catalogue: 201/164
- Medium: hinoki
- Movement: Early Heian Art
- Subject: Yakushi Nyorai
- Dimensions: 169.7 cm (66.8 in)
- Designation: National Treasure
- Location: Kyoto, Japan
- Owner: Jingo-ji

The Statue of Yakushi Nyorai (Japanese: 木造薬師如来立像, Hepburn: Mokuzō Yakushi Nyorai Ritsuzō) is a late 8th to early 9th-century Japanese Buddhist sculpture dating to the early Heian period depicting the standing figure of Bhaisajyaguru, or the Medicine Buddha. Designated a National Treasure of Japan, the Yakushi Nyorai serves as the principal figure of worship at Jingo-ji, Ukyō-ku, Kyoto. It is deemed a significant masterpiece of early Heian art, as well as a major icon of Shingon Buddhist history. Its primary sculptor remains anonymous.

Primarily housed in the Kondō of Jingo-ji, it has left the temple for the first time since its creation, as part of a special exhibit at the Tokyo National Museum, in 2024.

== Description ==
The Yakushi Nyorai statue is 169.7 centimetres (5 ft 6.8 in) tall and is carved from a single block of hinoki cypress wood. The left hand and arm and the right hand and forearm were carved separately, the former holding a medicine jar and the latter forming an abhayamudra. Compared to earlier sculptures from the Nara period, the sculptor opted towards a more a stylistic tone of the body. The Yakushi Nyorai has increased body mass, a longer lower torso, and robes that accentuate the width of the hips and legs.

With its protruding belly and plump features, the Yakushi Nyorai reflects the influences of the Gupta period and Mathura style art that first arrived in Tang China during the 8th century, and influenced Japanese art in turn. These proportions contrast the slimmer Buddhas of the earlier Northern Wei and Sui dynasties. This results in the date of creation sometimes being narrowed down to 782-793.

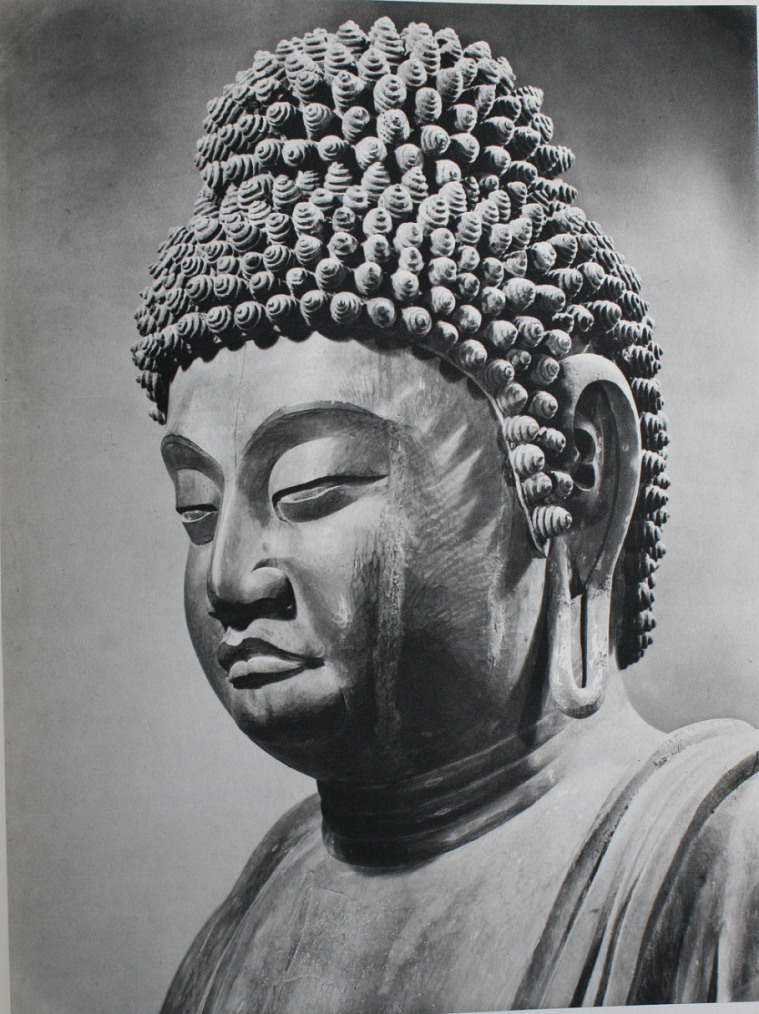
Photo by Manshichi Sakamoto, 1953

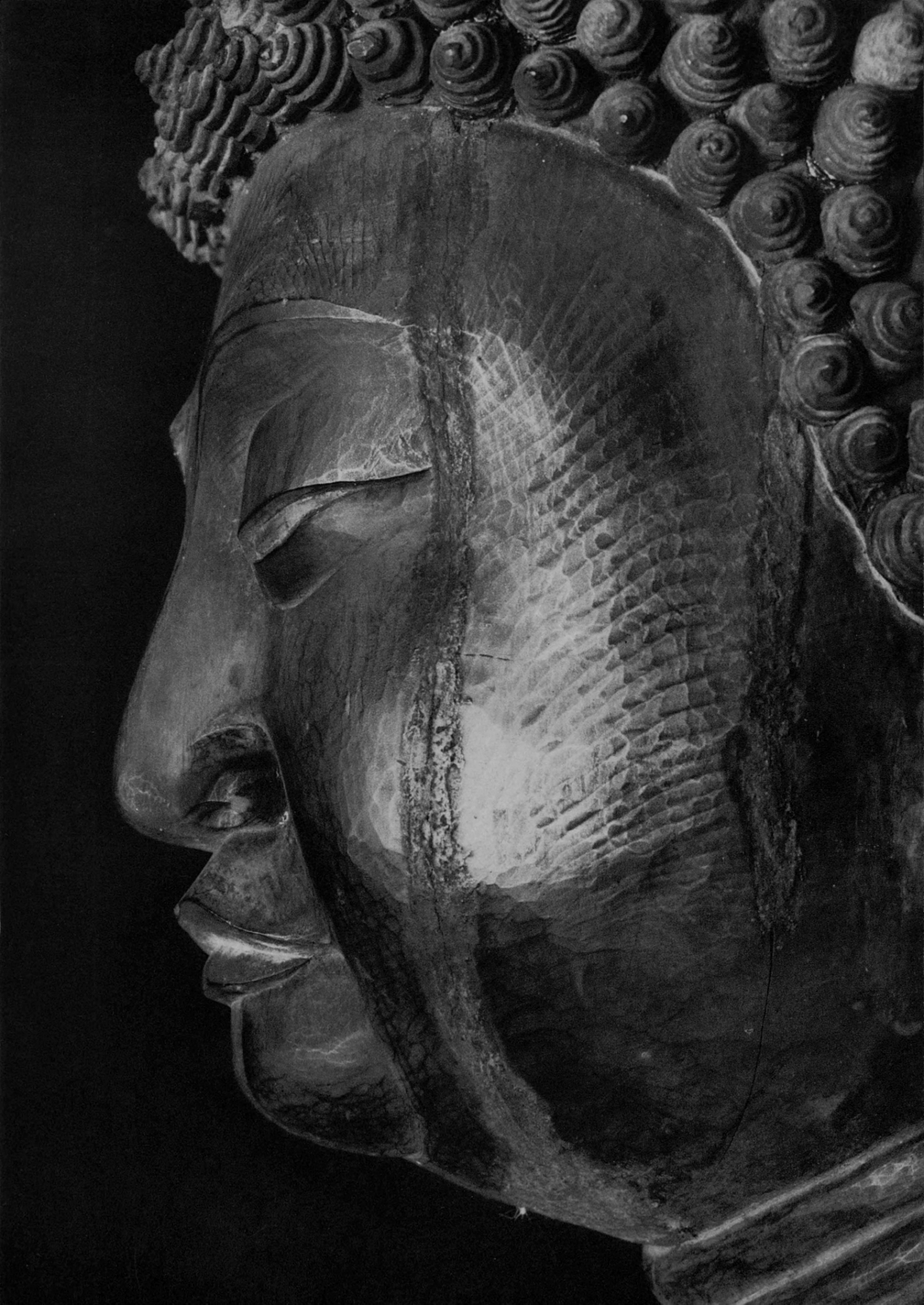
Side profile by Ken Domon; chisel marks are prominent on the cheeks.

The minimalistic embellishment of the hinoki is the signature of the early Heian "plain-wood style". A light amount of pigment was utilized on the Yakushi Nyorai, with a metallic green tone of the hair, white sclera, black pupils, and cinnabar lips. Remnants of chisel marks on the face also accentuate the wood as an essential medium of the sculpture.

The face was carved to evoke power and presence with an exaggerated cranial bump, elongated earlobes, broad cheeks, large lips, and exaggerated limbs, which differs from the slimmer build of a Yakushi Nyorai held at Tōshōdai-ji. When placed on an altar, its life-sized height and placement above the worshipper is designed for an imposing presence. Lighting from the candles in the hall would animate the face of the Medicine Buddha. The statue has remained mostly intact throughout its existence; the medicine jar and the hair curls are the only parts that have been restored.

== History and provenance ==
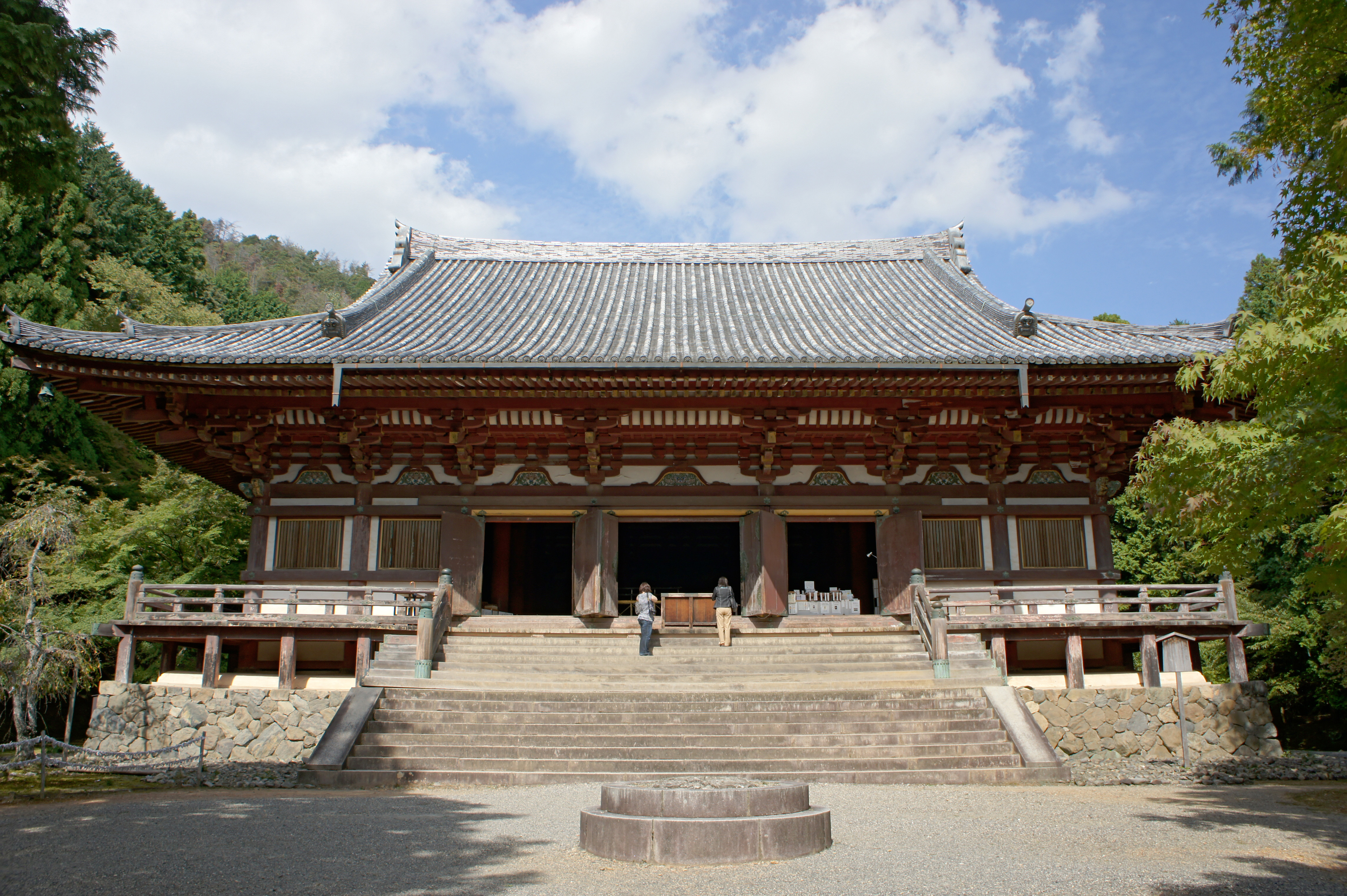
The Kondō, which holds the statue

The Jingo-ji temple was established in 823 by Wake no Kiyomaro, advisor to Emperor Kanmu, as the result of the merging of two temples, Jigan-ji and Takaosan-ji. As a result, there have been many debates about the provenance of the statue and which temple it is originally from.

Records studied by Adachi Kō indicate that the statue was part of Jigan-ji by Wake no Kiyomaro based upon the Jingoji ryakki (神護寺略記; Brief History of Jingo-ji, 1315), which in turn derives records of temple history from the Kōnin shizaichō (弘仁資財帳; Temple Asset Records from the Kōnin Era, 810–824), and the Jingoji jōhei jitsurokuchō (神護寺承平實録帳; Record of the True History of Jingoji from the Jōhei Era, 931), which confirms the Yakushi Nyorai's presence in the inventories with its height of five shaku (169.7 cm).

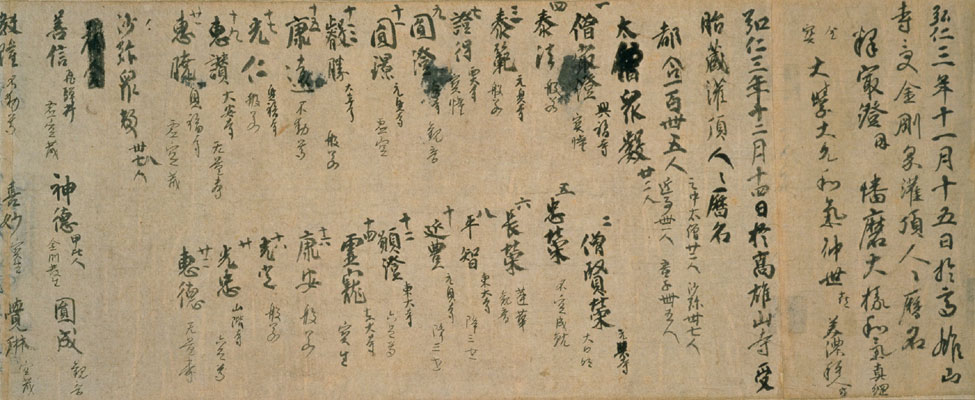
Abhisheka ceremony held in Takaosan-ji/Jingo-ji by Kūkai, during the administrative management of the 9th century, designated National Treasure

A newer theory by historians Nakano Tadaaki and Nagaoka Ryūsaku uses the timeline of the publication of the Kōnin shizaichō, as well as inventory management of temple assets when Kūkai was present, to establish a three temple network (sangō) in the area, which points to Takaosan-ji as the origin of the statue.

In addition, the Ruijū Kokushi and the Nihon Sandai Jitsuroku, which provided insight into temple asset merging and transitioning, described the land around Jigan-ji as sandy, muddy, and impure, and that transferring "dirty items" over to a new space is classified as defilement, which would require said items to undergo purification. With no record of the Yakushi Nyorai getting "purified", Nagaoka surmises that the statue is from Takanosan-ji, which was established by Wake no Kiyomaro's sons. In either case, the icon has borne witness to the administrative changes and transition of the region, which were overseen by Kukai and Saichō during the early 9th century.

== National recognition ==
The sculpture was designated an Important Cultural Property in 17 April 1902 during the Meiji era. Almost fifty years later, it gained the status of National Treasure on 9 June 1951, under registration number 00002. As a nationally recognized piece of art, it has appeared in many textbooks on the history of Japanese art.

In 2024, the statue was removed from Jingo-ji for the first time as part of a special exhibit organized by the Tokyo National Museum. The exhibit commemorated the 1200th anniversary of the temple's establishment and the 1250th anniversary of the birth of Kūkai, the founder of the esoteric Shingon school of Buddhism.
