= Jingo-ji =

Buddhist temple on Mount Takao in Kyoto, Japan

Coordinates: 35°3′18.06″N 135°40′15.12″E

Jingo-ji 神護寺
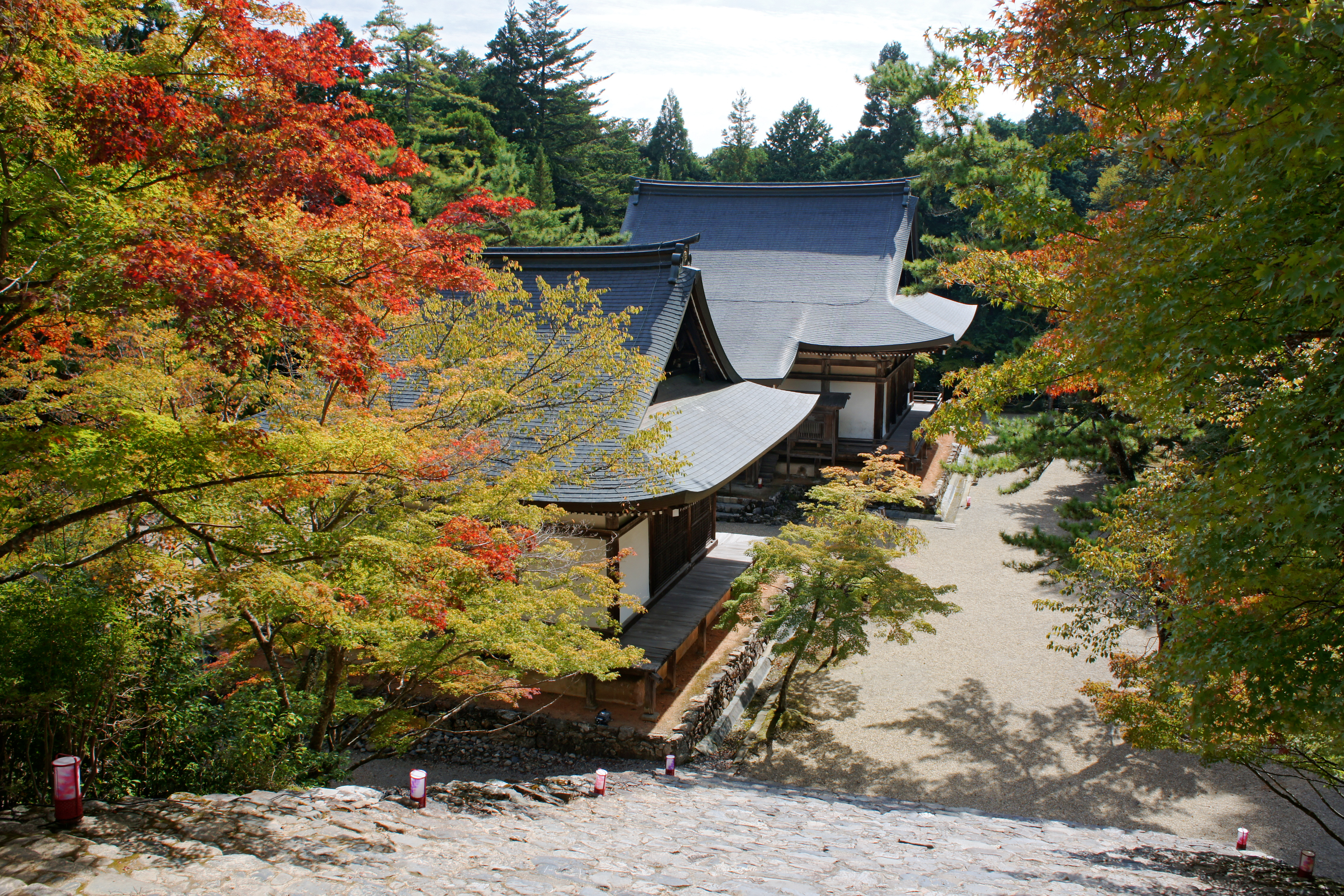
- Godai-dō (left) and Bishamon-dō (right)

Religion
- Affiliation: Shingon Buddhism

Location
- Location: 5 Takao-chō, Ume-ga-hata, Ukyō-ku Kyoto, Kyoto Prefecture
- Country: Japan
- Interactive map of Jingo-ji 神護寺

Architecture
- Established: 824
- Completed: 1934 (Reconstruction)

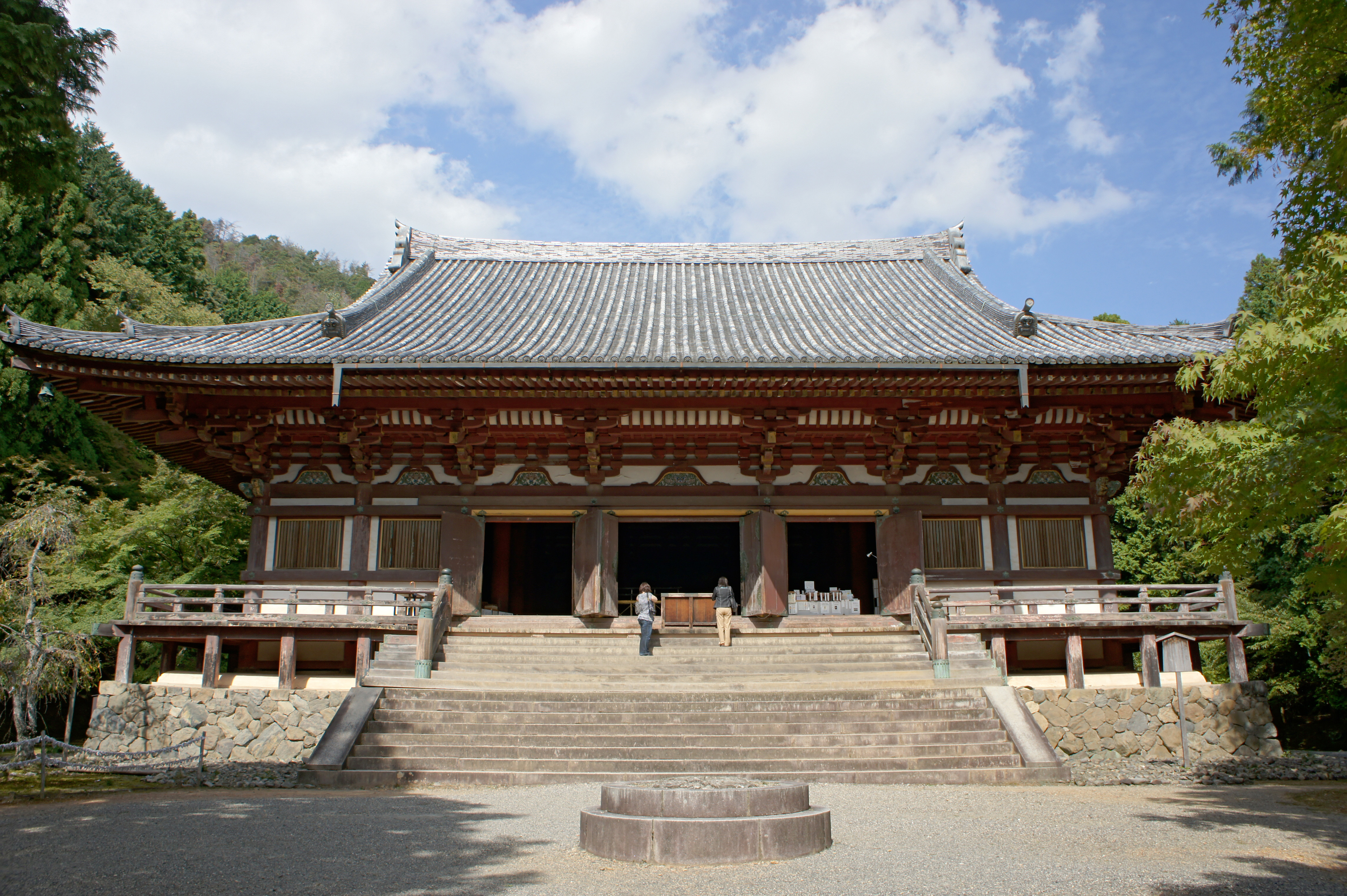
Kondō

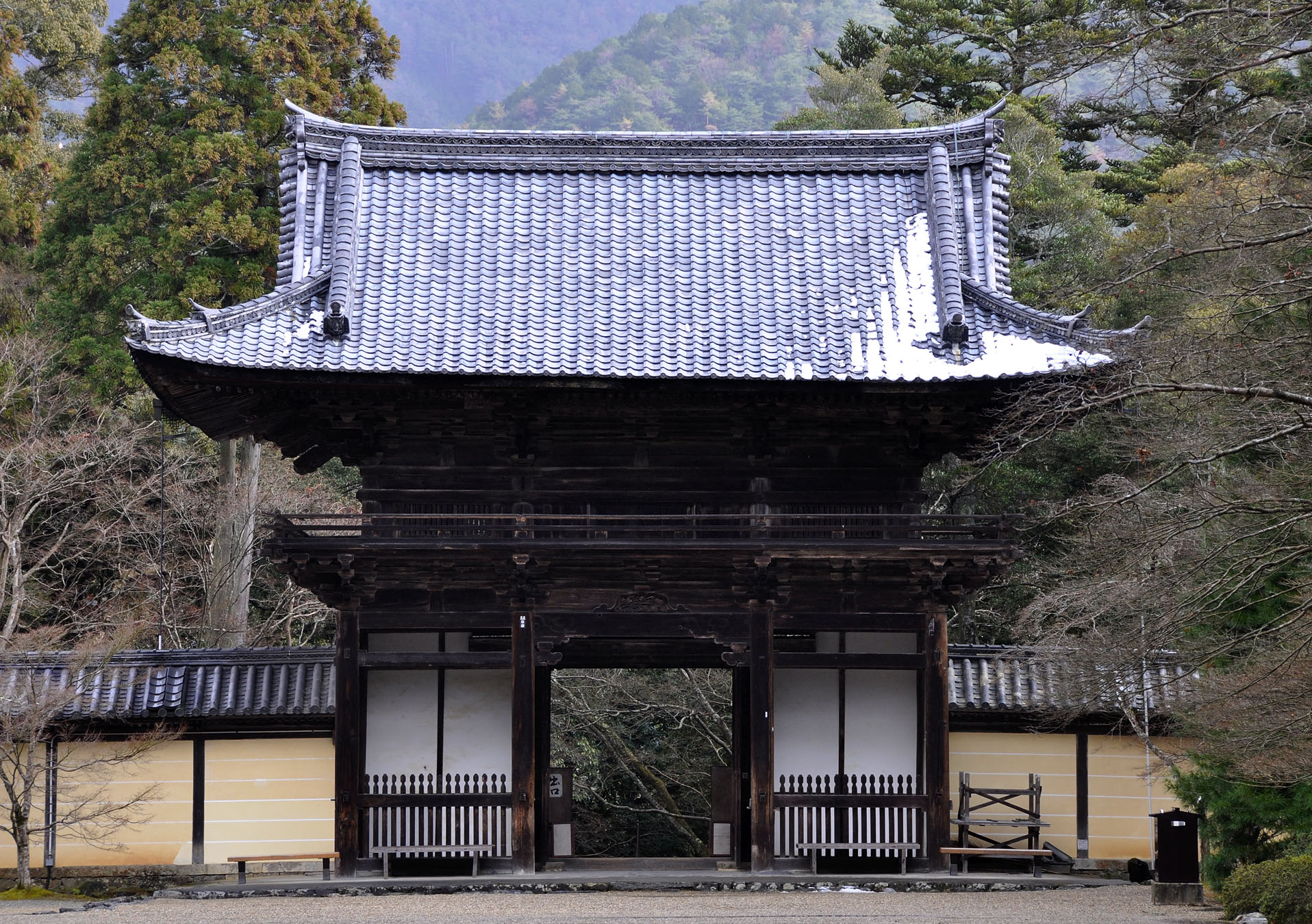
Rōmon (view from within the temple)

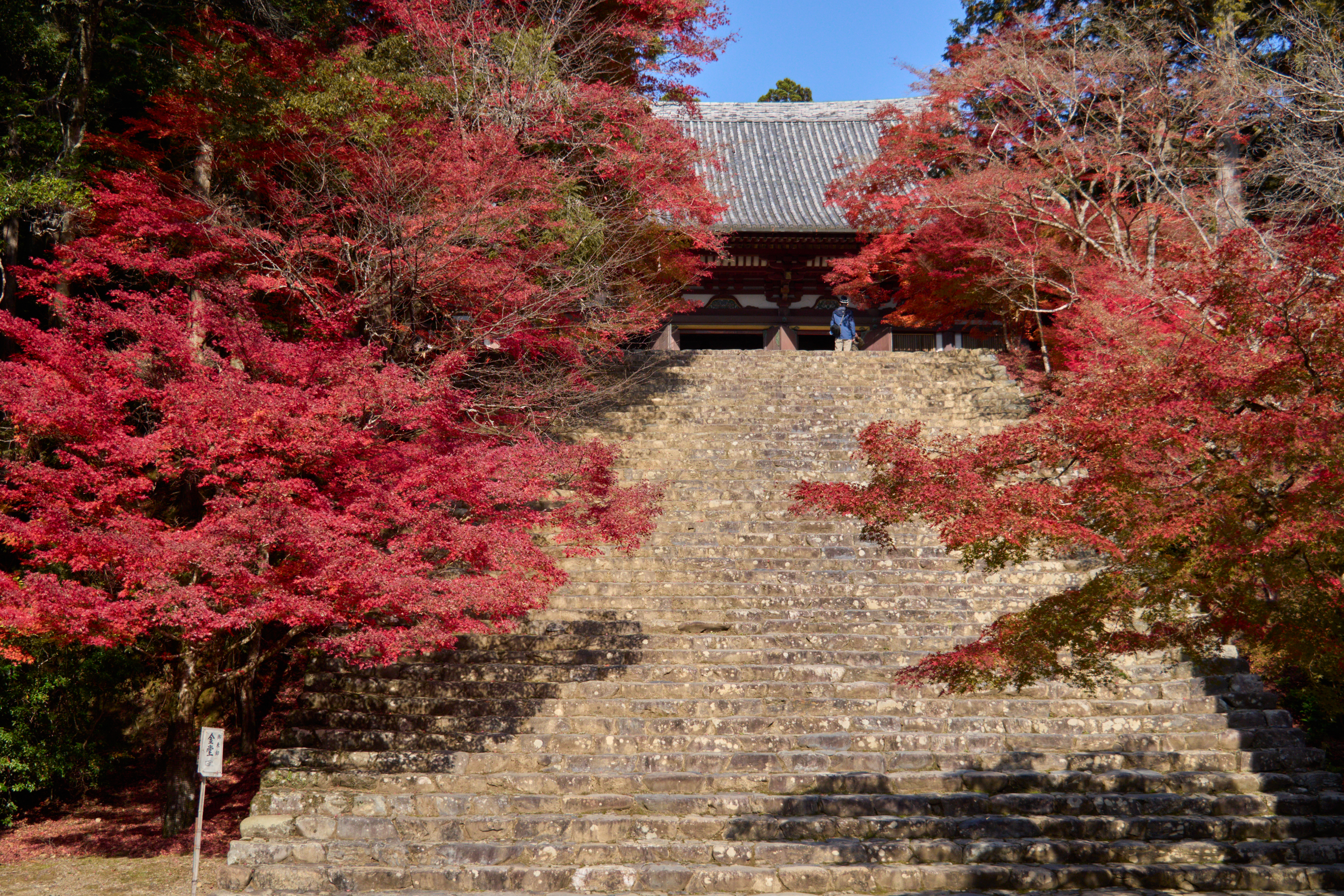
Stone stairway leading to Jingo-ji Kondō, flanked by Japanese maple trees in autumn foliage.

Jingo-ji (神護寺) is a Buddhist temple in Kyoto. It stands on Mount Takao to the northwest of the center of the city. The temple adheres to Shingon Buddhism. Its principal image is a statue of Bhaisajyaguru (Yakushi Nyorai), the Buddha of Healing or "Medicine Buddha".

The temple was first established in the year 824, as a merger of two private temples founded earlier by Wake no Kiyomaro. They were the Jingan-ji (神願寺) in Kiyomaro's home province and the Takaosan-ji (高雄山寺).

== Treasures ==
Jingo-ji holds sixteen National Treasures of Japan. They include the honzon and other statues. Another treasure is a list written by Kūkai in 812 called the "Name List of Abhisheka [Initiates]" (灌頂歴名, kanjōrekimyō) and displays some of Kukai's talent for calligraphy. This list contains people and deities in 812 who underwent the abhisheka at Takaosan-ji presided by Kūkai.

The Buddhist Sutra "Bimashōkyō", translated by Guṇabhadra, was handed down at the temple. It is "one of the a volume from the Issaikyō (a Buddhist corpus), commonly known as Jingo-ji kyō, the corpus originally consisted of more than 5,400 volumes in total, but only 2,317 still remain as the rest were scattered outside the temple."

== Buildings ==
Buildings at Jingo-ji have been destroyed by fire and war. Of the original buildings, only the Daishi-dō survived the Ōnin War; even the present Daishi-dō is of uncertain date. Itakura Katsushige, a daimyō and former Kyoto shoshidai in the Tokugawa shogunate, commissioned a major reconstruction in 1623. Another reconstruction took place in the 1930s with a contribution from Gendō Yamaguchi. Present structures include the following:

- Rōmon (1623)
- Kondō (金堂, 1934), housing the central image of Yakushi Nyorai, the Buddha of Healing.
- Bishamon-dō (1623)
- Godai-dō (五大堂, 1623), housing statues of Fudō Myōō and other wrathful deities.
- Bell tower (1623)
- Daishi-dō (大師堂, date unrecorded)
- Tahōtō (1934)

The temple is located above the Kiyotaki River (清滝川, kiyotakigawa), and has a special ceremonial well (閼伽井, akai) built on the grounds. Visitors can purchase tiny plates made of clay to throw out from the famous cliffs, the kin'unkei (錦雲渓), overlooking Kiyotaki River, with the hopes of one's plate hitting the river far below.

Buses from the center of the city arrive at a stop alongside the road. A long set of stairs leads down to the river, and a short bridge leads across it. A similar set of stairs leads up to the gate of the temple.

== See also ==
- Sanbi (三尾) - Jingo-ji, Kōzan-ji and Saimyō-ji
- List of National Treasures of Japan (ancient documents)
- List of National Treasures of Japan (paintings)
- List of National Treasures of Japan (sculptures)
- List of National Treasures of Japan (crafts-others)
