= Sagara, Shizuoka =

Sagara 相良町
- Former municipality
- Flag Seal

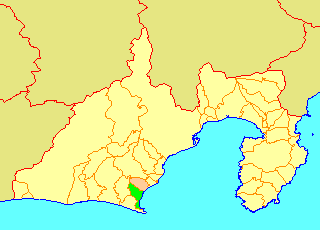
- Location of Sagara in Shizuoka Prefecture

- Location in Japan
- Coordinates: 34.6863°N 138.1987°E
- Country: Japan
- Region: Chūbu (Tōkai)
- Prefecture: Shizuoka Prefecture
- District: Haibara
- Merged: October 11, 2005 (now part of Makinohara)

Area
  - Total: 58.14 km^{2} (22.45 sq mi)

Population (April 1, 2005)
  - Total: 25,656
  - Density: 441/km^{2} (1,140/sq mi)
- Time zone: UTC+09:00 (JST)
- Symbols
- Flower: Narcissis
- Tree: Pine

Sagara (相良町, Sagara-chō) was a town located in Haibara District, Shizuoka Prefecture, Japan.

== Population ==
As of April 1, 2005, the town had an estimated population of 25,656 and a population density of 441 persons per km^{2}. The total area was 58.14 km^{2}.

== History ==
During the Edo period, Sagara was the center of Sagara Domain. It was incorporated as a town in 1889.

On October 11, 2005, Sagara, along with the town of Haibara (also from Haibara District), was merged to create the city of Makinohara, and thus no longer exists as an independent municipality.
