= Sagara Domain =

Coordinates: 34°41′12.5″N 138°11′53.5″E

Sagara Domain 相良藩
- under Tokugawa shogunate Japan
- 1710–1868
- Capital: Sagara jin'ya
- Area
  - Coordinates
  - Type: Daimyō
- Historical era: Edo period
  - Established: 1710
  - Disestablished: 1868
- Today part of: part of Shizuoka Prefecture

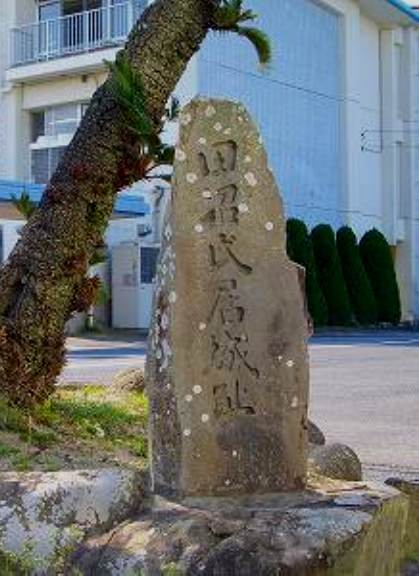
Monument marking site of Sagara Jin’ya, administrative center of Sagara Domain

Sagara Domain (相良藩, Sagara-han) was a Japanese feudal domain under the Tokugawa shogunate of Edo period, located in Tōtōmi Province. The domain was centered in what is now the Sagara district of Makinohara city, Shizuoka Prefecture. The site of the Sagara jin'ya is now the Sagara Elementary School.

== History ==
In 1710, Honda Tadaharu, lord of Ibo Domain in Mikawa Province was transferred by the Tokugawa shogunate to Sagara, on the coast of Tōtōmi Province and his revenues were raised from 10,000 koku to 15,000 koku. The Honda clan ruled Sagara for three generations, until Honda Tadayuki was transferred to Izumi Domain in Mutsu Province in 1746.

The Honda were replaced by Itakura Katsukiyo, who ruled for only three years before being transferred to Annaka Domain in Kōzuke Province. Sagara was then returned to the Honda clan in the form of Honda Tadanaka, formerly of Komoro Domain in Mikawa; however, it was reclassified as only a minor 10,000 koku domain at this time.

In 1767, Sagara Domain was awarded to Tanuma Okitsugu, who rose from very humble status as a page to Shōgun Tokugawa Ieshige, to chamberlain, and then grand-chamberlain and rōjū under Shōgun Tokugawa Ieharu. He was also elevated to the status of daimyō when he was awarded Sagara Domain, and over the years increased its revenues from 10,000 koku to 57,000 koku. Sagara prospered greatly under his economic reforms, and a road was built linking it to the great Tōkaidō highway connecting Edo with Kyoto. However, after Tokugawa Ieharu’s death Tanuma Okitsugu soon fell from favor, and reduced in rank and income. His grandson, Tanuma Okiaki, inherited a domain reduced back to its former 10,000 koku status in 1787, and less than a year later, was transferred to Shimomura Domain in Mutsu Province. Sagara Domain became a tenryō territory ruled directly by the Shōgun.

However, in 1823, his son Tanuma Ogimasa was allowed to return to Sagara, where he and his descendants remained until the Meiji Restoration. The domain had a population of 310 samurai at the start of the Meiji period. The domain maintained its primary residence (kamiyashiki) in Edo at Kanda, until the An'ei (1772–81) period, and at Hanjo at the time of the Meiji restoration.

In February 1869, the final daimyō of Sagara Domain, Tanuma Okitaka, was transferred by the new Meiji government to the short-lived Kokubo Domain in Kazusa Province and Sagara Domain was absorbed into the new Shizuoka Domain created for retired ex-Shōgun Tokugawa Yoshinobu.

== List of daimyōs ==
#	Name	Tenure	Courtesy title	Court Rank	kokudaka
Honda clan, 1710-1746 (fudai)
1	Honda Tadaharu (本多 忠晴)	1710–1715	Danjō-Shōhitsu (弾正少弼)	Junior 5th Rank, Lower Grade (従五位下)	15,000 koku
2	Honda Tadamichi (本多忠通)	1715–1721	Danjō-Shōhitsu (弾正少弼)	Junior 5th Rank, Lower Grade (従五位下)	15,000 koku
3	Honda Tadayuki (本多 忠如)	1721–1746	Etchu-no-kami (越中守)	Junior 5th Rank, Lower Grade (従五位下)	15,000 koku
Itakura clan 1746–1749 (fudai)
1	Itakura Katsukiyo (板倉 勝清)	1746–1749	Sado-no-kami (佐渡守); Jijū (侍従)	Junior 4th Rank, Lower Grade (従四位下)	20,000 koku
Honda clan 1749–1758 (fudai)
1	Honda Tadanaka (本多 忠央)	1749–1758	Nagato-no-kami (長門守)	Junior 5th Rank, Lower Grade (従五位下)	10,000 koku
Tanuma clan, 1772–1787 (fudai)
1	Tanuma Okitsugu (田沼 意次)	1767–1786	Tonomori-ryō (主殿寮); Jijū (侍従)	Junior 4th Rank, Lower Grade (従四位下)	10,000 – 57,000 – 10,000 koku
2	Tanuma Okiaki (田沼意明次)	1767–1786	Shimosuke-no-kami (下野守)	Junior 5th Rank, Lower Grade (従五位下)	10,000 koku
Tenryō 1786–1823
Tanuma clan 1823–1868 (fudai)
1	Tanuma Okimasa (田沼意正)	1823–1836	Genba-no-kami (玄蕃頭)	Junior 4th Rank, Lower Grade (従四位下)	10,000 koku
2	Tanuma Okitome (田沼意留)	1836–1840	Echizen-no-kami (備前守)	Junior 5th Rank, Lower Grade (従五位下)	10,000 koku
3	Tanuma Okitaka (田沼意尊)	1840–1868	Genba-no-kami (玄蕃頭)	Junior 5th Rank, Lower Grade (従五位下)	10,000 koku

== Holdings at the end of the Edo period ==
- Tōtōmi Province
  - 28 villages in Haibara District
  - 12 villages in Kitō District

== See also ==
- List of Han
