= Kakemono =

Japanese hanging scrolls

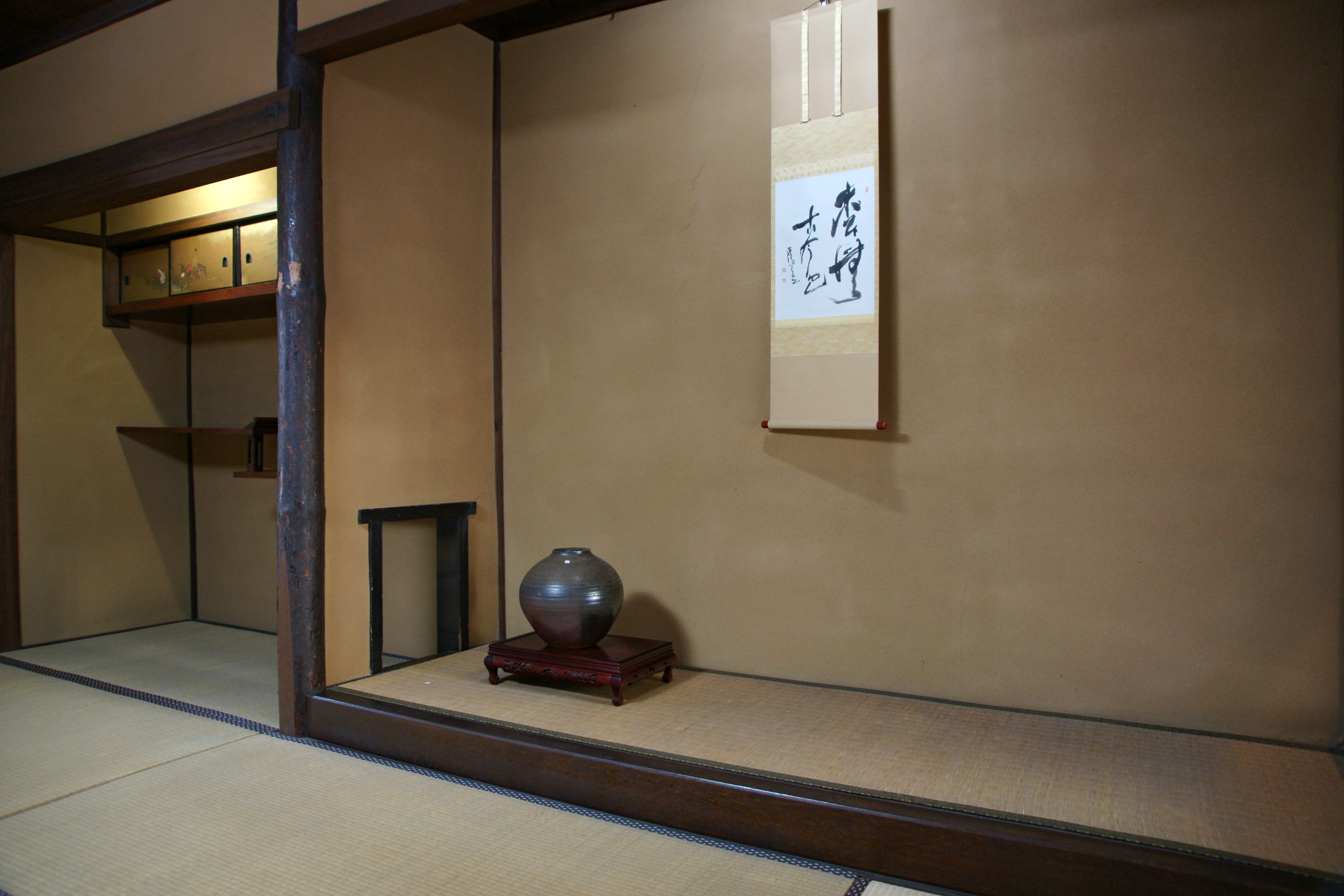
Kakemono at the Tatsuno Municipal Murotsu Museum of Folklore in Murotsu, Tatsuno, Hyōgo Prefecture, Japan

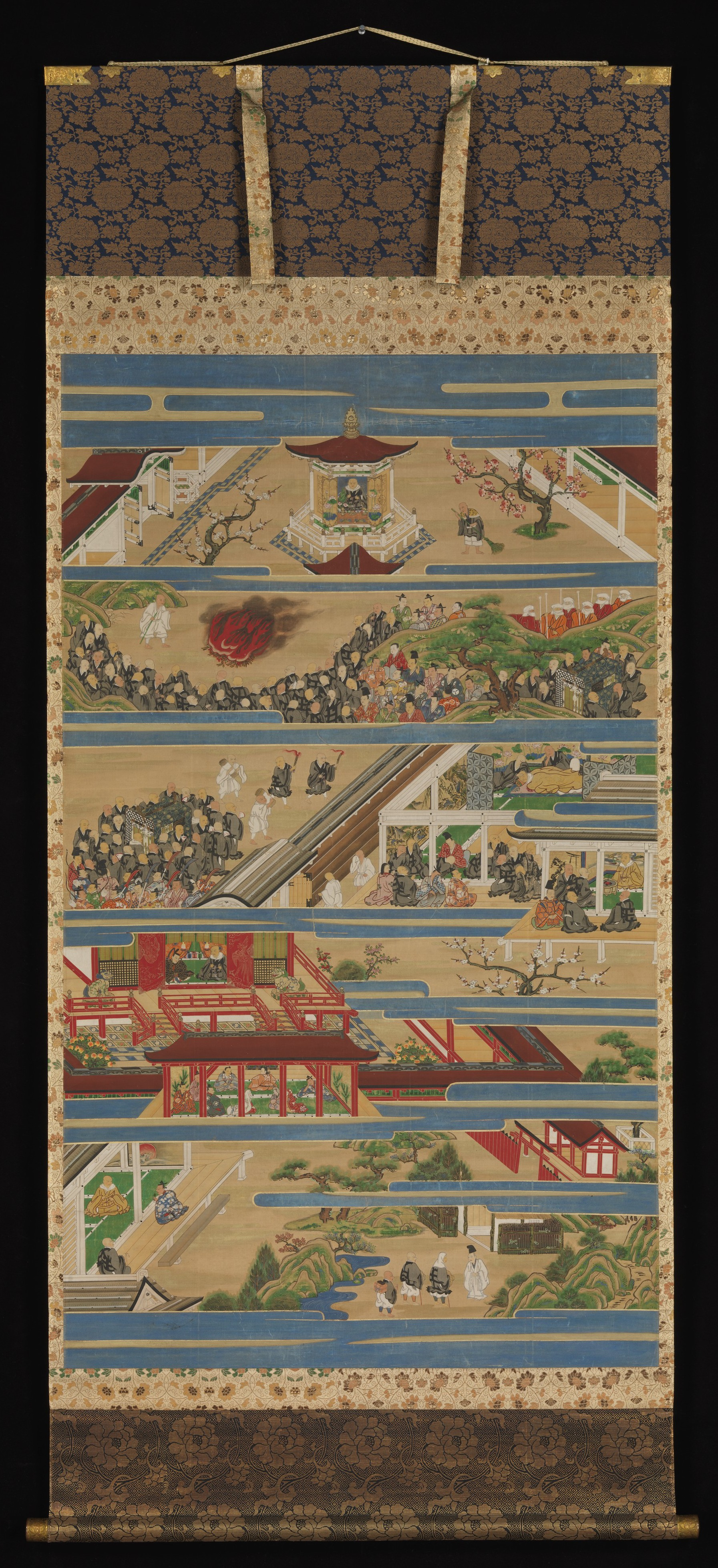
A kakejiku showing the illustrated life of Shinran, founder of the Pure Land Buddhist Jōdo Shinshū school

A kakemono (掛物; "hanging thing"), more commonly referred to as a kakejiku (掛軸; "hung scroll"), is a Japanese hanging scroll used to display and exhibit paintings and calligraphy inscriptions and designs mounted usually with silk fabric edges on a flexible backing, so that it can be rolled for storage. The origin is said to date back to the Nara period (710-794).

Buddhist kakejikus, which often depict buddhas, bodhisattvas and religious founders like Bodhidharma, are also referred to by various names like Butsuji-gake (仏事掛け) or Butsuga (仏画). Furthermore, if the scroll serves as the main object of worship on an altar., it may be referred to by terms like Meimyō, Jōmyō and Gohonzon (本尊).

The "Maruhyōsō" style of kakejiku has four distinct named sections. The top section is called the ten, 'heaven'. The bottom is the chi, 'earth', with the hashira pillars supporting the heaven and earth on the sides. The maruhyōsō style also contains a section of ichimonji made from kinran, gold thread. On observation, the ten is longer than the chi. This is because in the past, kakemono were viewed from a kneeling (seiza) position and this provided perspective to the honshi, main work. This tradition carries on to modern times.

There is a cylindrical rod called jikugi (軸木) at the bottom, which becomes the axis or center of the rolled scroll. The end knobs on this rod are in themselves called jiku, and are used as grasps when rolling and unrolling the scroll.

Other parts of the scroll include the jikubo referenced above as the jikugi. The top half moon-shaped wood rod is named the hassō to which the kan or metal loops are inserted in order to tie the kakehimo, hanging thread. Attached to the jikubo are the jikusaki, the term used for the end knobs, which can be inexpensive and made of plastic or relatively decorative pieces made of ceramic or lacquered wood. Additional decorative wood or ceramic pieces are called fuchin and come with multicolored tassels. The variation in the kakehimo, jikusaki and fuchin make each scroll original and unique.

The arrival of kakemono to the Spanish colonies in the Philippines and the Americas prompted local artists to imitate the format as a convenient way to provide portable art.

== See also ==
- History of scrolls
- Japanese painting
