= Tanuma Okitsugu =

Japanese political advisor, rōjū (1719–1788)

Junior Fourth Rank, Lower Grade Tanuma Okitsugu
- 田沼 意次
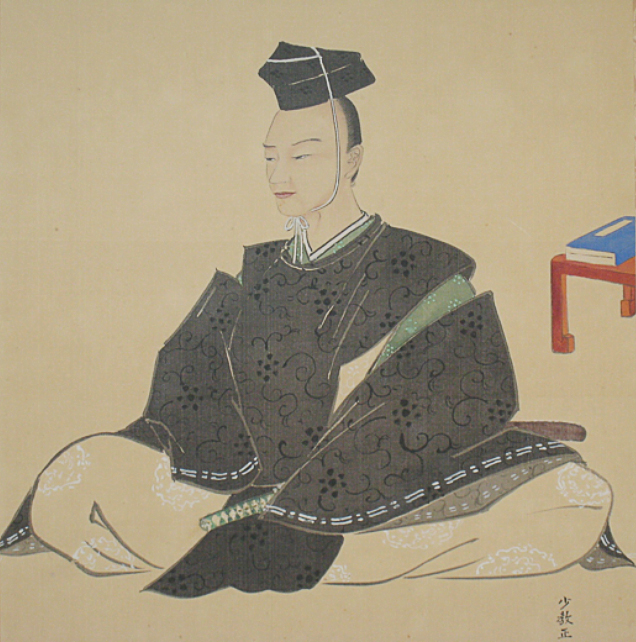
- Tanuma Okitsugu

Lord of Sagara
- In office 1767–1786
- Preceded by: Honda Tadanaka
- Succeeded by: Tanuma Okiaki

Personal details
- Born: September 11, 1719 Edo, Japan
- Died: August 25, 1788 (aged 68) Edo, Japan

Tanuma Okitsugu (田沼 意次) (September 11, 1719 – August 25, 1788) was a chamberlain (sobashū) and a senior counselor (rōjū) to the shōgun Tokugawa Ieharu of the Tokugawa Shogunate, in the Edo period of Japan. Tanuma and his son exercised tremendous power, especially in the last 14 years of shogun Ieharu's reign. He is known for the economic reforms of the Tenmei era and rampant corruption. He was also a daimyō of the Sagara Domain. Tanuma used the title Tonomo-no-kami.

Tanuma's reforms aimed to rectify the systemic problems in Japan's economy, particularly the trade imbalance between the provinces (han) and the shogunal areas (tenryō) of Japan. The previous shogun, Tokugawa Yoshimune, sought to rectify the shogunate's economic problems by frugality and a focus on agriculture. Instead, Tanuma debased currency, sold monopoly rights to dealers, and taxed merchant guilds. To stem unfavorable balances of trade and bullion outflow, he took steps to increase foreign exports and set export quotas for Akita copper mines (copper being the primary coinage metal during that period), despite higher domestic prices. Tanuma's administration granted monopoly patents for numerous products, including iron, brass, sulfur, ginseng and lamp oil. Large investments were made into the massive drainage program to increase the agricultural land.

Despite Tanuma's intentions to serve the public good, he was deeply corrupt and exacerbated corruption in government. Several years of crop failures from 1783 to 1787, resulting from drought followed by floods, led to famine and frequent riots.

In Tenmei 4 (1784), Okitsugu's son, the wakadoshiyori (junior counselor) Tanuma Okitomo, was assassinated inside Edo Castle. Okitomo was killed in front of his father as both were returning to their norimono after a meeting of the Counselors of State had broken up. Okitomo was killed by Sano Masakoto, a hatamoto. The involvement of senior figures in the bakufu was suspected, but only the assassin himself was punished.

The famine led to a spike in a number of protests and peasant rebellions, culminating in the Edo riots of 1787. Traditionalist opponents of the reform interpreted it as the "voice of Heaven" being followed by the "voice of the people". With the assassination of his son and the death of his patron Tokugawa Ieharu, Tanuma fell from power. The result was that the reforms and the relaxation of the strictures of sakoku were blocked.

== Notes ==
Preceded by Honda Tadanaka	Daimyō of Sagara; 1767–1786	Succeeded by Tanuma Okiaki

== See also ==
- Tenmei
- Kuze Hirotami
- Matsudaira Sadanobu
