= Makinohara =

Makinohara 牧之原市
- City
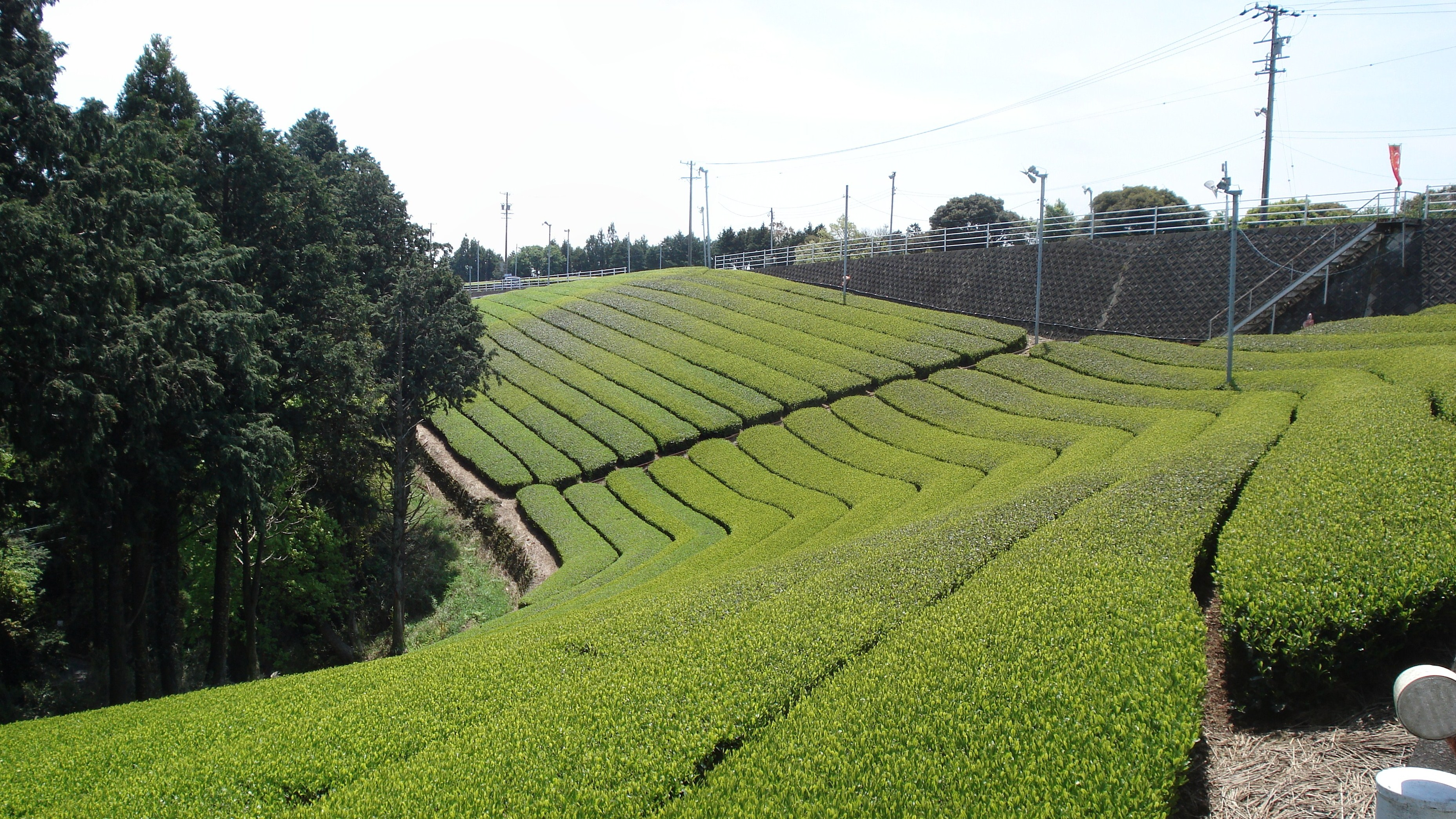
- Tea plantations in Makinohara

- Flag Seal

- Location of Makinohara in Shizuoka Prefecture

- Coordinates: 34°44′N 138°13′E
- Country: Japan
- Region: Chūbu (Tōkai)
- Prefecture: Shizuoka
- First official recorded: 6 BC
- Sagara Town settled: April 1, 1889
- Haibara Town settled: April 1, 1955
- Both town merged and city settled: October 11, 2005

Government
  - Mayor: Kikuo Sugimoto (from October 2017)

Area
  - Total: 111.69 km^{2} (43.12 sq mi)

Population (December 31, 2025)
  - Total: 42,326
  - Density: 378.96/km^{2} (981.50/sq mi)
- Time zone: UTC+9 (Japan Standard Time)
- Phone number: 548-23-0001
- Address: 447 Shizunami, Makinohara-shi, Shizuoka-ken 421-0495
- Climate: Cfa
- Website: Official website
- Symbols
- Flower: hydrangea
- Tree: camellia sinensis

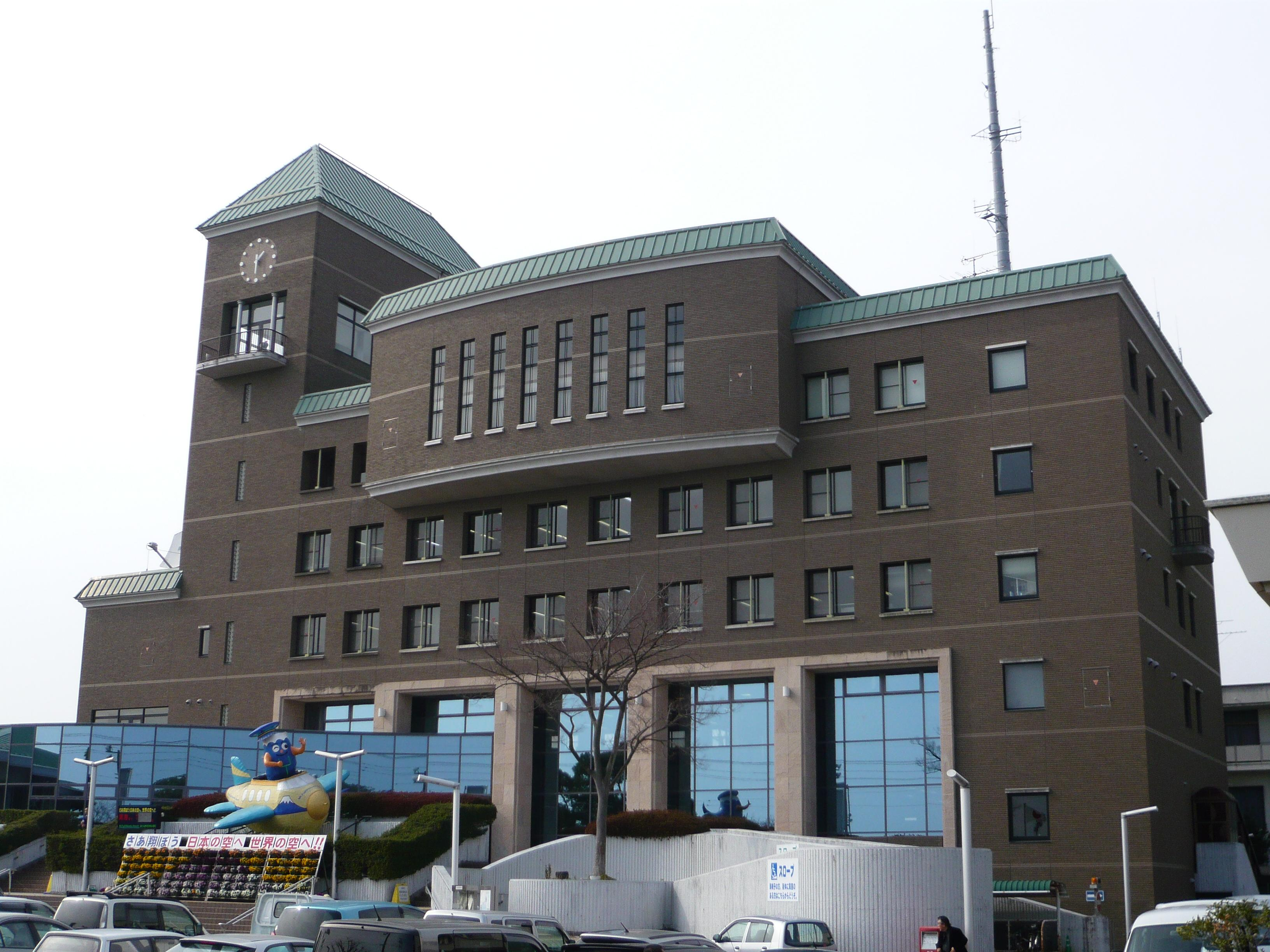
Makinohara City Hall Haibara Office

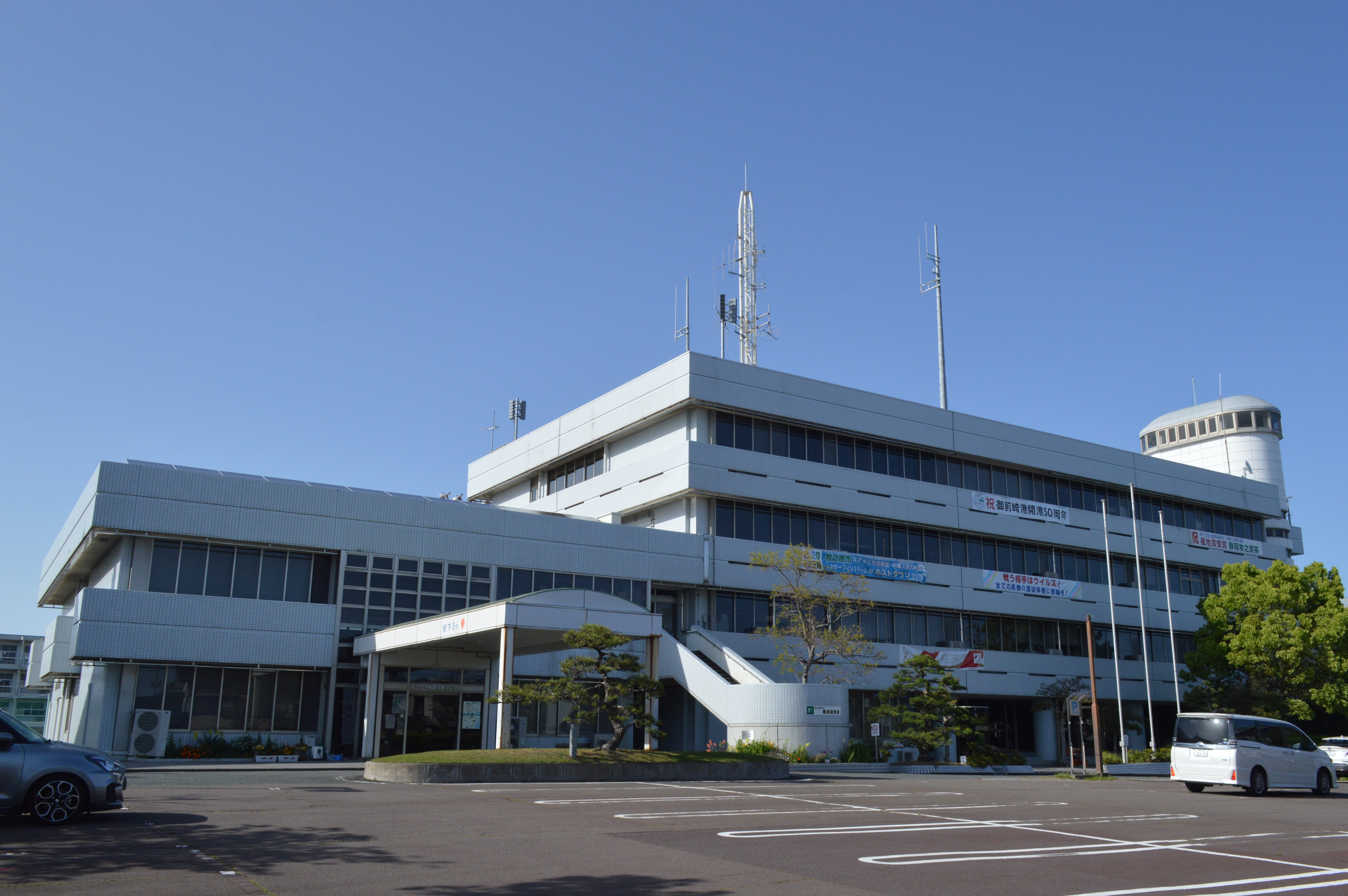
Makinohara City Hall Sagara Office

Makinohara (牧之原市, Makinohara-shi) is a city located in western Shizuoka Prefecture, Japan. As of 31 December 2025, the city had an estimated population of 42,326 in 17420 households and a population density of 379 persons per km^{2}. The total area of the city was 111.69 square kilometres (43.12 sq mi).

== Geography ==
Makinohara is located in south-central Shizuoka Prefecture. It is bordered by Suruga Bay on the Pacific Ocean to the east, and rises gradually to the Makinohara Plateau, famous for its tea production, in the west. The main residential areas are along the coast, and the population of the Makinohara Plateau accounts for about 10% of the city's total population. The area has a temperate maritime climate, characterized by hot, humid summers and mild winters, with the warm Kuroshio Current off shore providing a moderating effect.

=== Surrounding municipalities ===
Shizuoka Prefecture

- Kikugawa
- Omaezaki
- Shimada
- Yoshida, Haibara District

=== Demographics ===
Per Japanese census data, the population of Makinohara has been relatively steady over the past 50 years.

Historical population
Year	Pop.	±%
1940	44,565	—
1950	55,066	+23.6%
1960	50,993	−7.4%
1970	47,953	−6.0%
1980	48,835	+1.8%
1990	51,308	+5.1%
2000	51,672	+0.7%
2010	49,022	−5.1%

=== Climate ===
The city has a climate characterized by hot and humid summers, and relatively mild winters (Köppen climate classification Cfa). The average annual temperature in Makinohara is 16.0 °C (60.8 °F). The average annual rainfall is 2,269.4 mm (89.35 in) with July as the wettest month. The temperatures are highest on average in August, at around 26.6 °C (79.9 °F), and lowest in January, at around 5.6 °C (42.1 °F).

Climate data for Shizuoka Airport, Makinohara (2009−2020 normals, extremes 2009−present)
Month	Jan	Feb	Mar	Apr	May	Jun	Jul	Aug	Sep	Oct	Nov	Dec	Year
Record high °C (°F)	18.8 (65.8)	24.0 (75.2)	26.5 (79.7)	28.2 (82.8)	30.6 (87.1)	33.9 (93.0)	37.4 (99.3)	36.8 (98.2)	36.2 (97.2)	31.5 (88.7)	25.5 (77.9)	22.0 (71.6)	37.4 (99.3)
Mean daily maximum °C (°F)	10.5 (50.9)	11.5 (52.7)	14.8 (58.6)	18.6 (65.5)	23.1 (73.6)	25.4 (77.7)	29.0 (84.2)	30.8 (87.4)	27.3 (81.1)	22.6 (72.7)	17.8 (64.0)	12.6 (54.7)	20.3 (68.6)
Daily mean °C (°F)	5.6 (42.1)	6.7 (44.1)	9.9 (49.8)	13.9 (57.0)	18.5 (65.3)	21.5 (70.7)	25.2 (77.4)	26.6 (79.9)	23.4 (74.1)	18.6 (65.5)	13.4 (56.1)	8.1 (46.6)	16.0 (60.7)
Mean daily minimum °C (°F)	1.7 (35.1)	2.6 (36.7)	5.5 (41.9)	9.7 (49.5)	14.5 (58.1)	18.4 (65.1)	22.4 (72.3)	23.7 (74.7)	20.3 (68.5)	15.4 (59.7)	9.8 (49.6)	4.3 (39.7)	12.4 (54.2)
Record low °C (°F)	−4.6 (23.7)	−5.0 (23.0)	−1.8 (28.8)	1.1 (34.0)	6.2 (43.2)	11.6 (52.9)	17.4 (63.3)	18.2 (64.8)	14.5 (58.1)	8.1 (46.6)	1.3 (34.3)	−3.0 (26.6)	−5.0 (23.0)
Average precipitation mm (inches)	56.4 (2.22)	126.6 (4.98)	181.5 (7.15)	240.3 (9.46)	210.5 (8.29)	262.8 (10.35)	292.0 (11.50)	156.3 (6.15)	261.0 (10.28)	264.6 (10.42)	121.1 (4.77)	83.3 (3.28)	2,269.4 (89.35)
Average precipitation days (≥ 1.0 mm)	4.1	6.7	9.4	10.1	8.7	12.3	12.3	9.3	11.4	9.6	7.1	5.9	106.9
Source: Japan Meteorological Agency

== History ==
The area of present-day Makinohara was part of former Tōtōmi Province. During the Edo period, the town of Sagara was the castle town of Sagara Domain. With the establishment of the modern municipalities system in the early Meiji period on April 1, 1889, Sagara was incorporated as a town within Haibara District.

The city of Makinohara was established on October 11, 2005, from the merger of the towns of Haibara and Sagara (both from Haibara District).

== Government ==
Makinohara has a mayor-council form of government with a directly elected mayor and a unicameral city legislature of 16 members. The city contributes one member to the Shizuoka Prefectural Assembly. In terms of national politics, the city is part of the Shizuoka 2nd district of the lower house of the Diet of Japan.

== Economy ==
The local economy of Makinohara is dominated by the production of green tea, and to a lesser extent by commercial fishing, and manufacturing of automobile components for Suzuki Motors (Sagara Plant). Almost the entire city is within a 20 kilometer radius of the Chubu Electric Power Hamaoka Nuclear Power Plant and receives subsidies from the government due to the increased risk.

Fuji Dream Airlines has its headquarters in Makinohara.

== Education ==
Makinohara has seven public elementary schools operated by the city government and one shared between Makinohara and Kikugawa, and three shared between Makinohara and Omaezaki. The city likewise operates two public junior high schools and shares operated with one junior high school with Kikugawa and one with Omaezaki. The city has two public high schools operated by the Shizuoka Prefectural Board of Education.

== Transportation ==
=== Railway ===
Although both the Tokaido Shinkansen and the Tokaido Main Line pass through Makinohara, the city has no passenger railway services. The nearest train station is Kikugawa Station in neighboring Kikugawa or Kanaya Station in neighboring Shimada.

=== Highway ===
- Tōmei Expressway - Makinohara Interchange
- National Route 150
- National Route 473

=== Airport ===
Shizuoka Airport, which opened in 2009, straddles the border between Makinohara and Shimada.

== Local attractions ==
- Sagara Oil field, Japan's only oil field on the Pacific coast. Hand-pumping began in 1873, and the following year, Nippon Oil opened the first mechanical pumping operation in the country at Sagara. Operations ceased in 1955, and in 1980 the field was made into the "Yuden no Sato" Park, operated by the Shizuoka Prefectural government.
- Sagara Castle ruins
- Heiden-ji

== Sister cities ==
- Hitoyoshi, Kumamoto, Japan
- Kelso, Washington, United States
- Matsukawa, Nagano (Shimoina), Japan
- Sannohe, Aomori, Japan

== Notable people from Makinohara ==
- Takuma Edamura, professional soccer player
- Hideji Katō, professional baseball player
- Umetaro Suzuki, scientist, pioneer in vitamin research
- Kazuo Ueda, economist, the 32nd Governor of the Bank of Japan
