= Naganao =

- Gender: Male

Origin
- Origin: Japanese
- Meaning: Different meanings depending on the kanji used

Naganao (written: 長直) is a masculine Japanese given name. Notable people with the name include:

- Asano Naganao (浅野 長直) (1610–1672), Japanese daimyō
- Mori Naganao (森 長直) (1672–1722), Japanese daimyō
