= Akō Castle =

Castle in Hyōgo, Japan

- 赤穂城
- Akō, Hyōgo Prefecture, Japan
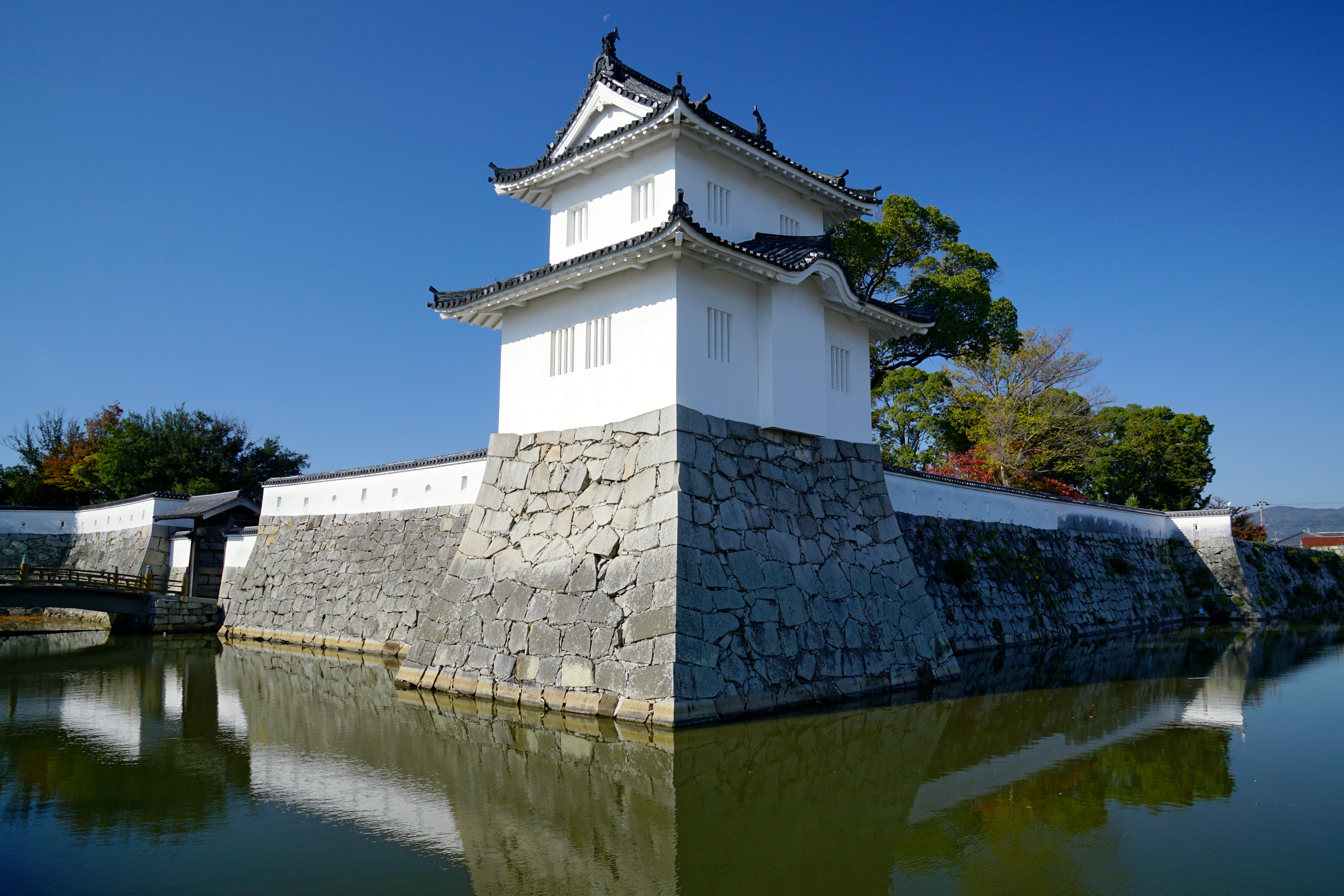
- Akō Castle reconstructed Yagura

Site information
- Type: flatland-style castle
- Owner: Bessho clan
- Condition: partial reconstruction

Location
- Akō Castle Akō Castle (Japan)
- Coordinates: 34°44′44.41″N 134°23′20.34″E

Site history
- Built: 1615
- Built by: Asano Naganao
- Demolished: 1873

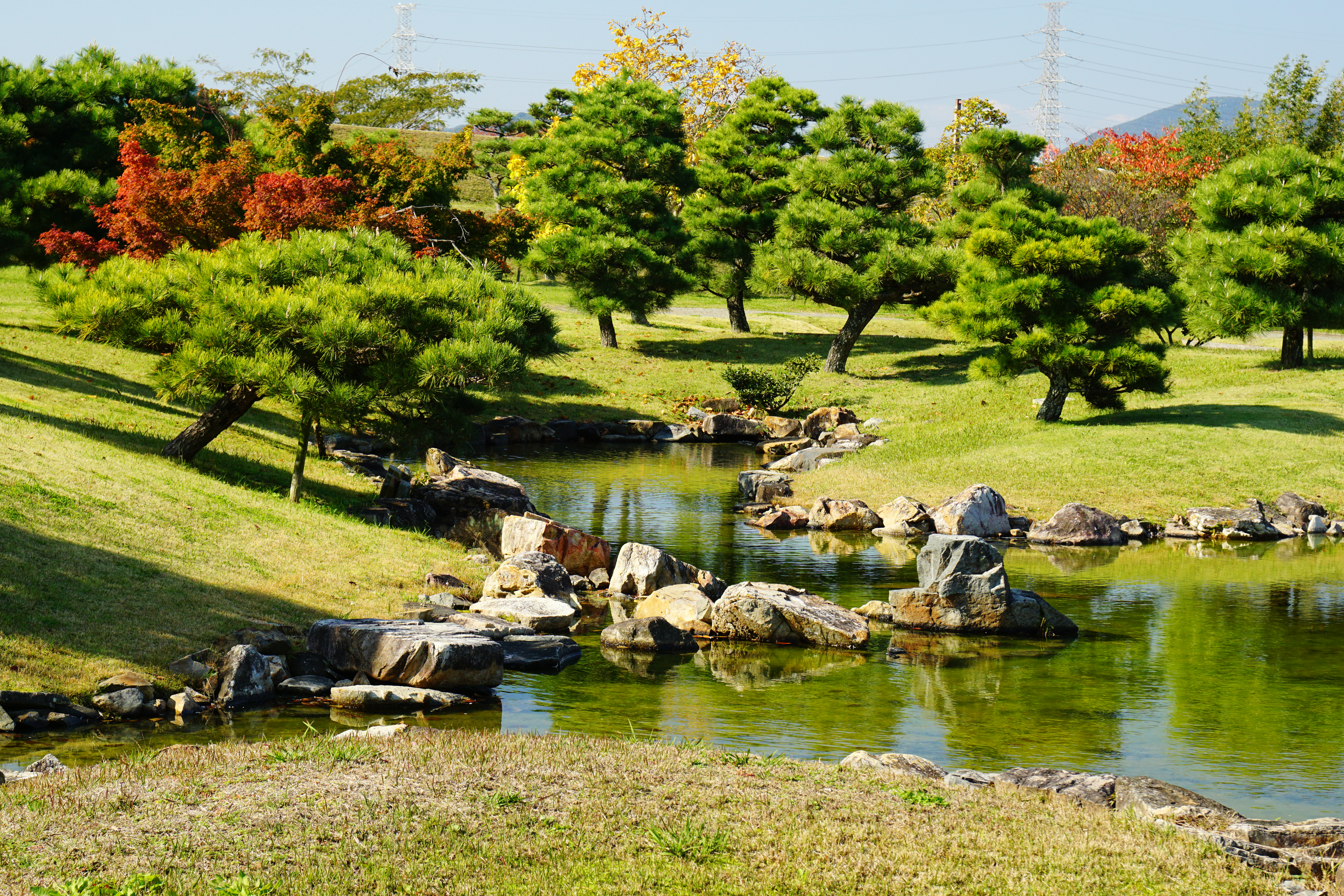
Honmaru Garden

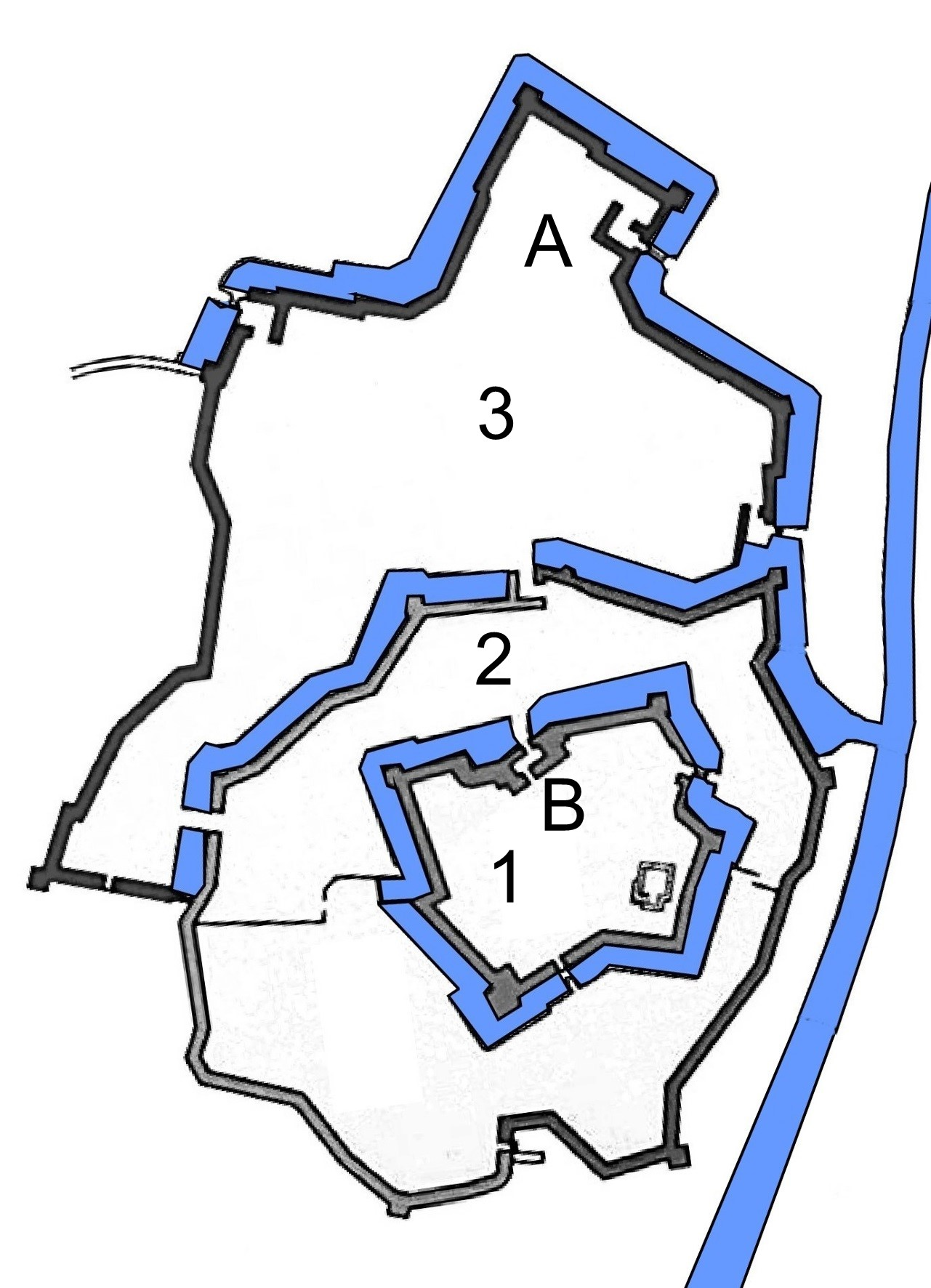
Layout

Akō Castle (赤穂城, Akō-jō) is a former flatland Japanese castle located in the city of Akō, Hyōgo Prefecture, Japan. Built by the Asano clan in the Edo period, it was the center of Akō Domain in western Harima Province. Demolished in 1873 by the Meiji government, the castle was designated a National Historic Site in 1971, with the area under protection expanded in 2003. Within the castle grounds is the Nagayamon gate to the residence of Ōishi Kuranosuke, the karō of the domain under Asano Naganori. The house itself no longer exists, but its location has a separate National Historic Site designation. Both the Honmaru Garden and the Ni-no-Maru Gardens have been restored to an approximation of their appearance in the Edo period, and are collectively designated a National Place of Scenic Beauty in 2021.

== Overview ==
Akō Castle is located on the southern seashore of Akō city, and guarded the border between former Harima Province and Bizen Province. It was originally a small fortification erected by the local Oka clan in the 15th century. However, after the area was awarded to Tokugawa Ieyasu's general and son-in-law Ikeda Terumasa after the Battle of Sekigahara, and a new castle was constructed. The Ikeda clan ruled from Himeji Castle, and Akō Castle was constructed as a secondary fortification to secure the domain's western borders. Ikeda Terumasa's vast holdings were broken up after his death, and his fifth son, Ikeda Masatsuna, received a 35,000 koku portion which had been assigned as the widow's portion to his mother Tokuhime. His younger brother, Ikeda Teruoki, inherited the domain in 1631. However, he went insane in 1645, murdering his concubine and several ladies-in-waiting, and was dispossessed. The Ikeda were replaced by a cadet branch of the Asano clan. Asano Naganao spend 13 years rebuilding Akō Castle on a scale far in excess of his kokudaka of 53,000 koku and also reconstructed the castle town. The castle had 12 gates and 10 yagura towers. The design of the castle was unusual in that it consisted of concentric moated enclosure each shaped in a geometric pattern, which may have been influenced by knowledge of Western star fort designs. The stone foundation base of a five-story tenshu was constructed, but it remained only as a foundation, and no tenshu was ever actually constructed. Although it is now far from the coastline, at the time of its construction it was built on the seashore, and it was possible to sail from docks located in the castle.

The Asano clan were dispossessed following the famous forty-seven rōnin incident, and the castle passed into the hands of the Mori clan who ruled over a much reduced Akō Domain from 1706 until the Meiji restoration.

== Current situation ==
Subsequent to Meiji Restoration outer areas and most buildings were lost due to the 1873 Abolition of Castles Ordinance by the Meiji government. Many of the buildings were pulled down, and portions of the stone walls were demolished to be used as a revetment when the Chikusa River flooded in 1892. Many of the moats were filled in, and the site of the Honmaru central enclosure became a school in 1928. A portion of moats and one yagura were reconstructed in 1935 and more moats in 1953. Subsequently, several buildings and structures of the inner area have been restored, including the Otemon main gate in 1955. The school was relocated in 1981, ten years after the site received National Historic Site designation. From the 1990s, reconstruction of the Honmaru garden began. Several more gates were restored by 1996. In 2006 Akō Castle was selected as one of Japan's Top 100 Castles by the Japan Castle Association.

== Oishi Shrine ==
Oishi Shrine
- 大石神社
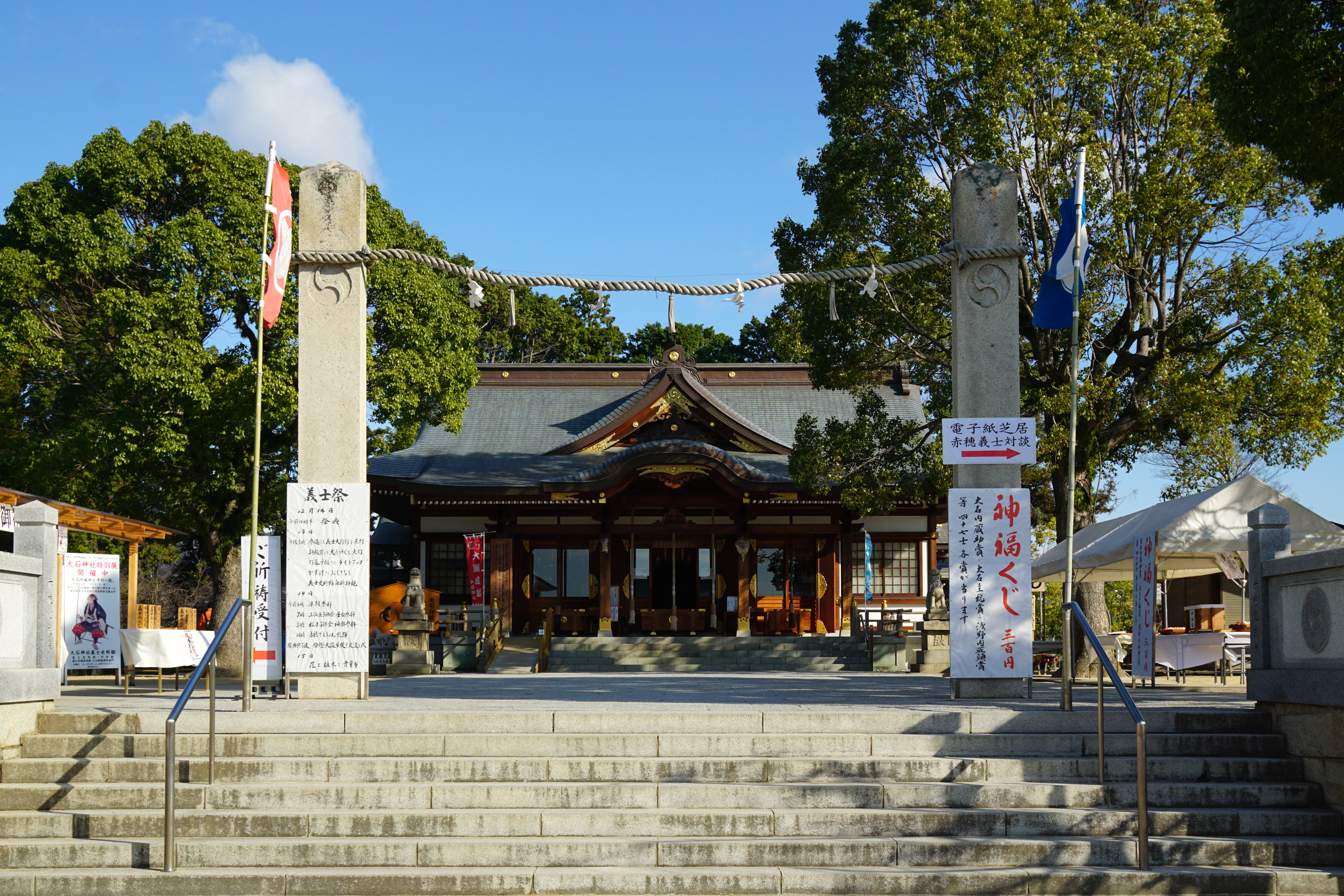

Religion
- Affiliation: Shinto
- Interactive map of Oishi Shrine

Oishi Shrine is a Shinto shrine located in Japan. Dedicated to the forty-seven rōnin. It is a Beppyo shrine, or a shrine that is particularly notable in a certain way with a significant history to it. IT is located in the ruins of Akō Castle.

== Gallery ==
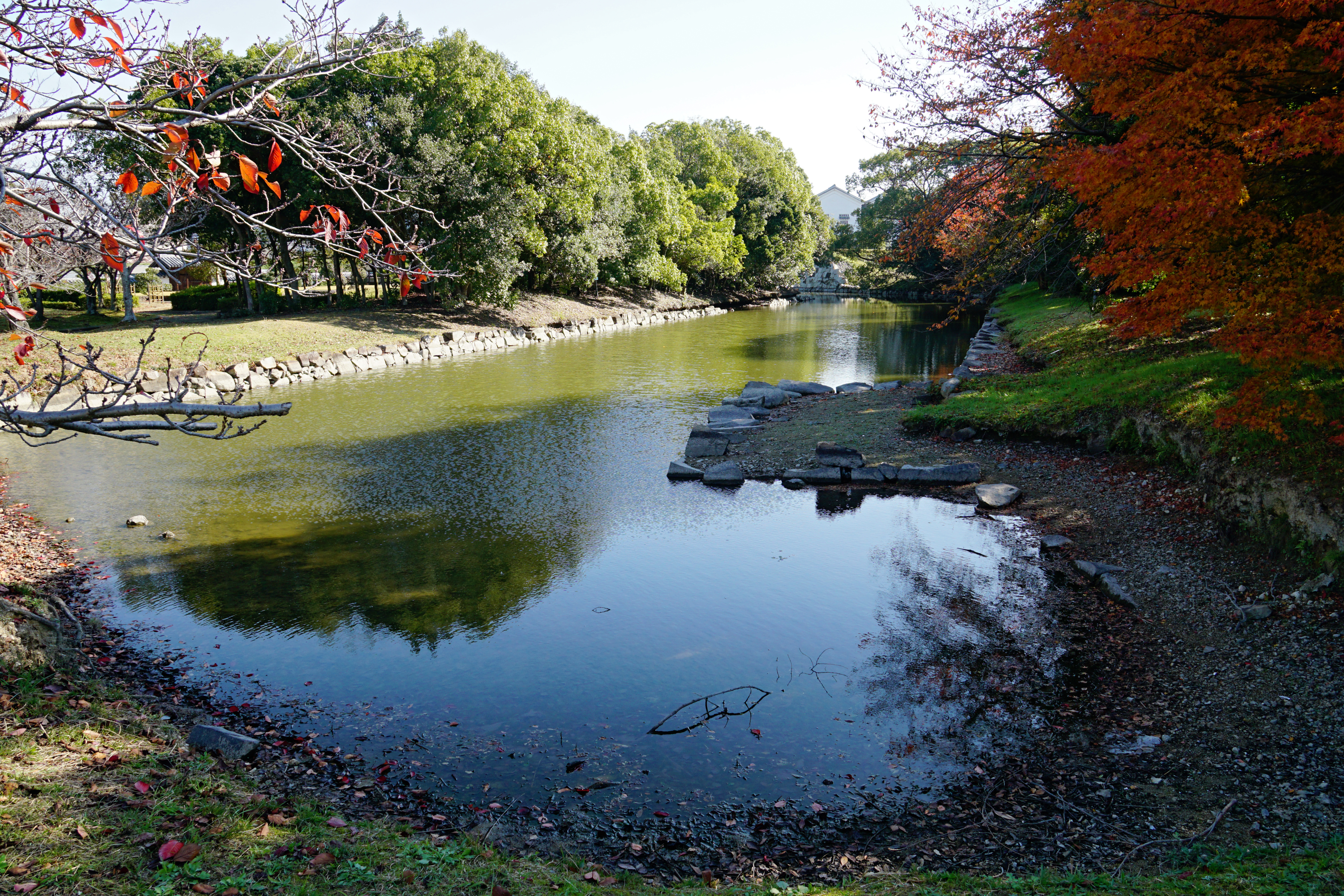
Site of the Ni-no-Maru Gate

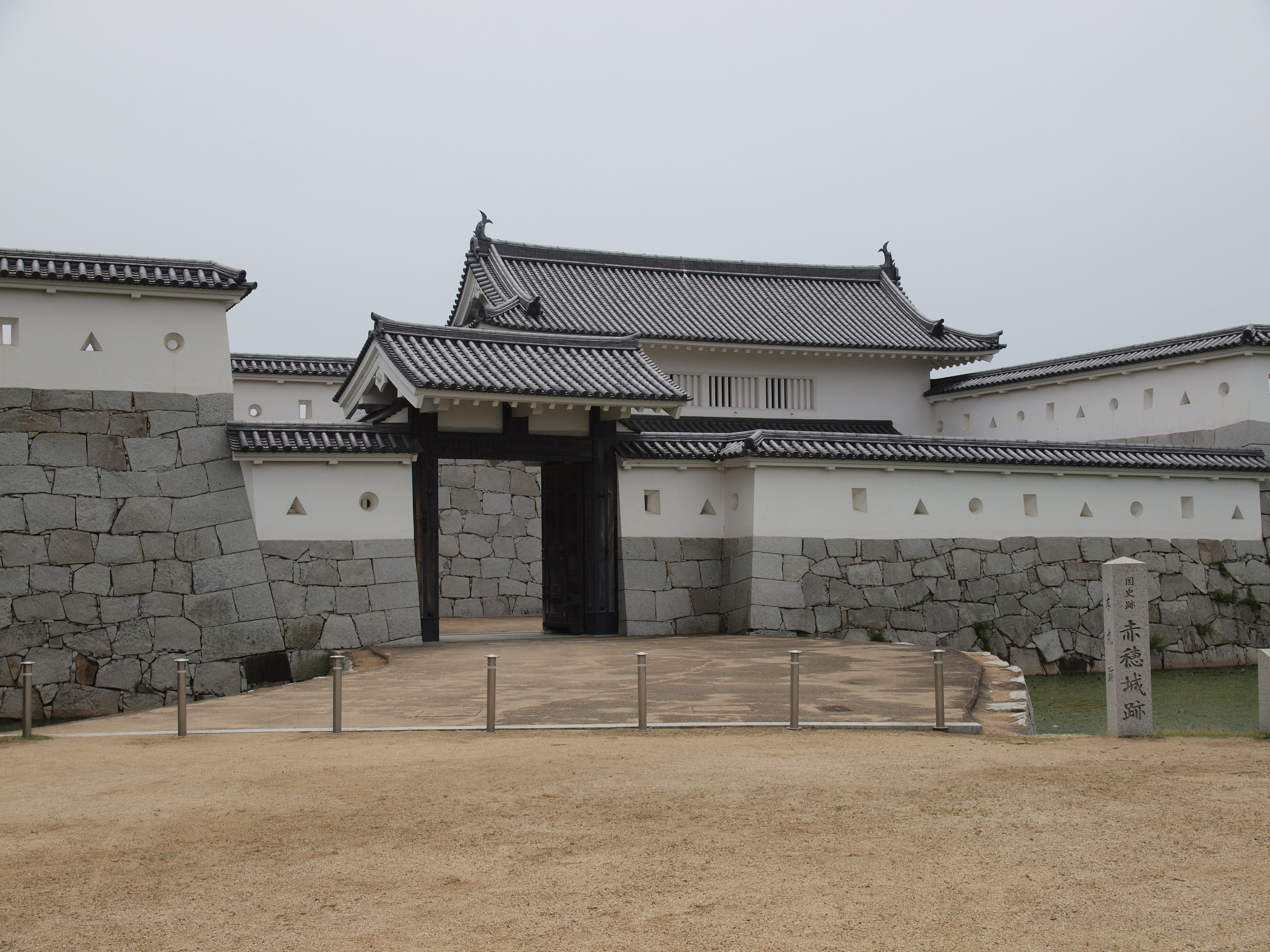
Honmaru rear gate (restored)

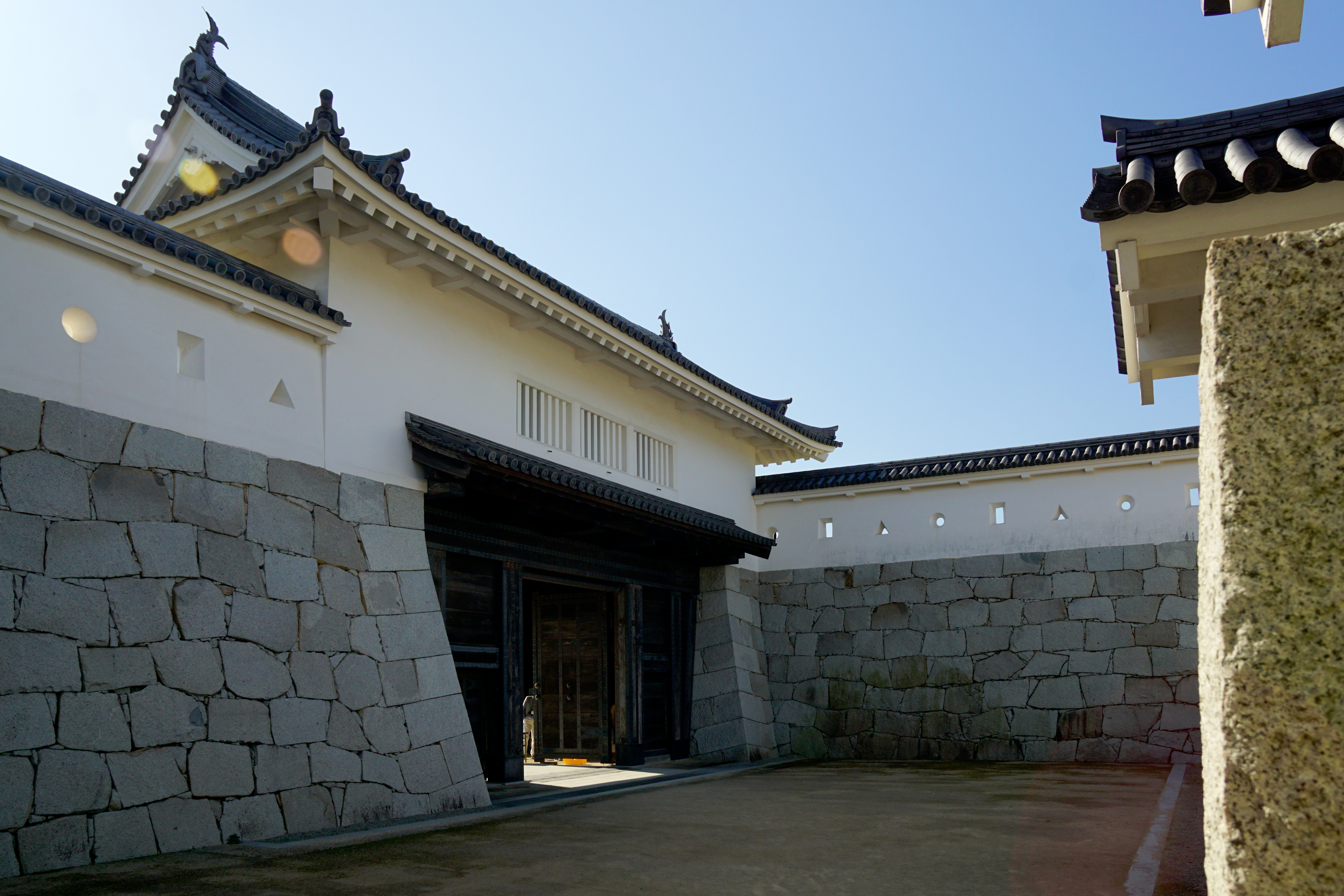
Masugata-style Honmaru rear gate

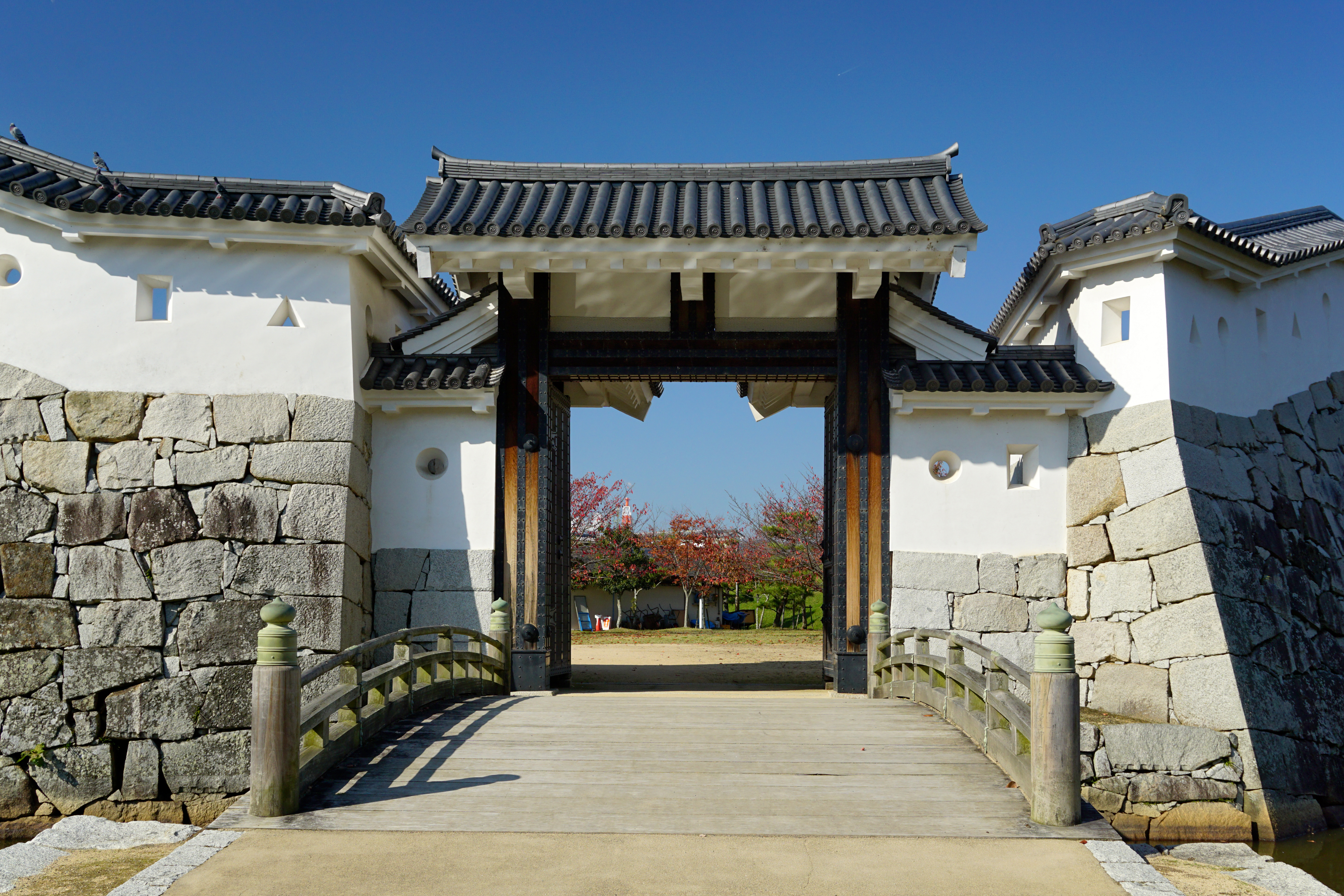
Honmaru Stable Gate

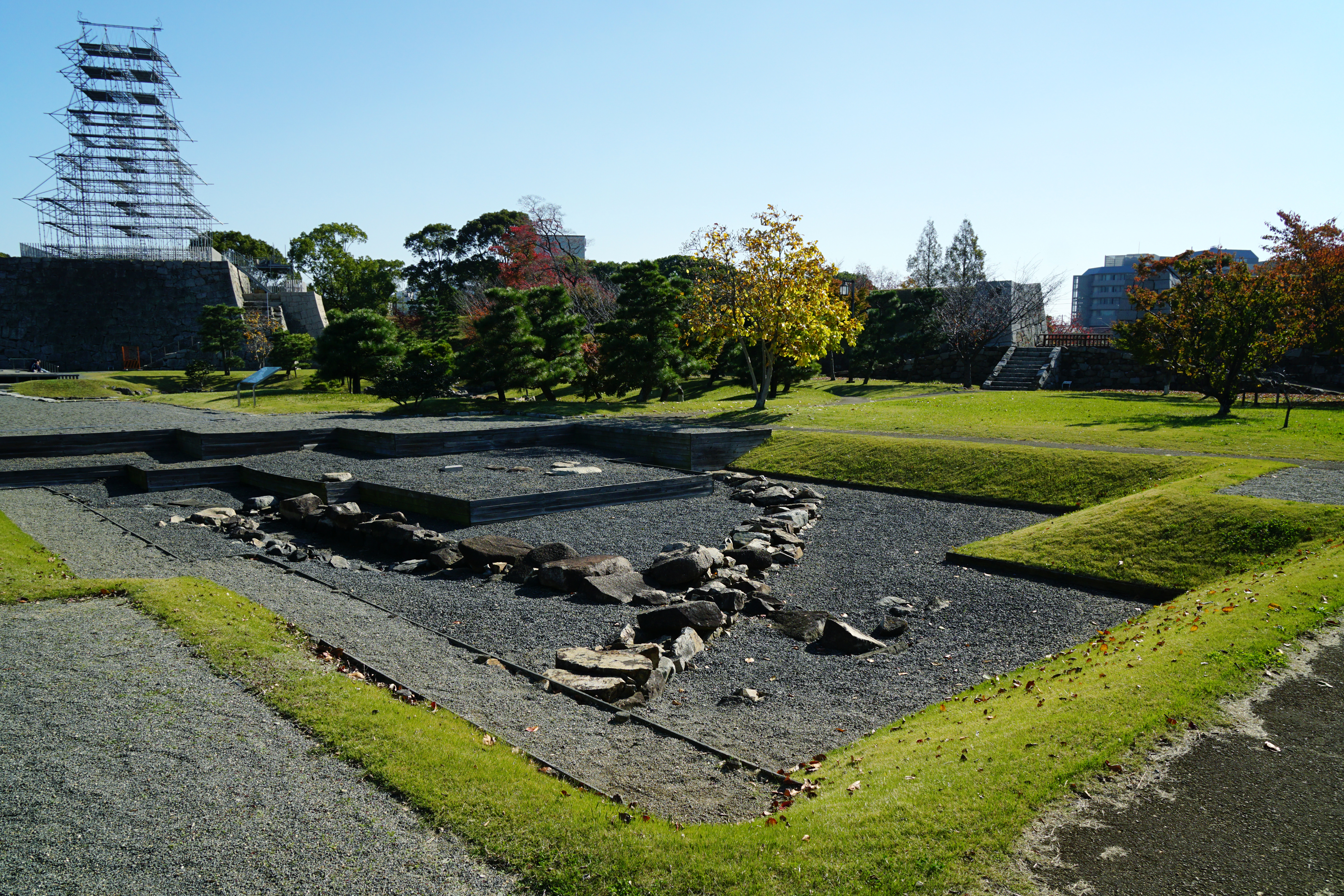
Foundations of the Honmaru Palace

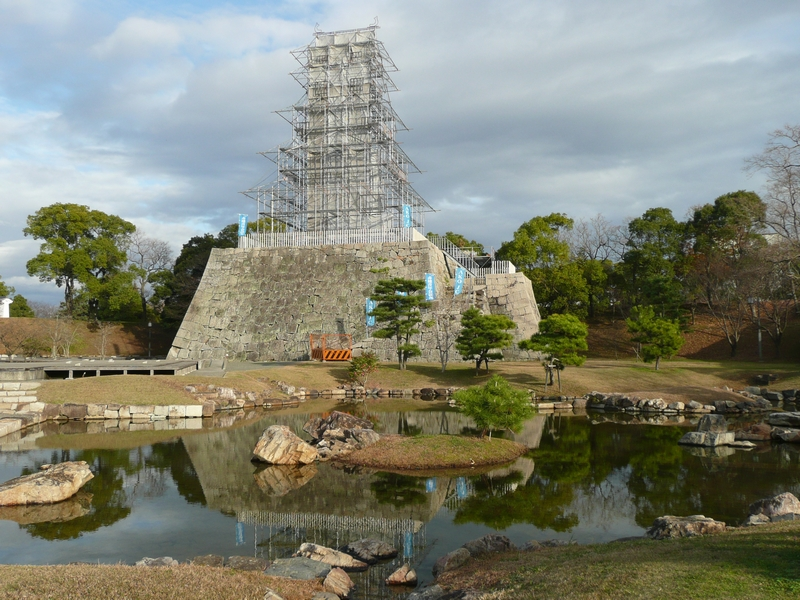
Foundation base of the Tenshu

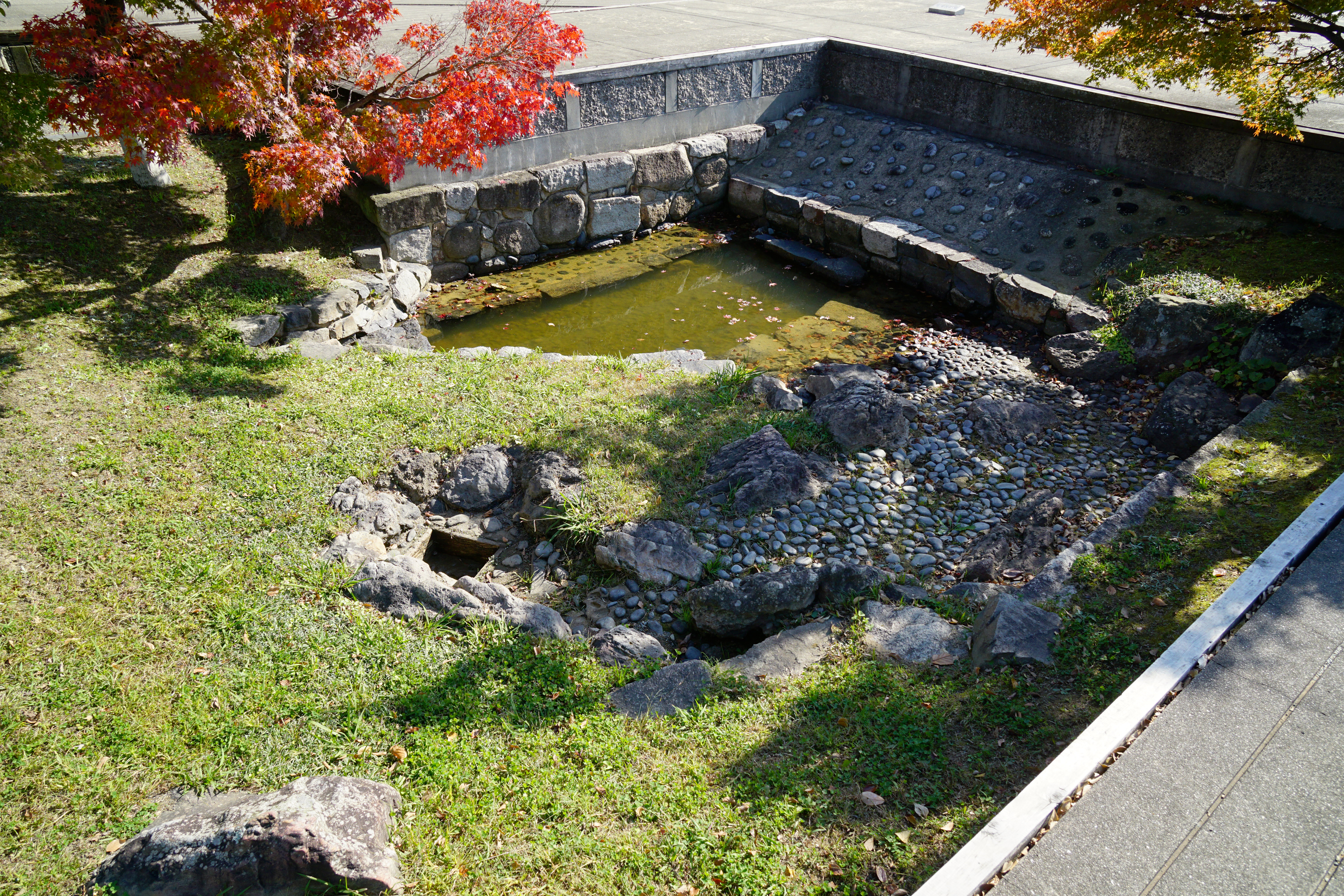
Honmaru Palace Tsubo-niwa

== See also ==
- List of Historic Sites of Japan (Hyōgo)
- List of Places of Scenic Beauty of Japan (Hyōgo)

== Literature ==
- Benesch, Oleg and Ran Zwigenberg (2019). Japan's Castles: Citadels of Modernity in War and Peace. Cambridge: Cambridge University Press. p. 374. ISBN 9781108481946.
- De Lange, William (2021). An Encyclopedia of Japanese Castles. Groningen: Toyo Press. pp. 600 pages. ISBN 978-9492722300.
- Schmorleitz, Morton S. (1974). Castles in Japan. Tokyo: Charles E. Tuttle Co. ISBN 0-8048-1102-4.
