= Karasuyama Domain =

Feudal domain of Edo Japan

Karasuyama Domain 烏山藩
- under Tokugawa shogunate Japan
- 1595–1871
- Capital: Karasuyama Castle
  - Type: Daimyō
- Historical era: Edo period
  - Established: 1595
  - Disestablished: 1871
- Today part of: part of Tochigi Prefecture

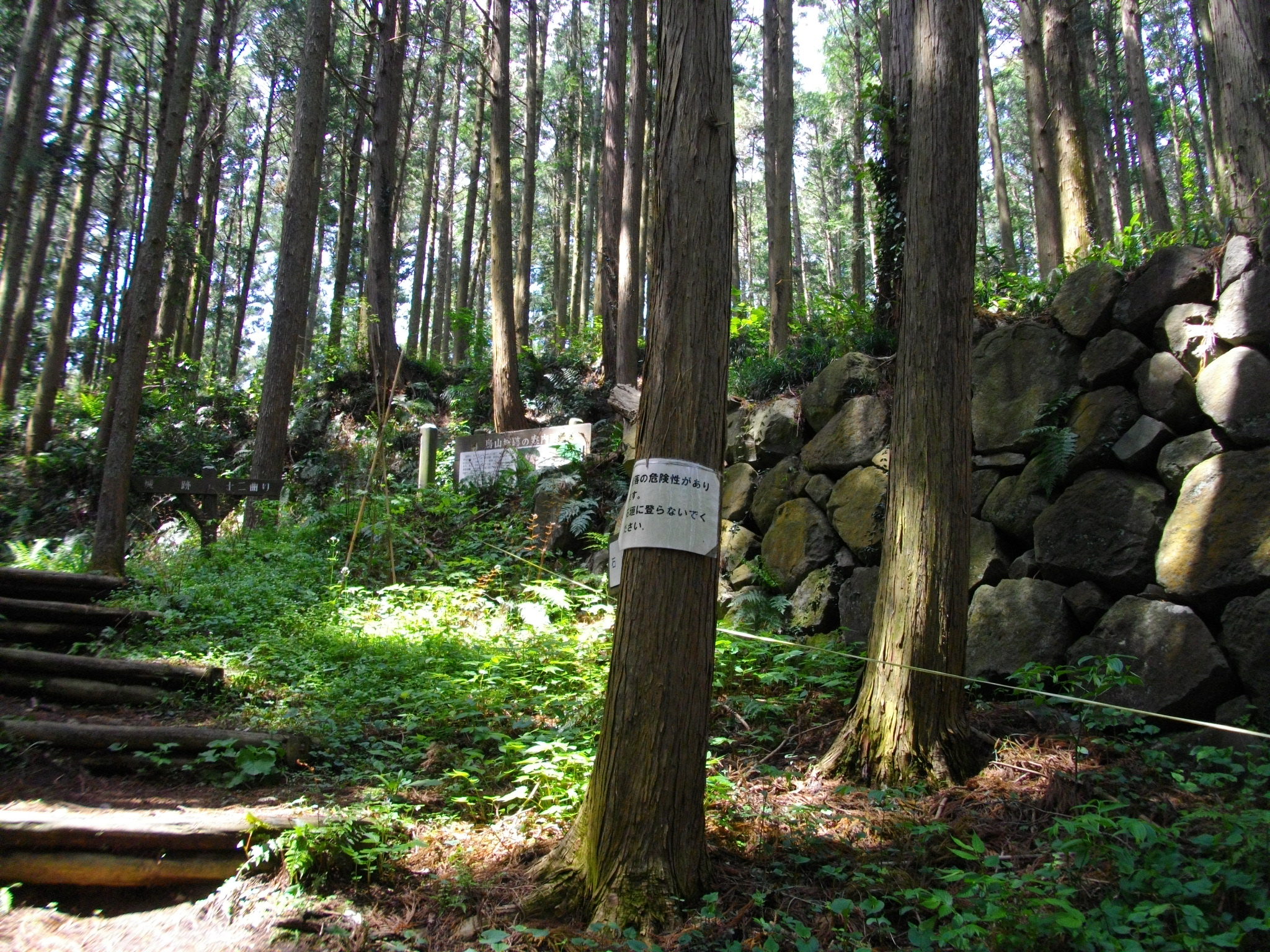
Ruins of Karasuyama Castle

Karasuyama Domain (烏山藩, Karasuyama-han) was a feudal domain under the Tokugawa shogunate of Edo period Japan, located in the Nasu region of northern Shimotsuke Province (modern-day Tochigi Prefecture), Japan. It was centered on Karasuyama Castle in what is now part of the city of Karasuyama, Tochigi. Karasuyama was ruled by a number of clans in its early history, but was ruled by a junior branch of the Ōkubo clan from the mid-Edo period onwards. The Karasuyama Ōkubo clan maintained a secondary jin'ya in what is now Atsugi, Kanagawa to administer its extensive holdings in Sagami Province.

== History ==
The Nasu clan ruled the Nasu district of northern Shimotsuke Province from the Kamakura period. During the late Sengoku period, partly for failing to participate in the 1590 Battle of Odawara, Toyotomi Hideyoshi divided their holdings, creating Nasu Domain (20,000 koku) for the Nasu clan, and awarding their ancestral castle, Karasuyama Castle and 20,000 koku to Narita Ujinaga. The Narita were vassals of the Odawara Hōjō, who pledged allegiance to the Toyotomi after the fall of their liege. Ujinaga’s son Narita Ujitada fought on the side of Tokugawa Ieyasu against the Uesugi clan and in the Battle of Sekigahara and was awarded an increase to 37,000 koku. His son, Narita Ujimune died without heir in 1622 and the clan was reduced to hatamoto status.

Karasuyama was briefly ruled by the Matsushita clan from 1623–1627, before their transfer to Nihonmatsu Domain. From 1627–1672, the Hori clan ruled Karasuyama, during which time they made extensive renovations to the castle and surrounding castle town. They were followed briefly by a branch of the Itakura clan (1672–1681) and then the Nasu clan (1682–1687). However, the Nasu were dispossessed by Shōgun Tokugawa Tsunayoshi following a succession dispute, and were replaced by Nagai Naohiro (1687–1701), who later was transferred to Ako Domain after its confiscation from Asano Naganori following the Forty-seven rōnin incident. A junior branch of the Itakura clan then ruled Karasuyama from 1701 to 1725.

Karasuyama was then awarded to Ōkubo Tsuneharu, a former wakadoshiyori who already had a 15,000 koku holding in Omi province. He later became a rōjū, and his descendants continued to rule Karasuyama until the end of the Tokugawa shogunate. The 3rd Ōkubo daimyō, Ōkubo Tadaaki faced severe financial difficulties compounded by peasant uprisings. His successors, Ōkubo Tadayoshi and Ōkubo Tadashige opened new rice lands and reformed the domain’s finances. The 6th Ōkubo daimyō, Ōkubo Tadayasu had able administrators, and followed the teachings of Ninomiya Sontoku.

The Boshin war of the Meiji restoration largely bypassed the area. After the abolition of the han system in July 1871, Karasuyama Domain became part of Tochigi Prefecture.

The domain had a population of 26,257 people in 5957 households for all of its holdings, per a census in 1869.

== Holdings at the end of the Edo period ==
As with most domains in the han system, Karasuyama Domain consisted of several discontinuous territories calculated to provide the assigned kokudaka, based on periodic cadastral surveys and projected agricultural yields. Due to its history, its majority of its territory was divided between Shimotsuke and Sagami Provinces.

- Shimotsuke Province
  - 13 villages in Haga District
  - 35 villages in Nasu District
  - 6villages in Moka District
- Shimōsa Province
  - 2 villages in Toyoda District
  - 1 village in Soma District
- Sagami Province
  - 2 villages in Kamakura District
  - 13 villages in Koza District
  - 7 villages in Osumi District
  - 10 villages in Aiko District

== List of daimyōs ==
#	Name	Tenure	Courtesy title	Court Rank	kokudaka
Narita clan (tozama) 1595–1622
1	Narita Ujinaga (成田氏長)	1595–1596	Shimōsa-no-kami (下総守)	Lower 5th (従五位下)	20,000 koku
2	Narita Yasuchika (成田泰親)	1596–1616	Saimon-no-jo (左衛門尉)	Lower 5th (従五位下)	20,000 ->37,000 koku
3	Narita Yasuyuki (成田泰之)	1616–1622	Sama-no-suke (左馬助)	Lower 5th (従五位下)	37,000 koku
Matsushita clan (tozama) 1623–1627
1	Matsushita Shigetsuna (松下重綱)	1623–1627	Iwami-no-kami (石見守)	Lower 5th (従五位下)	20,000 koku
Hori clan (tozama) 1627–1672
1	Hori Chikayoshi (堀親良)	1627–1637	Mimasaku-no-kami (美作守)	Lower 5th (従五位下)	20,000 koku
2	Hori Chikamasa (堀親昌)	1637–1672	Mimasaku-no-kami (美作守)	Lower 5th (従五位下)	20,000 koku
Itakura clan (fudai) 1672–1681
1	Itakura Shigenori (板倉重矩)	1672–1673	Naizen-no-kami (内膳正)	Lower 4th (従四位下)	50,000 koku
2	Itakura Shigetane (板倉重種)	1673–1681	Naizen-no-kami (内膳正)	Lower 4th (従四位下)	50,000 koku
Nasu clan (tozama) 1681–1687
1	Nasu Sukemasa (那須資祗)	1681–1687	Totomi-no-kami (遠江守)	Lower 5th (従五位下)	20,000 koku
2	Nasu Sukenori (那須資徳)	1687–1687	-none-	-none-	20,000 koku
Nagai clan (tozama) 1687–1701
1	Nagai Naohiro (永井直敬)	1687–1701	Izu-no-kami (伊豆守)	Lower 5th (従五位下)	30,000 koku
Inagaki clan (fudai) 1702–1725
1	Inagaki Shigetomi (稲垣重富)	1702–1710	Izumi-no-kami (和泉守)	Lower 5th (従五位下)	25,000 koku
2	Inagaki Terukata (稲垣昭賢)	1710–1725	Izumi-no-kami (和泉守)	Lower 5th (従五位下)	25,000 koku
Ōkubo clan (fudai) 1725–1871
1	Ōkubo Tsuneharu (大久保常春)	1725–1728	Yamashiro-no-kami (山城守)	Lower 5th (従五位下)	20,000 ->30,000 koku
2	Ōkubo Tadatane (大久保忠胤)	1728–1759	Yamashiro-no-kami (山城守)	Lower 5th (従五位下)	30,000 koku
3	Ōkubo Tadaaki (大久保忠卿)	1759–1769	Yamashiro-no-kami (山城守)	Lower 5th (従五位下)	30,000 koku
4	Ōkubo Tadayoshi (大久保忠喜)	1769–1812	Yamashiro-no-kami (山城守)	Lower 5th (従五位下)	30,000 koku
5	Ōkubo Tadashige (大久保忠成)	1805–1827	Sado-no-kami (佐渡守)	Lower 5th (従五位下)	30,000 koku
6	Ōkubo Tadayasu (大久保忠保)	1827–1848	Yamashiro-no-kami (山城守)	Lower 5th (従五位下)	30,000 koku
7	Ōkubo Tadayoshi (大久保忠美)	1848–1864	Sado-no-kami (佐渡守)	Lower 5th (従五位下)	30,000 koku
8	Ōkubo Tadayori (大久保忠順)	1864–1871	Sado-no-kami (佐渡守)	Lower 5th (従五位下)	30,000 koku
