= Asano Nagatomo =

Japanese daimyō

- Native name: 浅野 長友
- Born: November 4, 1643
- Died: February 20, 1675 (aged 31)
- Allegiance: Akō Domain
- Service years: 1671–1675
- Rank: Daimyō
- Children: Asano Naganori (son)

Asano Nagatomo (浅野 長友; November 4, 1643 – February 20, 1675) was a Japanese daimyō of the Edo period, who ruled the Akō Domain. He was the father of the famous Asano Naganori.

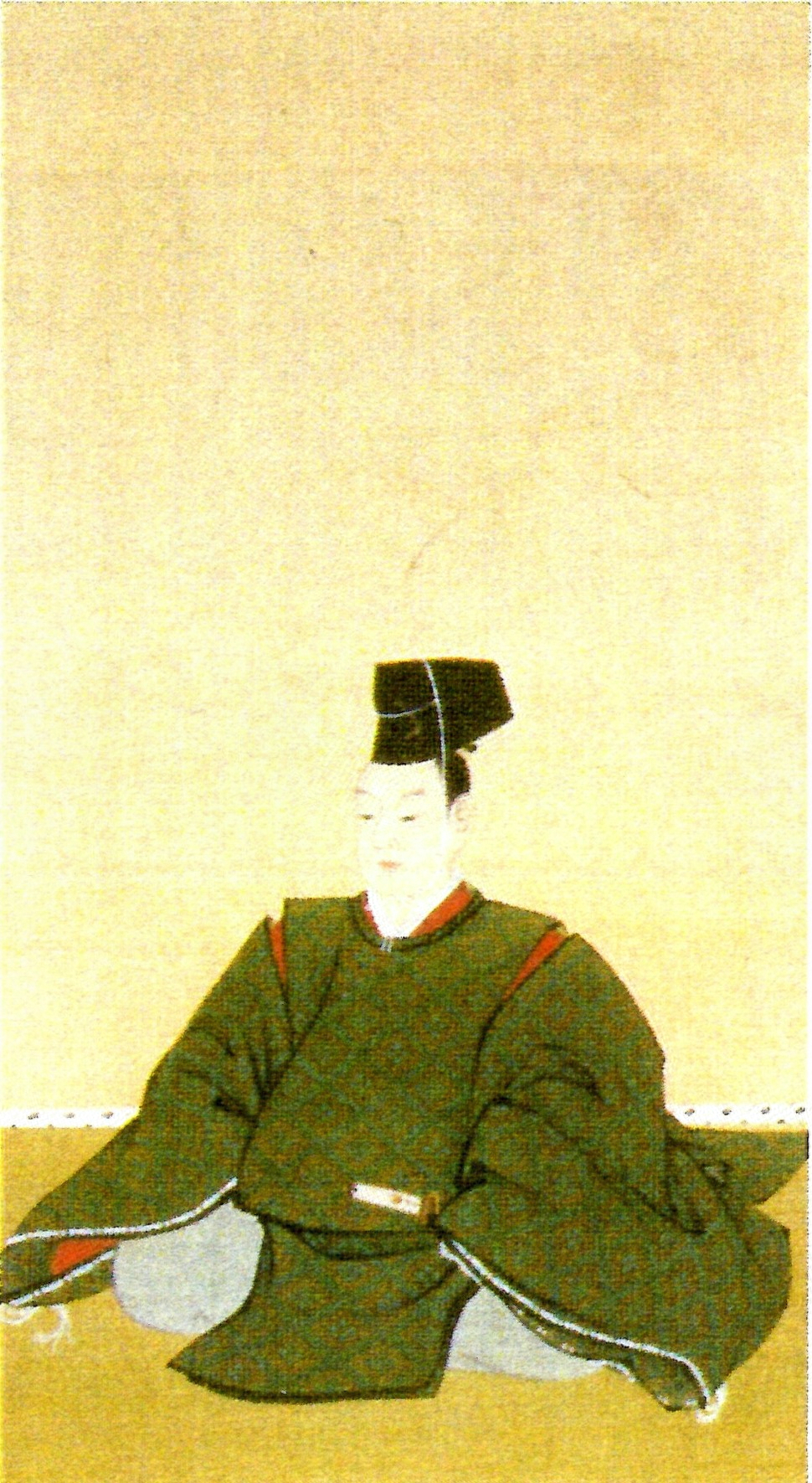
Portrait of Asano Nagatomo

Preceded by Asano Naganao	Daimyō of Akō; 1671–1675	Succeeded by Asano Naganori
