= Nagai Naotsune =

Japanese daimyō

Nagai Naotsune (永井 尚庸; 1631 – April 28, 1677) was a Japanese daimyō of the early Edo period. He served in a variety of positions in the Tokugawa shogunate, including wakadoshiyori and Kyoto Shoshidai.

Naotsune did not formally rule a domain; however, as he was given income from various lands within Kawachi Province rated at 20,000 koku, he was counted as a daimyō. His son Nagai Naohiro also became a high-ranking shogunate official.

Preceded by Itakura Shigenori	6th Kyoto Shoshidai; 1670–1677	Succeeded by Toda Tadamasa
