= List of places of scenic beauty of Japan (Hyōgo) =

This is list of the places of scenic beauty of Japan located within the Prefecture of Hyōgo.

== National Places of Scenic Beauty ==
As of 1 December 2025, nine Places have been designated at a national level.

Site	Municipality	Comments	Image	Coordinates	Type	Ref.
Anyō-in Gardens 安養院庭園; Anyō-in teien	Kobe			34°41′45″N 135°03′59″E	1	
Former Akō Castle Gardens 旧赤穂城庭園; Kyū-Akō-jō teien	Akō	designation includes the Honmaru Gardens (本丸庭園) and Ninomaru Gardens (二之丸庭園)		34°44′46″N 134°23′13″E	1	
Former Ōoka-ji Gardens 旧大岡寺庭園; Kyū-Ōokaji teien	Toyooka			35°30′29″N 134°43′15″E	1	
Keino-matsubara 慶野松原; Keino-matsubara	Minamiawaji			34°20′24″N 134°44′22″E	3, 8	
Kasumi Coast 香住海岸; Kasumi kaigan	Kami			35°39′02″N 134°36′23″E	5, 8	
Futatabi Park - Mount Futatabi Eikyū Vegetation Preservation Area - Kobe Municipal Foreign Cemetery 再度公園・再度山永久植生保存地・神戸外国人墓地; Futata kōen・Futatabi-san Eikyū shokusei hozon-chi ・Kōbe gaikokujin bochi	Kobe			34°43′18″N 135°10′27″E	1	
Tajima Mihonoura 但馬御火浦; Tajima Miho-no-ura	Kami, Shin'onsen	also a National Monument		35°39′17″N 134°29′43″E	5, 8	
Tabuchi Family Gardens 田淵氏庭園; Tabuchi-shi teien	Akō			34°43′52″N 134°24′27″E	1	
Former Ekishūkan Gardens 旧益習館庭園; Kyū-Ekishūkan teien	Sumoto			34°20′22″N 134°53′41″E	1	

== Prefectural Places of Scenic Beauty ==
As of 1 May 2025, twenty-two Places have been designated at a prefectural level.

Site	Municipality	Comments	Image	Coordinates	Type	Ref.
Taisan-ji Jōjū-in Gardens 太山寺成就院庭園; Taisan-ji Jōjū-in teien	Kobe			34°41′45″N 135°03′56″E		for all refs see
Former Ogawa Family Gardens 旧小河氏庭園 kyū-Ogawa-shi teien	Miki			34°47′44″N 134°58′59″E		
Shikagatsubo 鹿ケ壺; Shikagatsubo	Himeji			35°03′33″N 134°37′59″E		
Former Fukumoto Domain Ikeda Clan Jin'ya Gardens 旧福本藩池田家陣屋庭園 kyū-Fukumoto-han Ikeda-ke jin'ya teien	Kamikawa			35°03′37″N 134°46′25″E		
Mount Nagusa 七種山; Nagusa-yama	Fukusaki			35°00′47″N 134°41′56″E		
Ōshō-ji Gardens 應聖寺庭園; Ōshōji teien	Fukusaki			34°58′50″N 134°43′18″E		
Hiryū Falls and their vicinity 飛龍の滝及びその周辺; Hiryū-no-taki oyobi sono shūhen	Sayō			34°56′52″N 134°21′45″E		
Kanshō-ji Gardens 観正寺庭園; Kanshōji teien	Toyooka			35°37′57″N 134°50′11″E		
Kiri-hama Hasakari-iwa 切浜の「はさかり岩」 Kirihama-no-Hasakari-iwa	Toyooka			35°39′35″N 134°44′19″E		
Sukyō-ji Hondō Gardens 宗鏡寺本堂庭園; Sukyōji hondō teien	Toyooka			35°27′47″N 134°52′48″E		
Saruo Falls 猿尾滝; Saruo-daki	Kami			35°26′02″N 134°36′52″E		
Kirigataki Valley 霧が滝渓谷; Kirigataki keikoku	Shin'onsen			35°27′31″N 134°27′21″E		
Komata River Valley 小又川渓谷; Komata-gawa keikoku	Shin'onsen			35°29′14″N 134°26′30″E		
Enmyō-ji 円明寺庭園; Enmyōji teien	Asago			35°21′10″N 134°54′04″E		
Gonen-ji 護念寺庭園; Gonenji teien	Asago			35°20′20″N 134°51′56″E		
Sumiyoshi Jinja ("Suminoe") Gardens 住吉神社庭園「住之江の庭」 Sumiyoshi Jinja teien "Suminoe no niwa"	Tamba-Sasayama			35°00′07″N 135°05′49″E		
Enichi-ji Gardens 恵日寺庭園; Enichiji teien	Awaji			34°25′33″N 134°50′44″E		
Chōsen-ji Gardens 長泉寺庭園; Chōsenji teien	Awaji			34°29′43″N 134°51′51″E		
Myōshō-ji Gardens 妙勝寺庭園; Myōshōji teien	Awaji			34°30′08″N 134°57′53″E		
E-shima 絵島; E-shima	Awaji			34°35′23″N 135°01′18″E		
Jingū-ji Gardens 神宮寺庭園; Jingūji teien	Minamiawaji			36°22′49″N 139°26′25″E		
Gokoku-ji Gardens 護國寺庭園; Gokokuji teien	Minamiawaji			34°16′13″N 134°44′14″E		

== Municipal Places of Scenic Beauty ==
As of 1 May 2025, thirty-five Places have been designated at a municipal level.

== Registered Places of Scenic Beauty ==
As of 27 December 2025, eight Monuments have been registered (as opposed to designated) as Places of Scenic Beauty at a national level.

Place	Municipality	Comments	Image	Coordinates	Type	Ref.
Ogawa Family Gardens 小河氏庭園; Ogawa-shi teien	Miki			34°47′44″N 134°58′59″E		
Kajiwara Family Gardens 梶原氏(西梶原)庭園; Kajiwara-shi (Nishi-Kajiwara) teien	Himeji			34°46′45″N 134°45′34″E		
Sōraku-en 相楽園; Sōraku-en	Kobe			34°41′33″N 135°10′54″E		
Higashi-yūenchi 東遊園地; Higashi-yūenchi	Kobe			34°41′19″N 135°11′46″E		
Mitoro-en Gardens みとろ苑庭園; Mitoro-en teien	Kakogawa			34°48′02″N 134°53′56″E		
Onohara Family Gardens 斧原氏庭園; Onohara-shi teien	Nishinomiya					
Kiyohara Family Gardens 清原氏庭園; Kiyohara-shi teien	Ashiya					
Former Takahara Family Gardens 旧髙原氏庭園 kyū-Takahara-shi teien	Kasai					

== See also ==
- Cultural Properties of Japan
- List of parks and gardens of Hyōgo Prefecture
- List of Historic Sites of Japan (Hyōgo)
