= Iiyama Castle =

Japanese castle in Iiyama, Nagano prefecture

- 飯山城
- Iiyama, Nagano, Japan
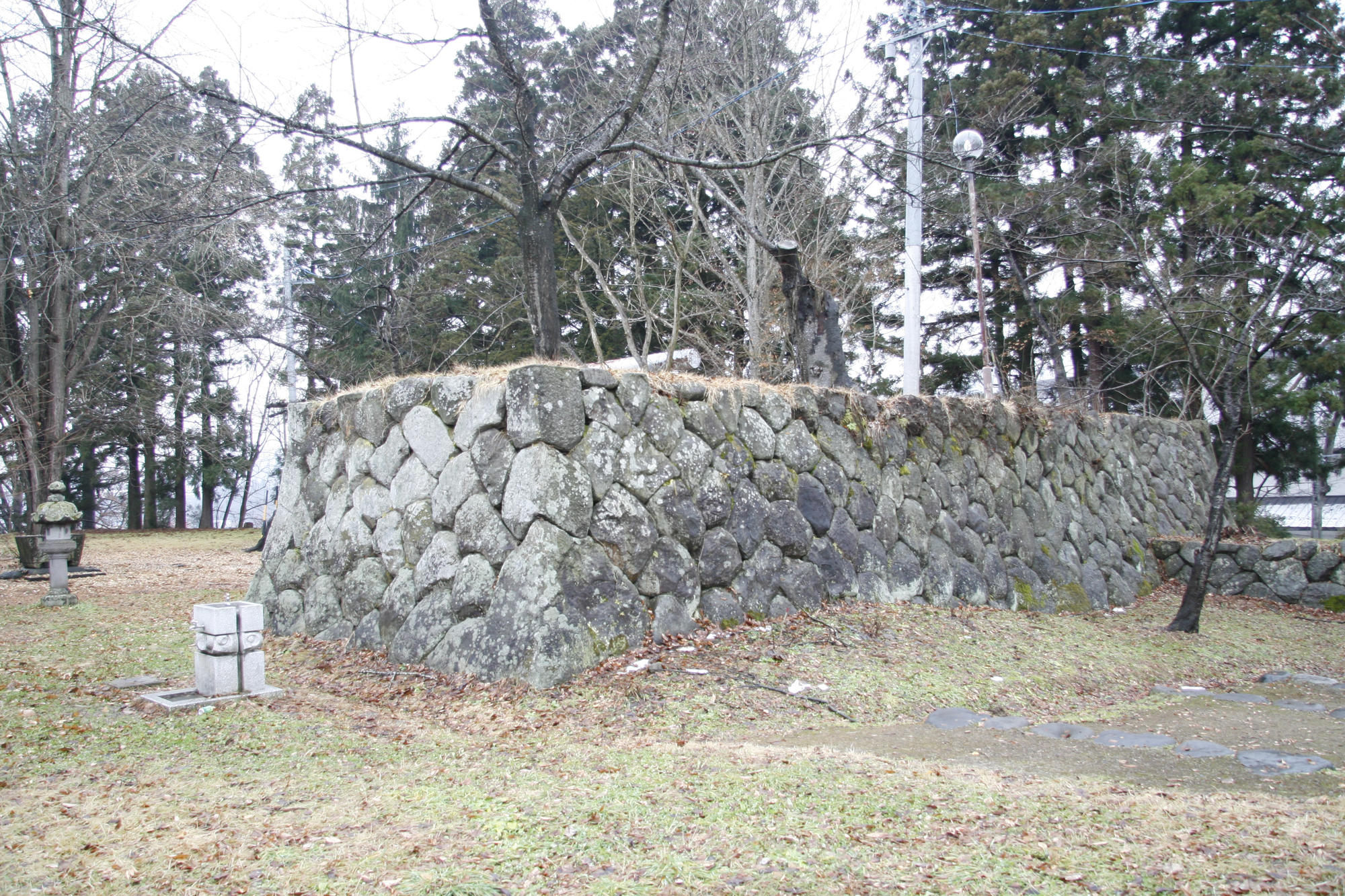
- Fragment of wall from Iiyama Castle

Site information
- Type: hirayama-style Japanese castle
- Controlled by: Uesugi clan, Honda clan
- Condition: Ruins

Location
- Location within Nagano Prefecture Location within Japan
- Coordinates: 36°51′23″N 138°21′58.5″E

Site history
- Built: Year Unknown
- In use: until 1868

Iiyama Castle (飯山城, Iiyama-jō) was a hirayama-style Japanese castle located in what is now part of the city of Iiyama, Nagano prefecture. It was the headquarters for Iiyama Domain under the Edo period Tokugawa Shogunate and its ruins are now a public park.

== Location ==
Iiyama Castle is located on a 30-meter hill next to the Chikuma River. The location is at the northeast edge of Nagano plain, and is a strategic point for guarding Echigo Province from attack from the south. A town developed here in the Kamakura period as this was a crossroad connecting the "Iiyama kaidō" road to the Jōetsu area with the "Tani kaidō" road to the Uonuma region in the center of Echigo.

== History ==
It is uncertain when the first fortification was built at Iiyama. During the late Heian period, the area was governed by the Takanashi clan, who were retainers of Minamoto Yoshinaka. The Takanashi grew in power during the Muromachi period, defeating the Nakano clan and seizing northeastern Shinano Province and were in constant conflict with the powerful Murakami clan. During the Sengoku period, the Murakami were defeated in a series of battles by Takeda Shingen, who then turned his attention to the Takanashi territories. The Takanashi made an alliance with Shingen's rival, Uesugi Kenshin, as Kenshin was the grandson of a woman from the Takanashi. Despite the alliance, Shingen was able to seize half of the Takanashi territory as Kenshin was unable to send reinforcements due to heavy snowfall. Around 1560, Kenshin rebuilt Iiyama Castle as his final stronghold in Shinano. The castle consisted of three kuruwa enclosures on the hilltop, with the back guarded by steep cliffs to the Chikuma River. The front had two smaller enclosures halfway up the hill to guard the main gate. The whole of these fortification was surrounded by a water moat connected to the Chikuma River. The enclosures were later improved with stone walls, fragments of which still remain.

Following the Battle of Kawanakajima from 1553 to 1564, Iiyama Castle was on the front line between the Takeda and the Uesugi and withstood numerous attacks. However, after the death of Uesugi Kenshin in 1578, his successor Uesugi Kagekatsu ceded the castle to Shingen's son, Takeda Katsuyori, as part of a peace treaty.

After the Takeda clan was destroyed by Oda Nobunaga in 1582, he assigned Iiyama Castle to his general, Mori Nagayoshi, along with Kaizu Castle. After Nobunaga was assassinated in the Honnō-ji Incident of the same year, Iiyama was recovered by Uesugi Kagekatsu, who modernized it as a border fortress. However, the Uesugi clan was relocated to Aizu in 1598 by Toyotomi Hideyoshi, and Iiyama Castle was reassigned by Hideyoshi to Seki Kazumasa.

Following the establishment of the Tokugawa shogunate, the castle came under the control of Matsudaira Tadateru as part of his 180,000 koku Kawanakajima Domain. He assigned the castle and 40,000 koku of this territory to Minagawa Hiroteru, who became an independent daimyō after Matsudaira Takateru was dispossessed by Shogun Tokugawa Hidetada in 1603. The castle then passed through various clans as the headquarters of Iiyama Domain until it came into the possession of a cadet branch of the Honda clan in 1717, who ruled Iiyama Domain until the Meiji restoration.

During the Boshin War, Iiyama castle was attacked by the Shōhōtai (衝鋒隊), an elite brigade of troops loyal to the Tokugawa shogunate, and was burned down. At present, the site of the inner bailey is now a Shinto shrine and the second bailey is a park noted for its sakura in spring. The castle ruins consist only of some fragments of walls, moats and earthen ramparts. However, three of the gates of the castle have survived: one at a temple in the city of Iiyama and another is at a temple in Nagano. Two more gates are in private hands. The gate formerly located at a temple in Iiyama has since been relocated to the castle grounds.

The castle site is a Prefectural Historic Site of Nagano prefecture.
