= Ikeda Teruoki =

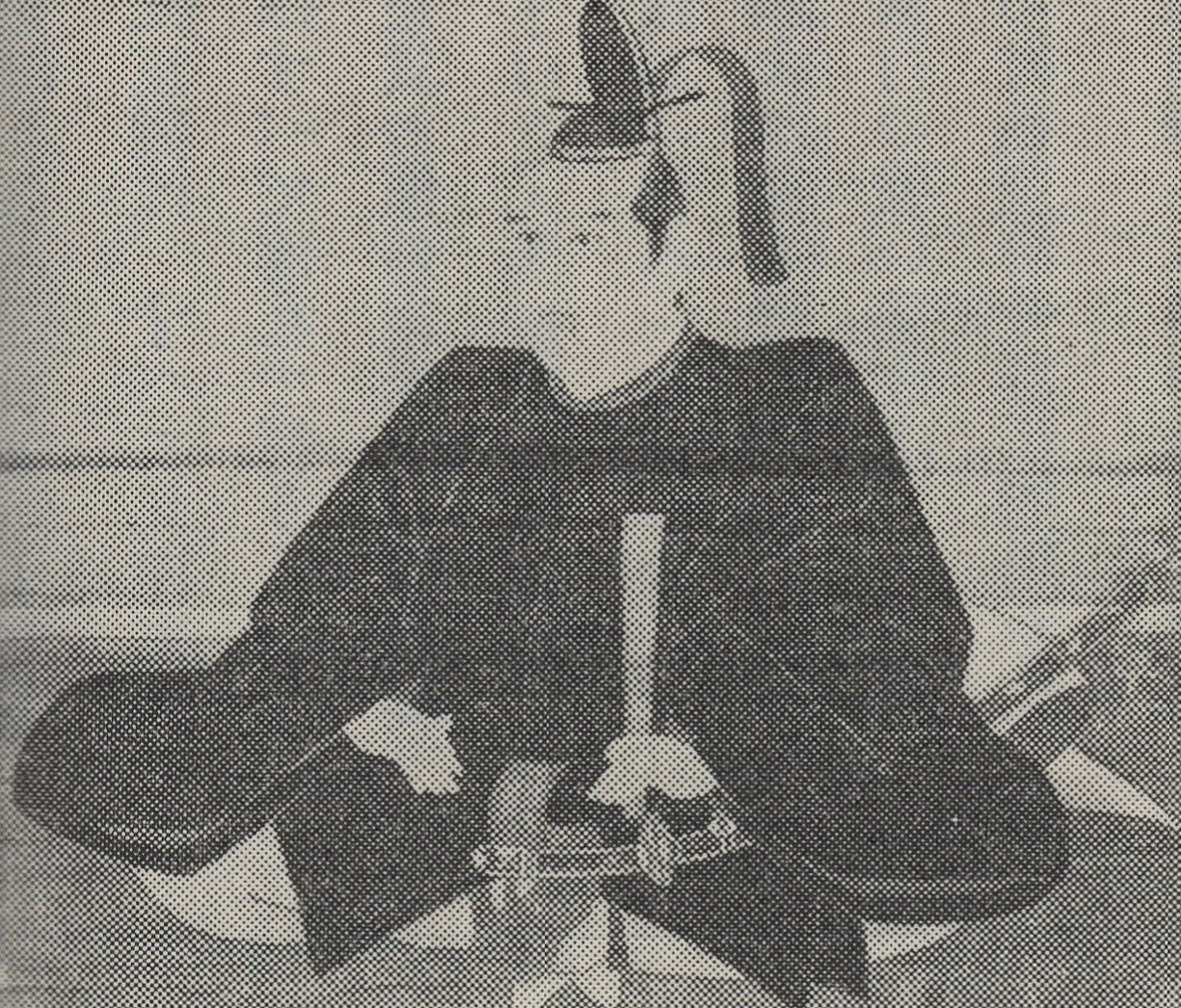
Ikeda Teruoki

Ikeda Teruoki (池田 輝興, 27 February 1611 – 19 June 1647) was a Japanese daimyō of the Edo period, who ruled the Akō Domain. His position was given to Asano Naganao in 1645 after Ikeda reportedly went mad, killing his wife and consorts.

Preceded by unknown	Daimyō of Akō; 1645–1645	Succeeded by Asano Naganao
