= Nagai Naohiro =

Japanese daimyō

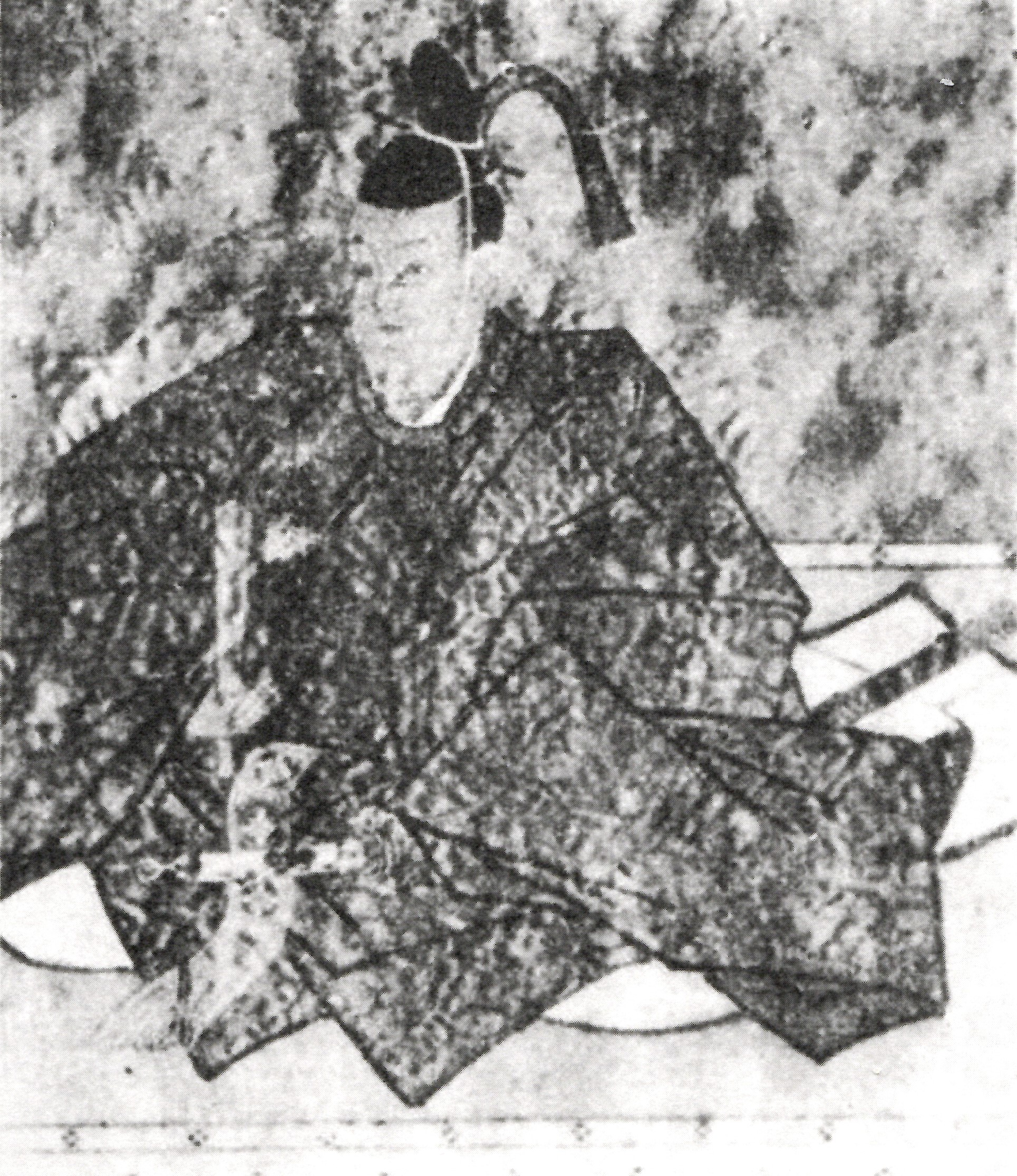

Daimyō of Karasuyama
- In office 1687–1701
- Preceded by: Nasu Sukenori
- Succeeded by: Inagaki Shigetomi

Daimyō of Akō
- In office 1701–1706
- Preceded by: Asano Naganori
- Succeeded by: Mori Naganao

Daimyō of Iiyama
- In office 1706–1711
- Preceded by: Matsudaira Tadataka
- Succeeded by: Aoyama Toshihide

Daimyō of Iwatsuki
- In office 1711–1711
- Preceded by: Ogasawara Nagahiro
- Succeeded by: Nagai Naohira

Nagai Naohiro (永井 直敬; 1664 – July 18, 1711) was a Japanese daimyō of the Edo period, who ruled the Akō Domain following its confiscation from Asano Naganori. Naohiro was the eldest son of Nagai Naotsune, and assumed family headship after his father's death. Upon the confiscation of the Nasu clan's territory in Shimotsuke Province, Naohiro was transferred there from his previous holdings in Kawachi, and thus became the lord of the Karasuyama Domain. Naohiro was appointed to the offices of jisha-bugyō and sōshaban in 1694, and in the fall of 1701, after the execution of Asano Naganori, he received a 3000 koku increase in stipend, becoming the new lord of Akō, with a territory of 33,000 koku. However, because of the time-consuming nature of his work as jisha-bugyō, the domain's affairs were run by his retainers. Naohiro subsequently became a wakadoshiyori in 1704. He was moved to Iiyama in 1706, and Iwatsuki in 1711; Naohiro died soon after the move, in the summer of 1711. His son Naohira succeeded to the family headship.

Naohiro's grave is at Kōunji Temple, in Nakano City, Tokyo.

Preceded by Nasu Sukenori	Daimyō of Karasuyama; 1687–1701	Succeeded by Inagaki Shigetomi
Preceded by Asano Naganori	Daimyō of Akō; 1701–1706	Succeeded by Mori Naganao
Preceded by Matsudaira Tadataka	Daimyō of Iiyama; 1706–1711	Succeeded by Aoyama Yoshihide
Preceded by Ogasawara Nagahiro	Daimyō of Iwatsuki; 1711	Succeeded by Nagai Naohira
