= Iiyama Domain =

Feudal domain under the Tokugawa shogunate

Iiyama Domain 飯山藩
- under Tokugawa shogunate Japan
- 1603–1871
- Capital: Iiyama Castle
- Area
  - Coordinates: 36°51′23″N 138°21′58.5″E
  - Type: Daimyō
- Historical era: Edo period
  - Established: 1603
  - Disestablished: 1871
- Today part of: part of Nagano Prefecture

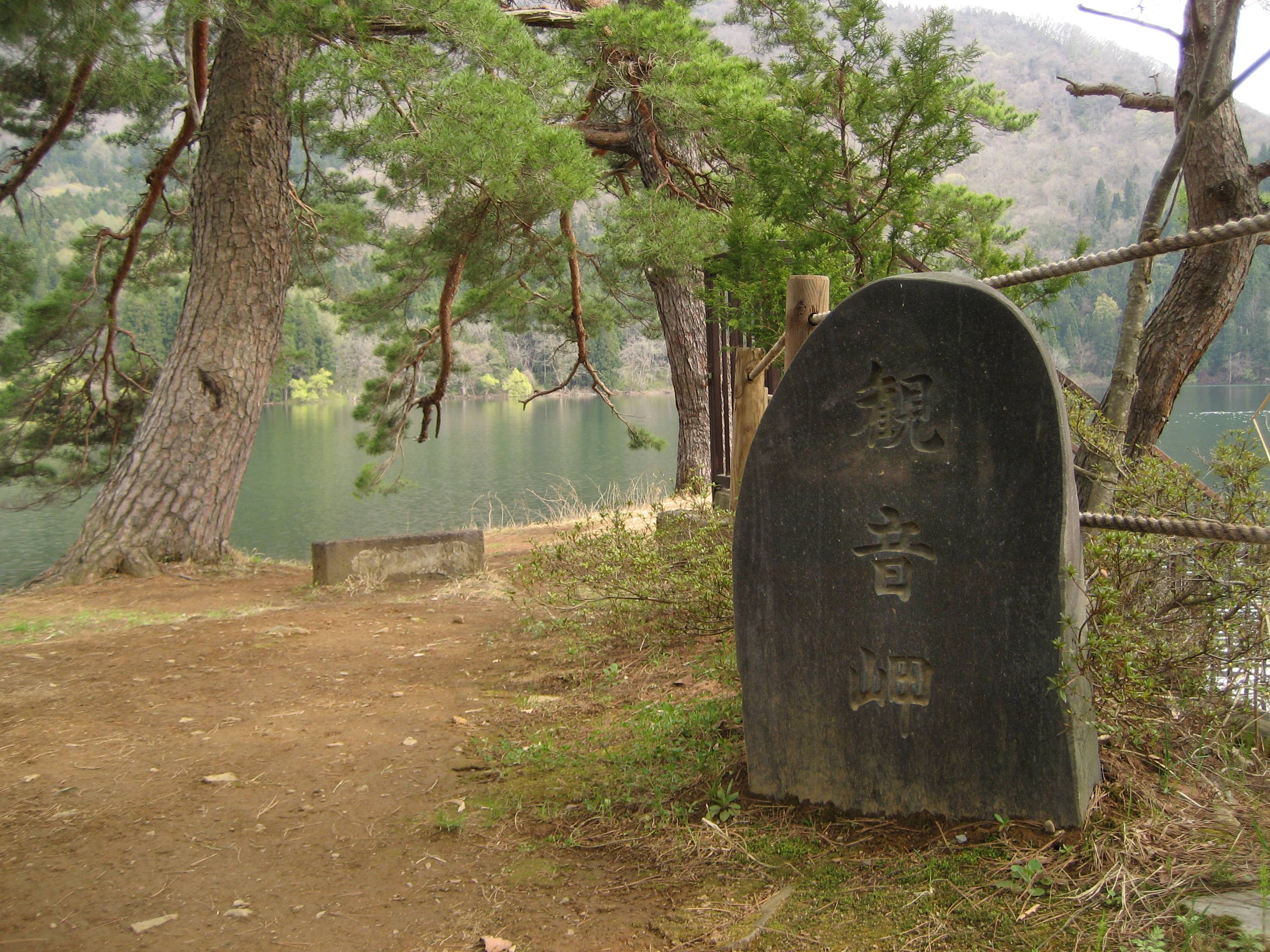
Kannonsaki, a location in Iiyama

Iiyama Domain (飯山藩, Iiyama-han) was a feudal domain under the Tokugawa shogunate of Edo period Japan. It was located in northern Shinano Province, Honshū. The domain was centered at Iiyama Castle, located in what is now part of the city of Iiyama in Nagano Prefecture.

== History ==
In 1603, when Matsudaira Tadateru was awarded Kawanakajima Domain, the area around Iiyama was assigned to his retainer, Minagawa Hiroteru as a 40,000 koku holding. This marked the start of Iiyama Domain. however, after Matsudaira Tadateru fell from favour with shōgun Tokugawa Ieyasu and was dispossessed, Minagawa Hiroteru suffered a similar fate and was demoted to the 10,000 koku Hitachi-Fuchū Domain. He was replaced by Hori Naoteru from a cadet branch of the Hori clan of Echigo Province. Hori Naoteru took active steps in flood control and the opening of new rice lands to improve the domain. However, he was transferred to Nagaoka Domain in 1616. Iiyama then went to Sakuma Yasumasa, the son of one of Oda Nobunaga's famed generals, Sakuma Morimasa. The Sakuma clan ruled for three generations until the line died out without an heir in 1638. Iiyama Domain was then assigned to a branch of the Matsudaira clan, formerly from Kakegawa Domain. The Matsudaira ruled for two generations, and returned to Kakegawa in 1706. Iiyama was then assigned to Nagai Naohiro, formerly lord of Akō Domain immediately after the famed Forty-seven rōnin incident. He remained only until 1711 when he was replaced by Toyama Yoshihide, who also stayed for only six years before he too was transferred elsewhere.

In 1717, Iiyama Domain was awarded to a cadet branch of the Honda clan, under whose control it remained until the Meiji Restoration. During the Boshin War, the domain was invaded by pro-Tokugawa forces from Takada Domain, who set fire to the castle town. The domain subsequently supported the imperial armies at the Battle of Hokuetsu and Battle of Aizu. In July 1871, with the abolition of the han system, Iiyama Domain briefly became Iiyama Prefecture, and was merged into the newly created Nagano Prefecture.

== Bakumatsu period holdings ==
As with most domains in the han system, Iiyama Domain consisted of several discontinuous territories calculated to provide the assigned kokudaka, based on periodic cadastral surveys and projected agricultural yields.

- Shinano Province
  - 58 villages in Minochi District

== List of Daimyō ==
#	Name	Tenure	Courtesy title	Court Rank	kokudaka	Notes
Minagawa clan (fudai) 1603–1609
1	Minagawa Hiroteru (皆川広照)	1603–1609	Yamashiro-no-kami (山城守)	Junior 4th Rank, Lower Grade (従四位下)	40,000 koku	transfer to Hitachi-Fuchū Domain
Hori clan (tozama) 1610–1616
1	Hori Naoyori (堀直寄)	1610–1616	Tango-no-kami (丹後守)	Junior 5th Rank, Lower Grade (従五位下)	40,000 koku	transfer to Nagaoka Domain
Sakuma clan (tozama) 1616–1638
1	Sakuma Yasumasa (佐久間安政)	1616–1627	Bizen-no-kami (備前守)	Junior 5th Rank, Lower Grade (従五位下)	30,000 koku	transfer from Omi-Takashima Domain
2	Sakuma Yasunaga (佐久間安長)	1628–1632	Hyūga-no-kami (日向守)	Junior 5th Rank, Lower Grade (従五位下)	30,000 koku	
3	Sakuma Yasutsugu (佐久間安次)	1632–1638	-none-	-none-	30,000 koku	died without heir
Matsudaira (Sakurai) clan, (fudai) 1639–1706 1639–1706 (fudai; 40,000 koku)
1	Matsudaira Tadatomo (松平忠倶)	1639–1696	Tōtōmi-no-kami (遠江守)	Junior 5th Rank, Lower Grade (従五位下)	40,000 koku	transfer from Kakegawa Domain
2	Matsudaira Tadataka (松平忠喬)	1696–1706	Tōtōmi-no-kami (遠江守)	Junior 5th Rank, Lower Grade (従五位下)	40,000 koku	transfer to Kakegawa Domain
Nagai clan (fudai) 1706–1711
1	Nagai Naohiro (永井直敬)	1706–1711	Iga-no-kami (伊賀守)	Junior 5th Rank, Lower Grade (従五位下)	33,000 koku	transfer to Iwatsuki Domain
Aoyama clan (fudai) 1711–1717
1	Aoyama Yoshihide (青山幸秀)	1711–1717	Daizen-no-suke (大膳亮)	Junior 5th Rank, Lower Grade (従五位下)	48,000 koku	transfer to Miyazu Domain
Honda clan (fudai) 1717–1871
1	Honda Sukeyoshi (本多助芳)	1717–1725	Wakasa-no-kami (若狭守)	Junior 5th Rank, Lower Grade (従五位下)	20,000→35,000 koku	transfer from Itoigawa Domain
2	Honda Yasuakira (本多康明)	1725–1730	Bungo-no-kami (豊後守)	Junior 5th Rank, Lower Grade (従五位下)	35,000 koku	
3	Honda Sukemochi (本多助有)	1730–1737	Ise-no-kami (伊勢守)	Junior 5th Rank, Lower Grade (従五位下)	35,000 koku	
4	Honda Sukemitsu (本多助盈)	1737–1774	Sagami-no-kami (相模守)	Junior 5th Rank, Lower Grade (従五位下)	35,000 koku	
5	Honda Suketsugu (本多助受)	1774–1806	Bungo-no-kami (豊後守)	Junior 5th Rank, Lower Grade (従五位下)	35,000 koku	
6	Honda Suketoshi (本多助賢)	1806–1858	Bungo-no-kami (豊後守)	Junior 5th Rank, Lower Grade (従五位下)	35,000 koku	
7	Honda Sukezane (本多助実)	1858–1867	Ise-no-kami (伊勢守)	Junior 5th Rank, Lower Grade (従五位下)	35,000 koku	
8	Honda Sukeshige (本多助成)	1867–1868	Ise-no-kami (伊勢守)	Junior 5th Rank, Lower Grade (従五位下)	35,000 koku	
9	Honda Suketaka (本多助寵)	1868–1869	none -	none -	35,000 koku	
10	Honda Sukezane (本多助実)	1869–1871	Ise-no-kami (伊勢守)	Junior 5th Rank, Lower Grade (従五位下)	35,000 koku	

=== Honda Sukeyoshi ===
Honda Sukeyoshi (本多助芳; 1663 – 25 May 1725) was a daimyō in the early Edo period Tokugawa shogunate of Japan. He was the 2nd Honda daimyō of Murayama Domain in Dewa Province, daimyō of Itoigawa Domain in Echigo province and 1st Honda daimyō of Iiyama Domain in Shinano Province. Sukeyoshi was born in Edo as the younger son of a 4560 koku hatamoto of Okazaki Domain in Tōtōmi province. He received a 300 koku stipend on the death of his father in 1669. In 1688, he was adopted as the heir to Honda Toshinaga of Murayama Domain and was received in formal audience by Shōgun Tokugawa Tsunayoshi. He became daimyō of Murayama (10,000 koku) on the death of his adopted father in 1693. In 1699, the Tokugawa shogunate ordered his transfer to Itoigawa, with the same kokudaka, and he was given the courtesy title of Wakasa-no-kami. In 1717, he was transferred to Iiyama (12,000 koku), where his descendants resided to the Meiji Restoration. He also changed his name from Toshihisa (利久) to Sukeyoshi (助芳). However, due to repeated flooding of the Chikuma River and the mountainous terrain of his new holding, he found that the actual financial situation in Iiyama was much worse than its kokudaka reflected, and from the start the domain suffered from financial problems. His wife was a daughter of Matsudaira Sadashige of Kuwana Domain. He died in 1727 and his grave is at the temple of Kyōzen-ji in Roppongi, Tokyo.

=== Honda Yasuakira ===
Honda Yasuakira (本多康明; 1709 – 21 September 1730) was the 2nd Honda daimyō of Iiyama Domain. Yasuakira was born in Edo and was the third son of Honda Sukeyoshi. As his two elder brothers died in childhood, he became daimyō on the death of his father in 1725. However, in 1730 en route to visit his holdings in Iiyama, he fell ill and died soon after reaching Iiyama Castle at the age of 22. His grave is at the temple of Chuon-ji in Iiyama.

=== Honda Sukemochi ===
Honda Sukemochi (本多助有; June 1714– 13 October 1737) was the 3rd Honda daimyō of Iiyama Domain. Sukemochi was the fourth son of Honda Sukeyoshi, and was posthumously adopted as heir on his brother Yasuakira's sudden death without heir in 1730. However, he was in poor health from infancy, and he also died without male heir in 1737 at the age of 24. His wife was a daughter of Suwa Tadatora of Suwa Domain. His grave is at the temple of Kyōzen-ji in Roppongi, Tokyo.

=== Honda Sukemitsu ===
Honda Sukemitsu (本多助盈; May 1718– 16 March 1774) was the 4th Honda daimyō of Iiyama Domain. Sukemitsu born into a hatamoto cadet branch of the Honda clan, and was posthumously adopted as heir on Honda Sukemochi's sudden death in 1737. During his tenure, the domain suffered from severe floods in 1742. He served in the shogunal administration as Osaka kaban and as a sōshaban. His courtesy title was originally Sagami-no-kami, but was later changed to Bungo-no-kami, then to Ise-no-kami with each promotion. He retired in 1773 due to poor health and died the following year. His wife was a daughter of Akita Yorisue of Miharu Domain; however, he only son predeceased him and he was succeeded by his grandson. His grave is at the temple of Kyōzen-ji in Roppongi, Tokyo.

=== Honda Suketsugu ===
Honda Suketsugu (本多助受; 3 June 1764 – 9 July 1824) was the 5th Honda daimyō of Iiyama Domain. Suketsugu the eldest son of Honda Sukemitsu's eldest son, and became ‘'daimyō'’ on his grandfather's death in 1774. He was received in formal audience by Shōgun Tokugawa Ieharu the same year, but did not receive the courtesy title of Bungo-no-kami until 1782. From 1785 to 1788 as he served as Osaka kaban and in 1789 was bugyō of ceremonies at the Nikkō Tōshō-gū. However, in 1794, the domain suffered severe damage from a fire, and perhaps due to the strain of this event, he made rude comments on the music of the Ryūkyū embassy to the shogunate and was censured by the government. Iiyama burned down again in 1798. In retired in favor of his adopted son in 1806. His wife was a daughter of Niwa Takayasu of Nihonmatsu Domain. In 1824 his courtesy title was changed from Bungo-no-kami to Shima-no-kami. He died in 1824 in Edo, and his grave is at the temple of Kyōzen-ji in Roppongi, Tokyo.

=== Honda Suketoshi ===
Honda Suketoshi (本多助賢; 6 February 1791 – 23 October 1858) was the 6th Honda daimyō of Iiyama Domain. Suketoshi was born as the younger son of Toda Ujinori of Ogaki Domain. He married Suketsugu's daughter and was adopted has heir by Honda Suketsugu in 1806. He was received in formal audience by Shōgun Tokugawa Ienari and became daimyō later the same year. In 1811, was named bugyō of ceremonies at the Nikkō Tōshō-gū and in 184 became a sōshaban. In 1832, he became a wakadoshiyori. He retired in 1858 and died later the same year.

=== Honda Sukezane ===
Honda Sukezane (本多助実; 23 April 1819 – 1 March 1877) was the 7th Honda daimyō of Iiyama Domain. Sukezane was born in Edo and was the third son of Honda Suketsugu. As he was still underage when Suketsugu retired, his uncle-in-law, Honda Suketoshi became daimyō and Sukezane became Suketoshi's heir. He was received in formal audience by Shōgun Tokugawa Ienari in 1836 and became ‘'daimyō'’ in 1858. From 1864 to 1866 he served as a sōshaban. He retired in 1867; however, due to the poor health of his two successors, he continued to rule the domain behind-then-scenes, and in 1871 was appointed imperial governor of Iiyama by the new Meiji government. He retired again in 1873 and died in 1877. His wife was the 5th daughter of Suwa Tadamichi of Suwa Domain and after her death, he remarried to a daughter of Yonekura Masanaga of Mutsuura Domain. His grave is at the temple of Kyōzen-ji in Roppongi, Tokyo.

=== Honda Sukeshige ===
Honda Sukeshige (本多助成; 6 August 1846– 2 August 1868) was the 8th Honda daimyō of Iiyama Domain. Sukeshige was the eldest son of Honda Sukezane. He was received in formal audience by Shōgun Tokugawa Iemochi in 1861. He was unusually tall for contemporary Japanese, and was stilled in the martial arts, as well as poetry and literature. In 1866, he led the domain's troops to Osaka during the Second Chōshū expedition in place of his ill father, and became daimyō the following year on his father's retirement. In 1868, during the Boshin War, the new Meiji government fined the domain 15,000 ryō for its previously uncooperative attitude. Ten days later, a civil war erupted in Iiyama between supporters of the Tokugawa and the pro-imperial faction. Sukeshige died 3 months later at the age of 23, possibly due to poisoning. In order to avoid the possibility of attainder, the fact of his death was kept secret from the authorities and it was officially announced that he had retired in favor of his younger brother. He had no official wife. His grave is at the temple of Chuon-ji in Iiyama.

=== Honda Suketaka ===
Honda Suketaka (本多助寵; 8 June 1854– 19 September 1869) was the 9th Honda daimyō of Iiyama Domain. Suketaka was the 8th son of Honda Sukezane, and was posthumously adopted on the sudden death of his brother Honda Sukeshige in 1868. In poor health, he was a figurehead ruler, and his father Sukezane ruled behind-the-scenes throughout his tenure. The new Meiji government demanded 5000 ryō from the domain to help offset costs associated with the Battle of Hokuetsu. He was appointed imperial governor of Iiyama in 1869; however, he died less than 2 months later at the age of 16. As with his predecessor, the death was kept secret from the government for fear of attainer, and it was officially announced that he had retired, and that his father, Shigezane, had returned from retirement to assume the post. His grave is at the temple of Chuon-ji in Iiyama.

== See also ==
- List of Han
