= Akō Domain =

Japanese feudal domain located in Harima Province

Akō Domain 赤穂藩
- under Tokugawa shogunate Japan
- 1615–1871
- Capital: Akō Castle
- Area
  - Coordinates: 34°44′44.41″N 134°23′20.34″E
- Government
  - Type: Daimyō
- Historical era: Edo period
  - Established: 1615
  - Disestablished: 1871
- Today part of: part of Hyogo Prefecture

Location of Akō Castle
Akō Domain (Japan)

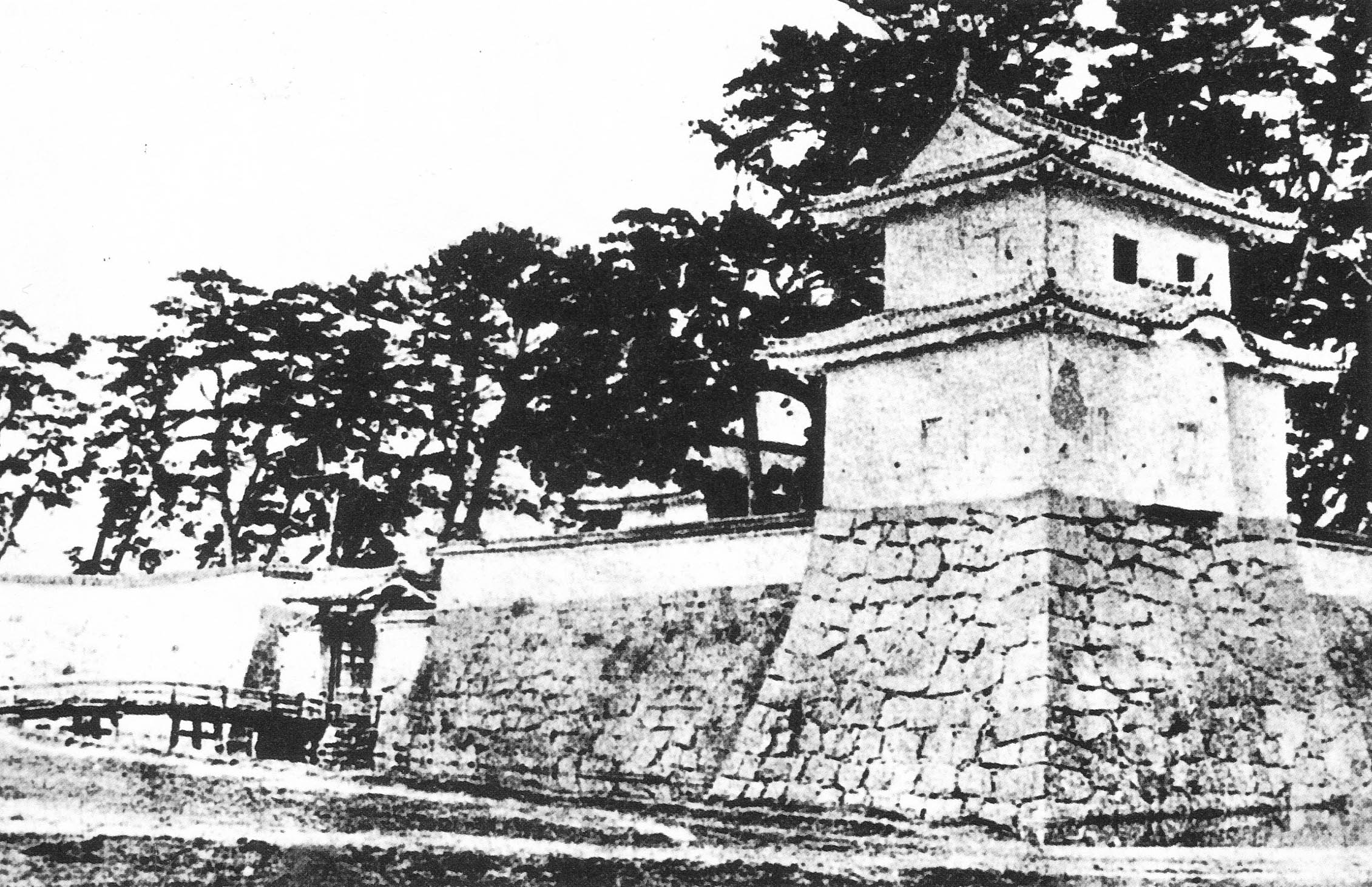
Akō Castle

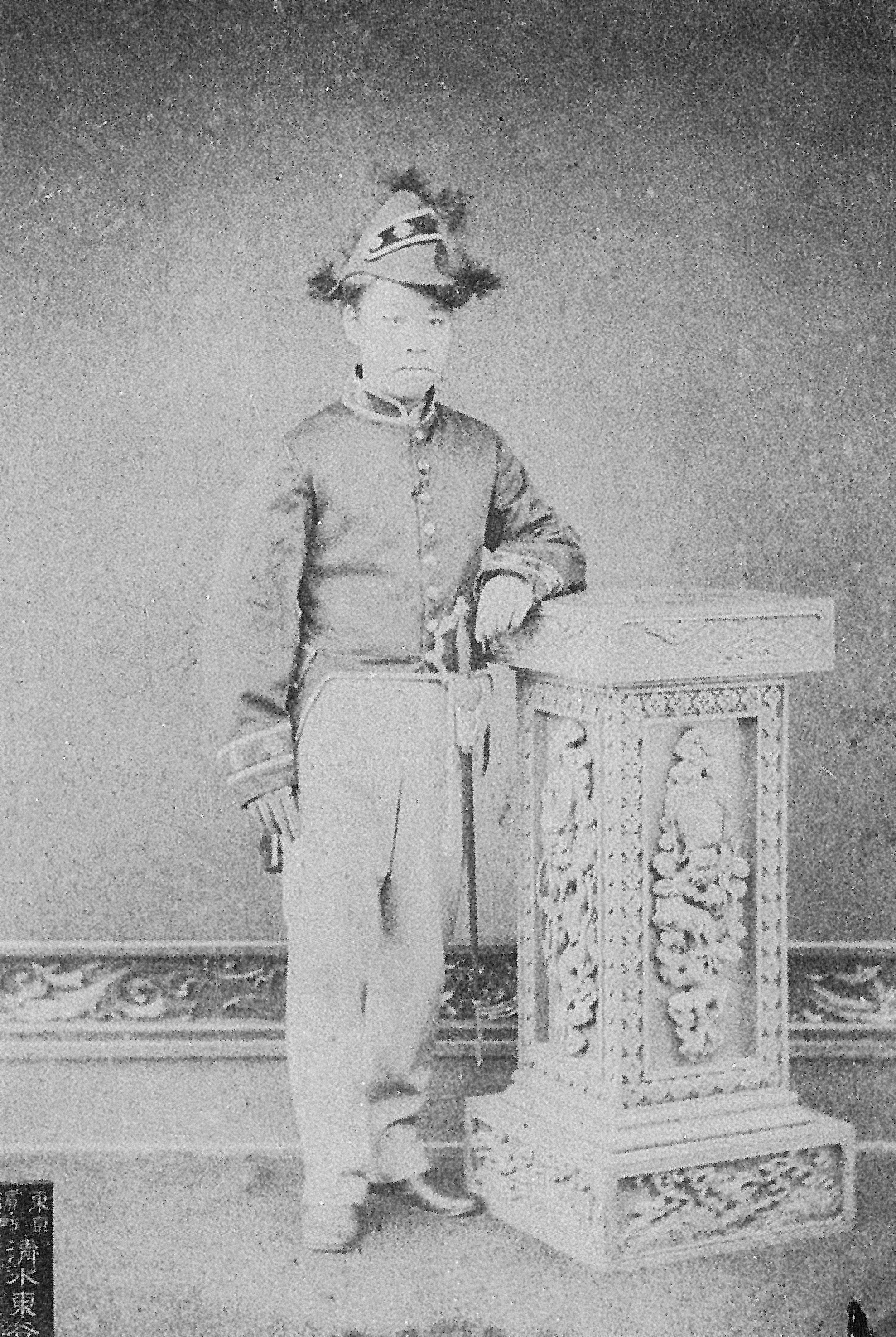
Mori Tadanori, last daimyō of the Akō Domain

Akō Domain (赤穂藩, Akō-han) was a feudal domain under the Tokugawa shogunate of Edo period Japan, located in Harima Province in what is now the southwestern portion of modern-day Hyōgo Prefecture. It was centered around Akō Castle, which is located in what is now the city of Akō, Hyōgo.

== History ==
During the Muromachi period, the area of Akō District was under the control of the Akamatsu clan, the shugo of Harima Province. In the Sengoku period, it was part of the holdings of Ukita Hideie. During the Battle of Sekigahara, Ukita Hideie sided with the losing Western Army, and his territories were confiscated by the victorious Tokugawa Ieyasu, who awarded the area to his general and son-in-law Ikeda Terumasa. His vast holdings were broken up after his death, and his fifth son, Ikeda Masatsuna received a 35,000 koku portion which had been assigned as the widow's portion to his mother Tokuhime. This marked the start of Akō Domain. His younger brother, Ikeda Teruoki, inherited the domain in 1631. However, he went insane in 1645, murdering his concubine and several ladies-in-waiting, and was dispossessed.

The domain was awarded to Asano Naganao, formerly of Kasama Domain in Hitachi Province. Nagaoki spend 13 years building Akō Castle on a scale far in excess of his kokudaka of 53,000 koku and also reconstructed the castle town. In order to alleviate the financial situation, he expanded on coastal salt production (which had been a speciality of the area since the Yayoi period to support the clan's finances. The third daimyō, Asano Naganori was assigned to provide security for the 1682 Joseon missions to Japan and also had to handle a judicial case involving the assassination of Tairō Hotta Masatoshi by Inaba Masayasu. However, he is more famously known for being one the principal participants in the famous 1702 Akō Incident, in which he was forced to commit seppuku after attempting to kill a powerful shogunal named Kira Yoshinaka and was subsequently avenged by his now masterless retainers.

The Asano clan was replaced at Akō Domain by Nagai Naohiro, formerly of Karasuyama Domain in Shimotsuke Province. However, five years later, in 1706, he was transferred to Iiyama Domain in Shinano Province. The domain was then given to Mori Naganao, who had been daimyō of a 20,000 koku sub-domain of Tsuyama Domain called "Nishiebara Domain". The Mori clan ruled Akō for 165 years until the end of the Edo period. During the Bakumatsu period, pro-Sonnō jōi samurai murdered the domain's karō in front of the gate of Akō Castle in 1861. The revolt was suppressed and seven of the 13 perpetrators were executed. In 1871, with the abolition of the han system, Akō Domain became Akō Prefecture, and was incorporated into Hyōgo prefecture via Shikama Prefecture. The Mori family became viscounts (shishaku) in the kazoku peerage system in 1884.

== Holdings at the end of the Edo period ==
As with most domains in the han system, Ako Domain consisted of several discontinuous territories calculated to provide the assigned kokudaka, based on periodic cadastral surveys and projected agricultural yields.

- Harima Province
  - 42 villages in Ako District

== List of daimyō ==
#	Name	Tenure	Courtesy title	Court Rank	kokudaka
Ikeda clan, 1615-1645 (Tozama)
1	Ikeda Masatsuna (池田政綱)	1615 - 1631	Ukyō-no-daifu (右京大夫)	Junior 4th Rank, Lower Grade (従四位下)	35,000 koku
2	Ikeda Teruoki (池田輝興)	1631 - 1645	Ukyō-no-daifu (右京大夫)	Junior 4th Rank, Lower Grade (従四位下)	35,000 koku
Asano clan, 1645-1701 (Tozama)
1	Asano Naganao (浅野長直)	1645 - 1671	Uchi-no-takumi-no-kami (内匠頭)	Junior 5th Rank, Lower Grade (従五位下)	53,000 koku
2	Asano Nagatomo (浅野長友)	1671 - 1675	Uneme-no-kami (采女正)	Junior 5th Rank, Lower Grade (従五位下)	53,000 -> 50,000 koku
3	Asano Naganori (浅野長矩)	1675 - 1701	Uchi-no-takumi-no-kami (内匠頭)	Junior 5th Rank, Lower Grade (従五位下)	50,000 koku
Nagai clan, 1701-1706 (Fudai)
1	Nagai Naohiro (永井直敬)	1701 - 1706	Iga-no-kami (伊賀守)	Junior 5th Rank, Lower Grade (従五位下)	32,000 koku
Mori clan, 1706-1871 (Tozama)
1	Mori Naganao (森長直)	1706 - 1722	Izumi-no-kami (和泉守)	Junior 5th Rank, Lower Grade (従五位下)	20,000 koku
2	Mori Nagataka (森長孝)	1722 - 1723	Shima-no-kami (志摩守)	Junior 5th Rank, Lower Grade (従五位下)	20,000 koku
3	Mori Naganari (森長生)	1723 - 1731	Etchū-no-kami (越中守)	Junior 5th Rank, Lower Grade (従五位下)	20,000 koku
4	Mori Masafusa (森政房)	1731 - 1746	Ise-no-kami (伊勢守)	Junior 5th Rank, Lower Grade (従五位下)	20,000 koku
5	Mori Tadahiro (森忠洪)	1747 - 1769	Izumi-no-kami (和泉守)	Junior 5th Rank, Lower Grade (従五位下)	20,000 koku
6	Mori Tadaoki (森忠興)	1769 - 1780	Yamashiro-no-kami (山城守)	Junior 5th Rank, Lower Grade (従五位下)	20,000 koku
7	Mori Tadasuke (森忠賛)	1780 - 1801	Uhyoe-no-suke (右兵衛佐)	Junior 5th Rank, Lower Grade (従五位下)	20,000 koku
8	Mori Tadaakira (森忠哲)	1801 - 1807	Izumi-no-kami (和泉守)	Junior 5th Rank, Lower Grade (従五位下)	20,000 koku
9	Mori Tadayoshi (森忠敬)	1807 - 1824	Etchū-no-kami (越中守)	Junior 5th Rank, Lower Grade (従五位下)	20,000 koku
10	Mori Tadatsura (森忠貫)	1824 - 1827	-none-	-none-	20,000 koku
10	Mori Tadanori (森忠徳)	1827 - 1862	Etchū-no-kami (越中守)	Junior 5th Rank, Lower Grade (従五位下)	20,000 koku
11	Mori Tadatsune (森忠典)	1862 - 1868	Mimasaka-no-kami (美作守)	Junior 5th Rank, Lower Grade (従五位下)	20,000 koku
12	Mori Tadanori (森忠儀)	1868 - 1871	Mimasaka-no-kami (美作守)	Junior 5th Rank, Lower Grade (従五位下)	20,000 koku

== See also ==
- List of Han
- Abolition of the han system
