= Mori Naganao =

Japanese daimyō of the mid-Edo period

Mori Naganao (森 長直, January 9, 1672 – October 4, 1722) was a Japanese daimyō of the mid-Edo period, who ruled the domain of Nishi-Ebara before being transferred to Akō.

Naganao was the 11th son of Mori Nagatsugu, the lord of the Tsuyama Domain (later moved to Nishi-Ebara). Nagatsugu was succeeded by Naganao's elder brother Nagatake in 1674, and after Nagatake's retirement in 1686, his nephew Naganari succeeded to the family headship. Naganao was left out of this line, but received a stipend of 1500 hyō from Naganari in 1694. Naganao became lord of Nishi-Ebara in 1698, and was transferred to the Ako domain in 1706. His descendants remained as rulers of the domain until the Meiji Restoration.

Preceded by Mori Nagatsugu	Daimyō of Nishi-Ebara; 1698-1706	Succeeded by none (domain abolished)
Preceded by Nagai Naohiro	Daimyō of Akō; 1706-1722	Succeeded by Mori Nagataka
