= Asano Naganao =

Japanese daimyō

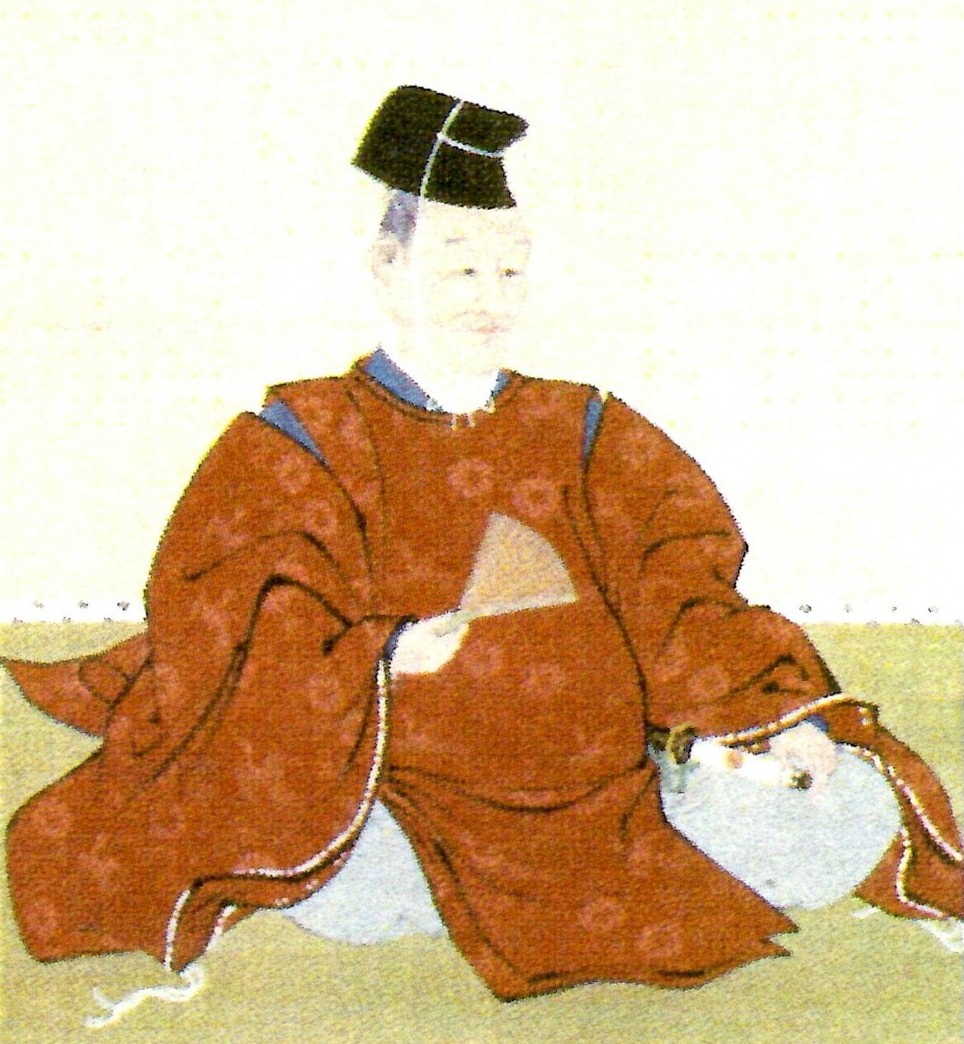
Asano Naganao

Asano Naganao (浅野 長直, 1610 – September 15, 1672) was a Japanese daimyō of the Edo period, who ruled the Akō Domain. He was classified as a tozama, and Akō under his rule was 53,000 koku in size. Naganao was responsible for the construction of Akō Castle.

Preceded by Asano Nagashige	Daimyō of Kasama; 1632–1645	Succeeded by Inoue Masatoshi
Preceded by Ikeda Teruoki	Daimyō of Akō; 1645–1671	Succeeded by Asano Nagatomo
