= Asano Naganori =

Daimyō of the Akō Domain (1667–1701)

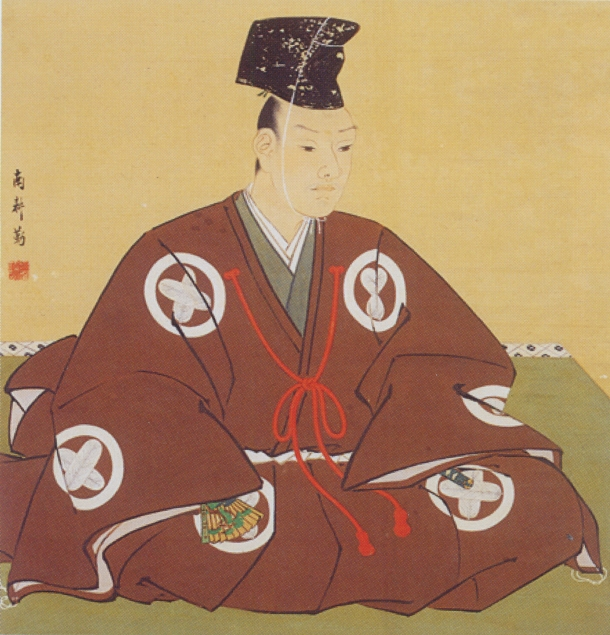
Asano Naganori

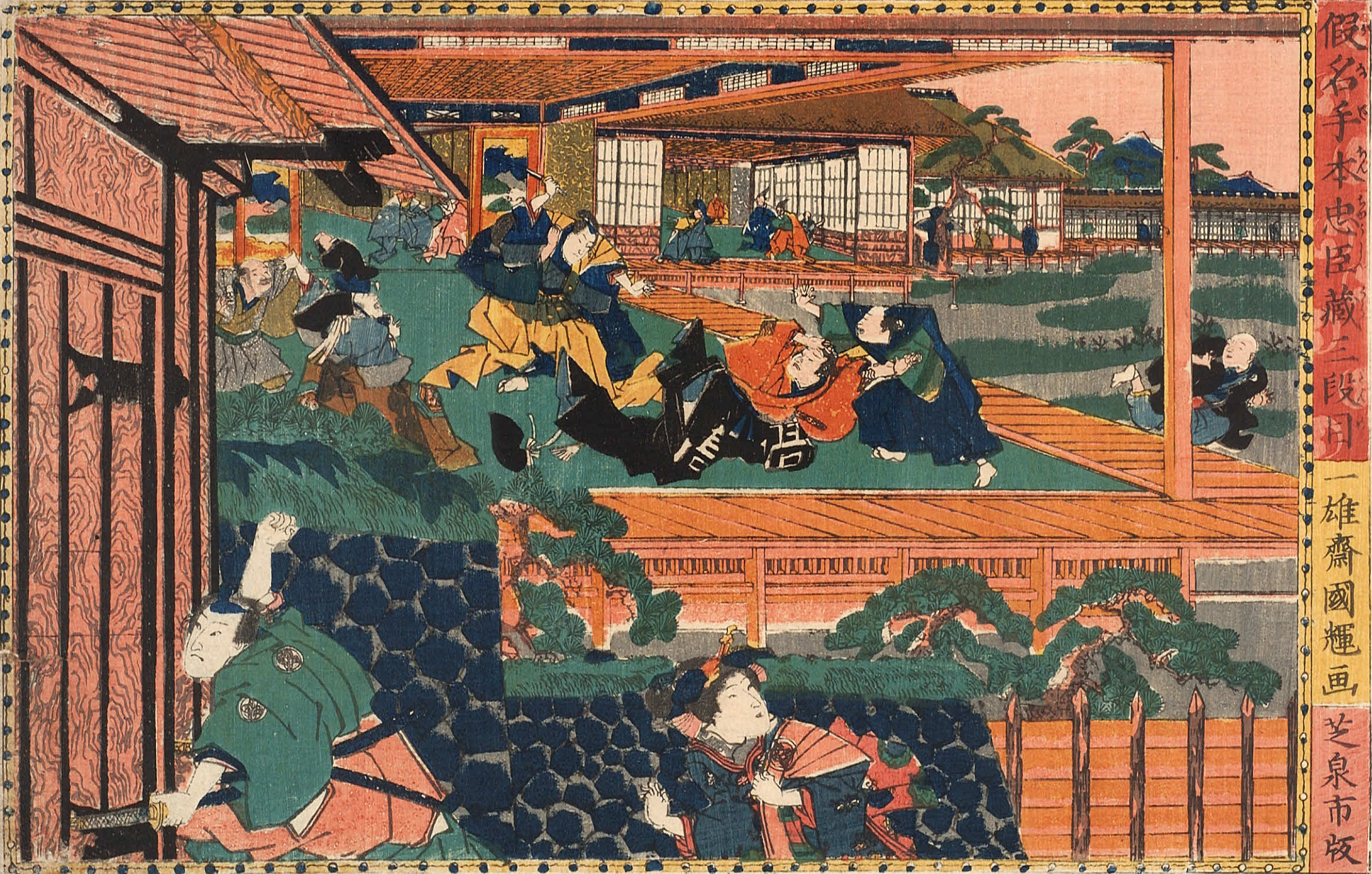
Ukiyo-e depicting the assault by Asano Naganori on Kira Yoshinaka in the Matsu no Ōrōka of Edo Castle

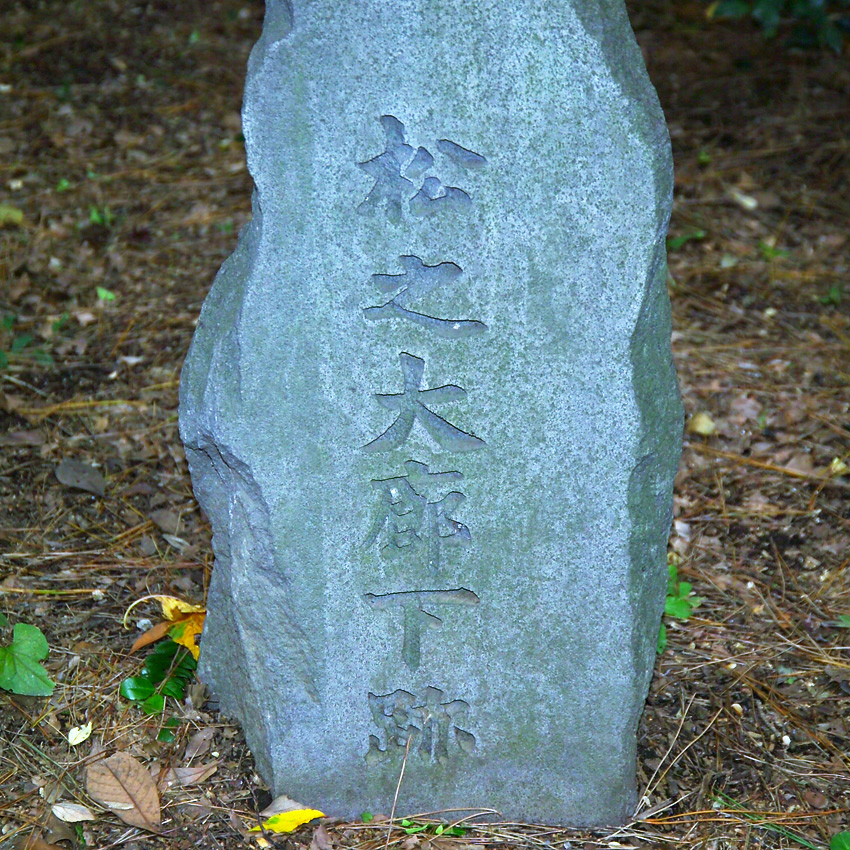
Monument at the location of the Corridor of the Pines at the Tokyo Imperial Palace (formerly Edo Castle)

Asano Naganori (浅野 長矩; September 28, 1667 – April 21, 1701) was the daimyō of the Akō Domain in Japan (1675–1701). His title was Takumi no Kami (内匠頭). He is known as the person who triggered a series of incidents retold in a story known as Chūshingura (involving the forty-seven rōnin), one of the favourite themes of kabuki, jōruri, and Japanese books and films.

== Biography ==
He was born in Edo as the eldest son of Asano Nagatomo. His family was a branch of the Asano clan whose main lineage was in Hiroshima. His grandfather Naganao was appointed to the position of daimyō of Ako with 50 thousand koku. After Naganao died in 1671, Nagatomo succeeded to the position, but died after three years in 1675. Naganori succeeded his father at the age of nine.

In 1680, he was appointed to the office of Takumi no Kami, the head of carpentry at the imperial court, but this office was nominal, as were other offices granted to samurai at that time, and only had an honorific meaning. As a daimyō with a small fief, he was appointed several times to temporary minor offices of the Tokugawa shogunate. In 1683, he was first appointed one of two officials to host the emissaries from the imperial court to the Shogunate. It was the first time he met Kira Yoshinaka, the highest-ranking kōke, the head of ceremonial matters at the Shogunate, who instructed officials in the manner of hosting noble guests from Kyoto.

In 1694, he suffered from a serious illness. He had no children, thus no heir at that time. When a daimyo died without a determined heir, his house would be abolished by the shogunate, and his lands confiscated; his retainers became rōnin. To prevent this, he adopted his younger brother Asano Nagahiro, titled Daigaku, who was accepted as his heir apparent by the shogunate.

In 1701, he was appointed for the second time to the same office. It is said that he was then on bad terms with Kira Yoshinaka, and tension between them increased.

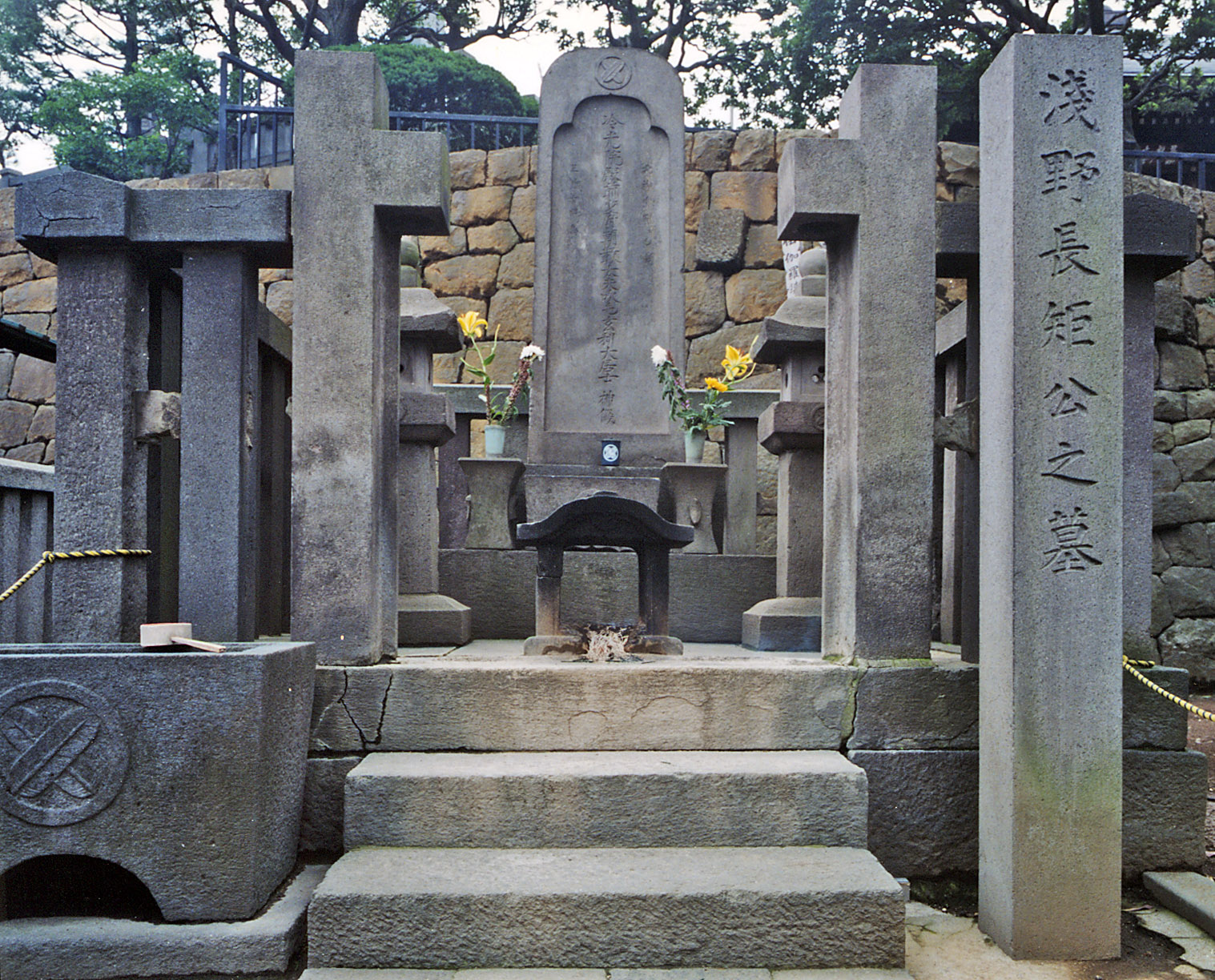
Grave of Asano Naganori at Sengaku-ji

On the day of his death, he drew his short sword (Wakizashi) and attempted to kill Kira in the Corridor of the Pines at Edo Castle in what is now Tokyo. He was wounded and failed to kill Kira. On the same day, the fifth Tokugawa shōgun Tsunayoshi sentenced him to commit seppuku, which he did after writing his death poem:

「風さそう 花よりもなお 我はまた 春の名残を いかにとやせん」

"kaze sasou / hana yori mo nao / ware ha mata / haru no nagori wo / ika ni toyasen."

"More than the cherry blossoms, Inviting a wind to blow them away, I am wondering what to do,

With the remaining springtime."

== Death and legacy ==
He was buried in the graveyard of Sengaku-ji.

His retainers became ronin when the Shogunate confiscated his fief. Under the leadership of Ōishi Kuranosuke, however, they avenged the death of their lord by killing Kira Yoshinaka at his mansion in Edo on December 15, 1702. These former retainers became famous as the forty-seven rōnin, and their vendetta ranks as one of the most renowned in Japan.

Preceded by Asano Nagatomo	Daimyo of Akō; 1675–1701	Succeeded by Nagai Naohiro
