= Makino (surname) =

Makino (written: 牧野 or 槙野) is a Japanese surname. Notable people with the surname include:

- Akira Makino (牧野 明; 1922–2007)
- Anna Makino (牧野 アンナ; born 1971), Japanese singer
- Makino Chikashige (牧野 親成; 1607–1677), Japanese daimyō
- Fred Kinzaburo Makino (牧野 金三郎, 1877–1953), Japanese newspaper editor
- Makino Hideshige (牧野 英成; 1671–1741), Japanese daimyō
- Hiroko Makino (牧野 紘子; born 1999), Japanese swimmer
- Hiroshi Makino (born 1956), Japanese golfer
- Kazu Makino (カズ 牧野), Japanese musician
- Keisuke Makino (牧野 景輔; born 1969), Japanese footballer
- Kiyo Makino (born 1875), Japanese educator
- Maria Makino (牧野 真莉愛; born 2001), Japanese singer
- Masahiro Makino (マキノ 雅弘; 1908–1993), Japanese film director
- Mitsunori Makino (牧野 光則; born 1988), Japanese shogi player
- Naoki Makino (牧野 直樹; born 1976), Japanese footballer
- Makino Narisada (牧野 成貞; 1634–1712), Japanese daimyō
- Nina Makino (牧野 仁菜; born 2005), A member of the Japanese group NiziU and former actress
- Makino Nobuaki (牧野 伸顕; 1861–1949), Japanese statesman
- Makino Sadamichi (牧野 貞通; 1707–1749), Japanese daimyō
- Makino Sadanaga (牧野 貞長; 1733–1796), Japanese daimyō
- Shigeru Makino (牧野 茂; 1928–1984), Japanese baseball player and coach
- Shinji Makino (牧野 真二; born 1976), Japanese footballer
- Shiro Makino (牧野 四郎; 1893–1945), Japanese general
- Shozo Makino (disambiguation), multiple people
- Makino Tadahiro (牧野 忠寛; 1741–1766), Japanese daimyō
- Makino Tadakatsu (牧野 忠毅; 1859–1918), Japanese daimyō
- Makino Tadakiyo (牧野 忠精; 1760–1831), Japanese daimyō
- Makino Tadakuni (牧野 忠訓; 1844–1875), Japanese daimyō
- Makino Tadamasa (牧野 忠雅; 1799–1858), Japanese daimyō
- Tadasuke Makino (牧野 任祐; born 1997), Japanese racing driver
- Makino Tadayuki (牧野 忠恭; 1824–1878), Japanese daimyō
- Takao Makino (牧野 京夫; born 1959), Japanese politician
- Tomitaro Makino (牧野 富太郎; 1862–1957), Japanese botanist
- Tomoaki Makino (槙野 智章; born 1987), Japanese footballer
- Tsuyoshi Makino (牧野 剛; 1945–2016), Japanese writer, critic and social activist
- Yui Makino (牧野 由依; born 1986), Japanese actress, voice actress, singer and pianist
- Yukio Makino (牧野 幸雄), Japanese sailor
