= Makino (disambiguation) =

Makino is a Japanese machine tool manufacturing company.

Makino may also refer to:

- Makino (surname), a Japanese surname
- Makino clan, a Japanese clan
- Makino, Shiga, a former town in Takashima District, Shiga Prefecture, Japan
- Makino, the standard author abbreviation used to indicate Tomitaro Makino as the author when citing a botanical name
- Makino Station (disambiguation), multiple railway stations in Japan
- Makino River, a river of New Zealand
- Makino Film Productions, an early Japanese film studio
