= Tadahiro =

- Gender: Male

Origin
- Origin: Japanese
- Meaning: Different meanings depending on the kanji used

Tadahiro (written: 忠熙, 忠寛, 忠弘, 忠広, 忠宏, 忠洋 or 忠恕) is a masculine Japanese given name. Notable people with the name include:

- Tadahiro Aizawa (相沢 忠洋; 1926–1989), Japanese amateur archaeologist
- Tadahiro Akiba (秋葉 忠宏; born 1975), Japanese footballer and manager
- Tadahiro Ando (安藤 忠恕; 1941–2010), Japanese politician
- Konoe Tadahiro (近衛 忠熙; 1808–1898), Japanese noble
- Tadahiro Kosaka (小坂 忠広; born 1960), Japanese racewalker
- Makino Tadahiro (牧野 忠寛; 1741–1766), Japanese daimyō
- Tadahiro Matsushita (松下 忠洋; 1939–2012), Japanese politician
- Mizuno Tadahiro (水野 忠弘; 1856–1905), Japanese daimyō
- Tadahiro Nomura (野村 忠宏; born 1974), Japanese judoka
- Tadahiro Ogino (荻野 忠寛; born 1982), Japanese baseball player
- Tadahiro Sasaki (佐々木 忠広; born 1970), Japanese boxer
- Tadahiro Sekimoto (関本 忠弘; 1926–2007), Japanese engineer
- Tadahiro Takayama (高山 忠洋; born 1978), Japanese golfer
