= Itakura Shigemasa =

Japanese daimyō

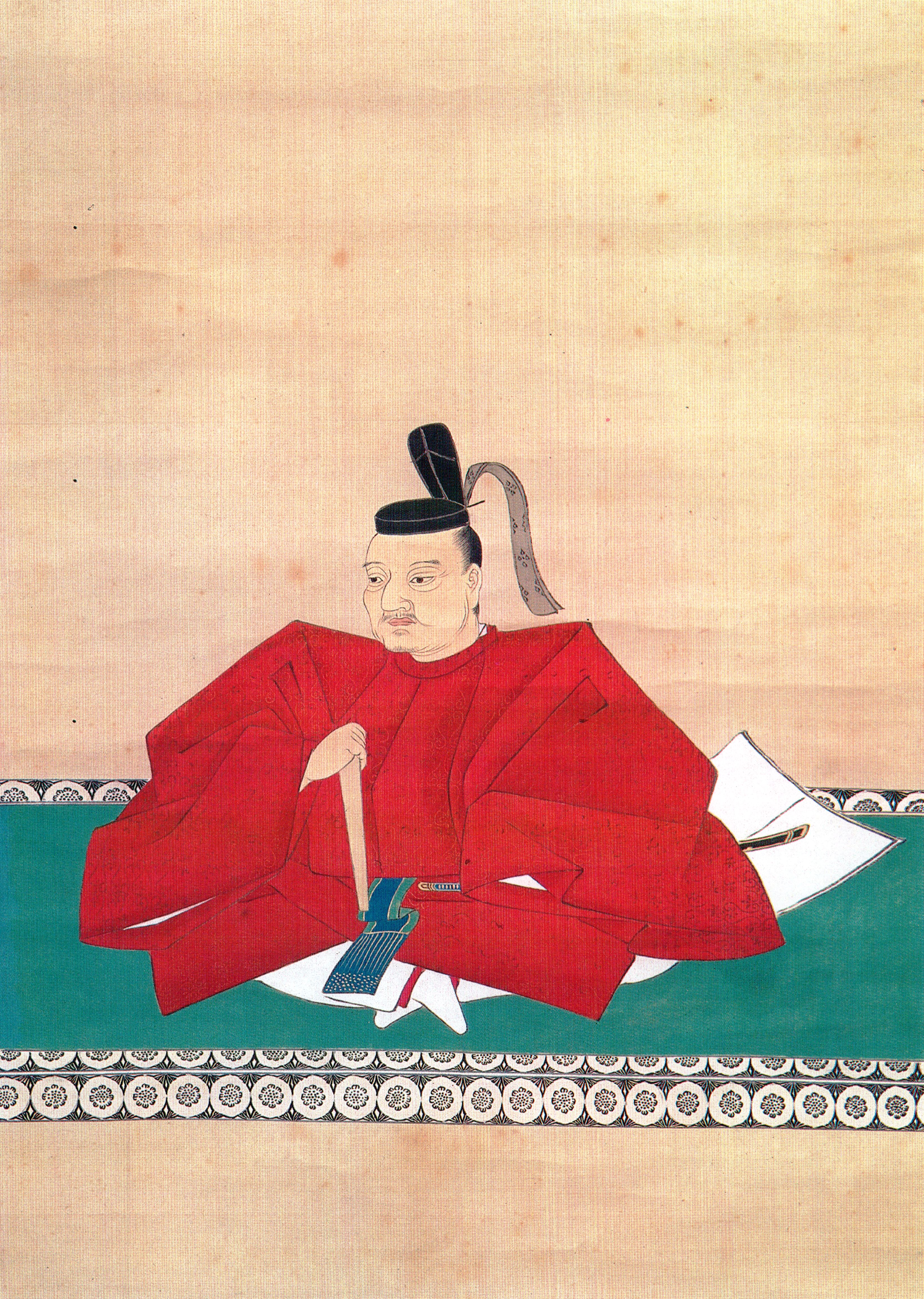
Itakura Shigemasa

Itakura Shigemasa (板倉 重昌; 1588 – February 14, 1638) was a Japanese daimyō of the early Edo period. The lord of Fukōzu han in Mikawa Province, he was a personal aide to Tokugawa Ieyasu. Son of the Kyoto Shoshidai Itakura Katsushige, and younger brother of Itakura Shigemune (successor to Katsushige as Shoshidai).

Born in Mikawa, he was styled Naizen no Kami (内膳正), and together with Matsudaira Masatsuna and Akimoto Yasutomo, he served as Tokugawa Ieyasu's personal aide (kinju shuttōnin 近習出頭人). In the Osaka Winter Campaign, he acted as negotiator with the Toyotomi.

In the 11th month of Kan'ei 14 (1637), he was appointed chief commander of the expeditionary force that was sent to put down the Shimabara Rebellion. Shigemasa failed to take Hara Castle, the rebels' headquarters, despite his use of ninja, tunnelling methods, and catapults. As a result, the shōgun Iemitsu grew impatient with him, and sent Matsudaira Nobutsuna as his replacement. In an effort to regain his credibility, Shigemasa led a sudden assault on the castle, but in the process, was shot dead by an arrow.

Shigemasa's death poem was:

- Aratama no/toshi no hajime ni/saku hana no/na nominokoraba/saki ga ketoshire

Translated,

- At the start of the year/of the blooming flowers/if only the name remains/know that it bloomed before all others

Preceded by Matsudaira Tadatoshi	Daimyō of Fukōzu; 1624–1638	Succeeded by Itakura Shigenori
