= Kasama Castle =

Fortification primarily active in Edo period, Japan

Coordinates: 36°22′56.95″N 140°16′2.93″E

Kasama Castle 笠間城
- Kasama, Ibaraki Prefecture, Japan
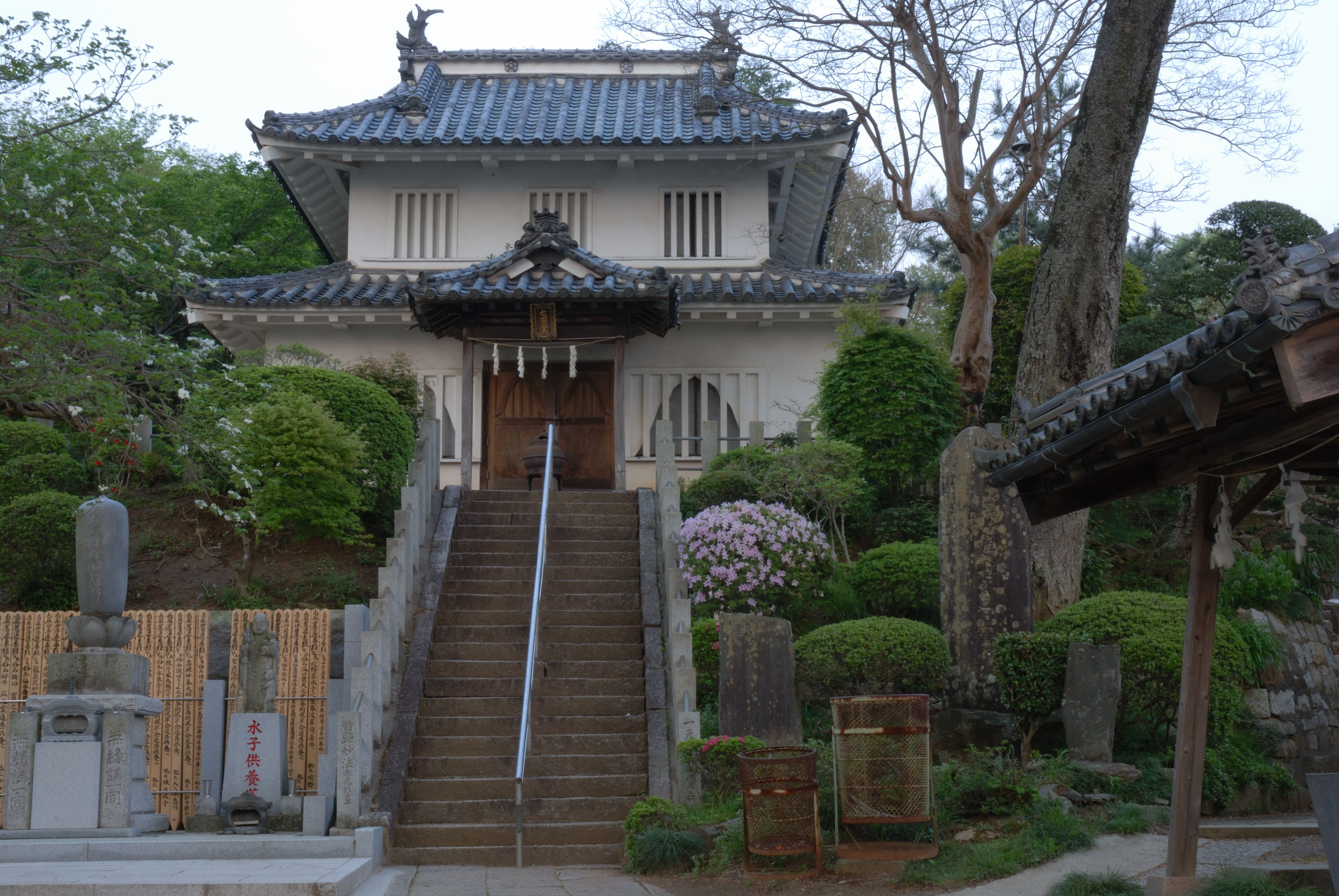
- Reconstructed Hachimandai Yagura of Kasama Castle

Site information
- Type: mountain-style Japanese castle
- Open to the public: yes

Location

Site history
- Built: 1219
- Built by: Kasama Tomonari
- In use: Edo period
- Demolished: 1868

Kasama Castle (笠間城, Kasama-jō) is a Japanese castle located in Kasama, central Ibaraki Prefecture, Japan. At the end of the Edo period, Kasama Castle was home to a junior branch of Makino clan, daimyō of Kasama Domain, but castle and domain went through many changes in clans during the early Edo period.

== History ==
In 1205, a retainer of Utsunomiya Yoritsuna, Shioya Tomonari, moved to this area and changed his name to “Kasama”. The original Kasama Castle was completed in 1235, but little is known of the Kasama clan during the Kamakura period and subsequent Muromachi period. However, in 1591, Kasama Tsunaie refused the summons of his overlord, the Utsunomiya, to join his forces against the Later Hōjō clan at the Battle of Odawara and was dispossessed of his castle. A retainer of the Utsunomiya, Tamanyu Katsumasa initially replaced the Kasama, but in 1598 the castle was taken by Gamo Satonari as part of a 30,000 koku domain. He made many modifications to modernize its layout. Following the Battle of Sekigahara, Tokugawa Ieyasu assigned the castle to Matsudaira Yasushige in 1601.

As the headquarters of Kasama Domain under the Tokugawa shogunate, the castle was passed to the Ogasawara clan, Toda-Matsudaira clan, Nagai clan, Asano clan, Inoue clan, Honjo clan, Inoue clan (again), before coming into the hands of the Makino clan in 1747, who subsequently remained in residence at Kasama until the Meiji Restoration.

== The castle ==
Kasama Castle is rare among the Sengoku Period mountaintop castles because it lasted through the Edo Period without being abandoned, moved or entirely rebuilt. The castle consisted of Main and donjon enclosure on the two adjacent peaks of Mount Sashiro, and with the Second and Third enclosure at the foot of the mountain. The extensive use of stonework is also unusual for the Kantō region

Little remains of the castle today except for some stonework, one reconstructed yagura turret & two reconstructed gates.

== Literature ==
- Schmorleitz, Morton S. (1974). Castles in Japan. Tokyo: Charles E. Tuttle Co. pp. 144–145. ISBN 0-8048-1102-4.
- Motoo, Hinago (1986). Japanese Castles. Tokyo: Kodansha. p. 200 pages. ISBN 0-87011-766-1.
- Mitchelhill, Jennifer (2004). Castles of the Samurai: Power and Beauty. Tokyo: Kodansha. p. 112 pages. ISBN 4-7700-2954-3.
- Turnbull, Stephen (2003). Japanese Castles 1540-1640. Osprey Publishing. p. 64 pages. ISBN 1-84176-429-9.
