= Sadanaga =

Sadanaga (written: 貞永) is a Japanese surname. Notable people with the surname include:

- Nobuyoshi Sadanaga (貞永 信義, 1929–2003), Japanese long-distance runner

Sadanaga (written: 貞長) is also a masculine Japanese given name. Notable people with the name include:

- Makino Sadanaga (牧野 貞長, 1733–1796), Japanese daimyō
