= Itakura Katsushige =

Japanese daimyo (1545–1624)

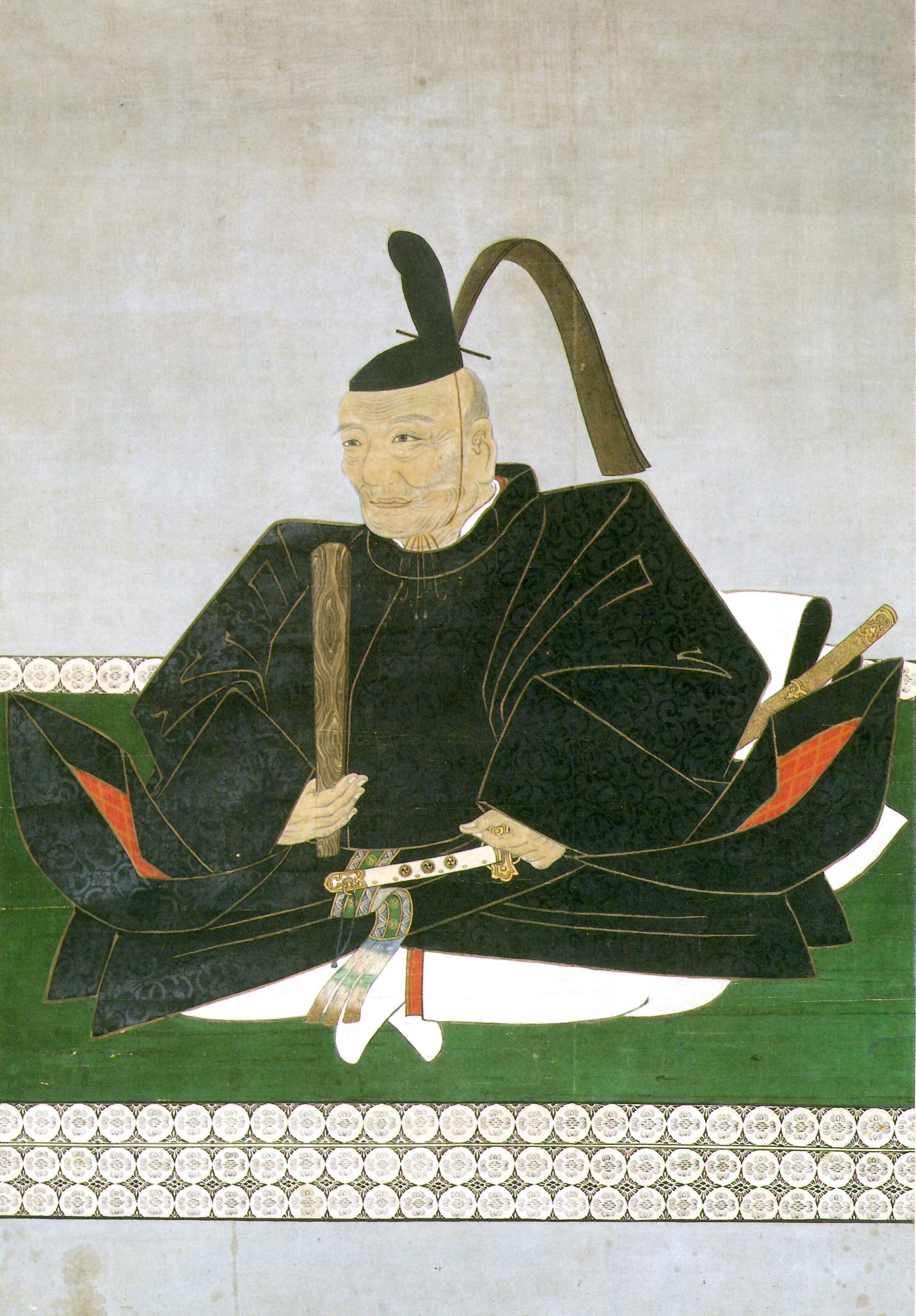

2nd Kyoto Shoshidai
- In office 1601–1619
- Preceded by: Okudaira Nobumasa
- Succeeded by: Itakura Shigemune

Personal details
- Born: 1545
- Died: June 14, 1624 (aged 78–79)

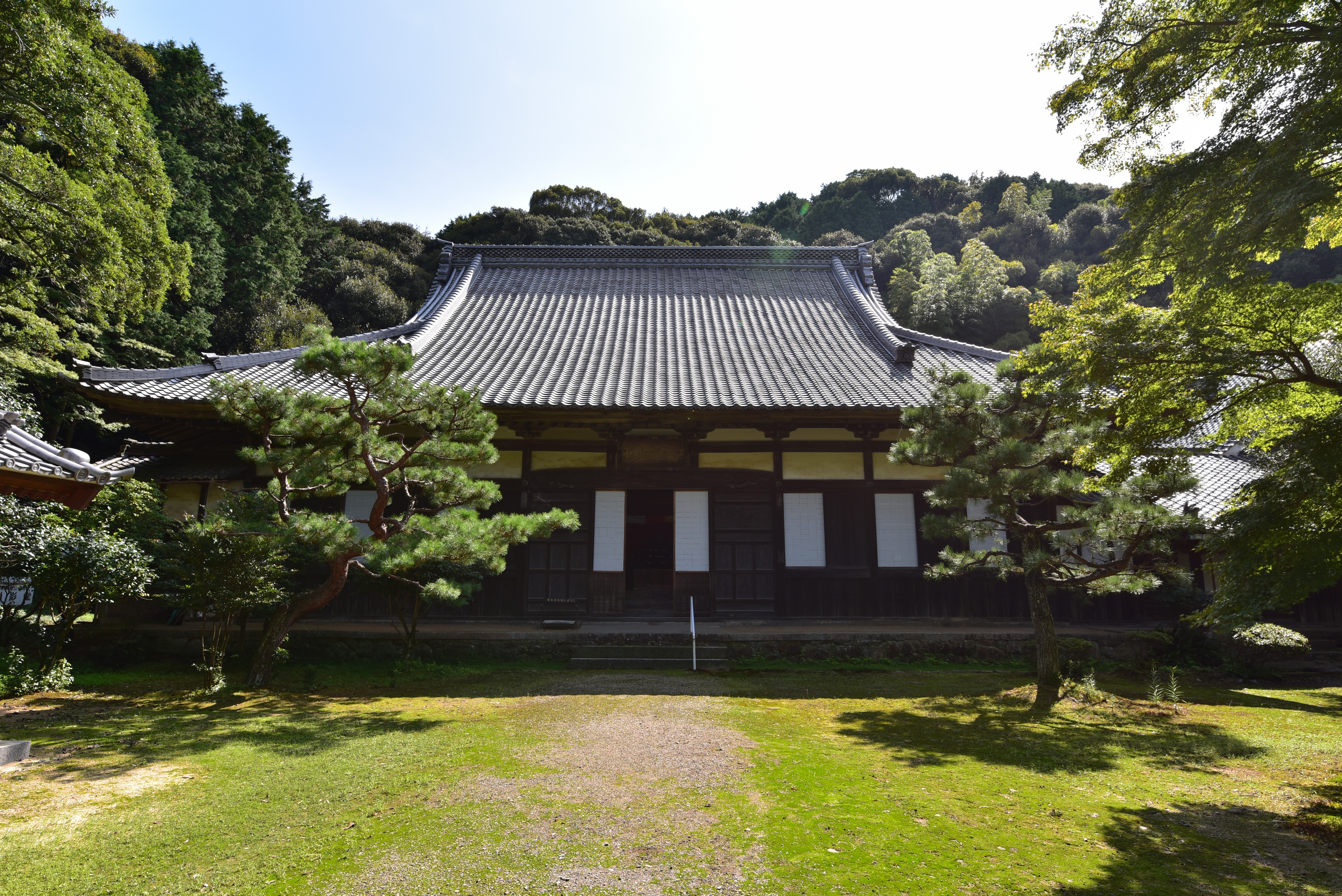
Itakura Katsushige's family temple, Choen-ji(Nishio, Aichi Prefecture)

Itakura Katsushige (板倉 勝重; 1545 – June 14, 1624) was a Japanese daimyō of the Azuchi–Momoyama Period to early Edo period. He fought at the side of Tokugawa Ieyasu at the Battle of Sekigahara in 1600. He was also an ordained Shin Buddhist priest.

Katsuhige's daimyō family claimed descent from the Shibukawa branch of the Seiwa Genji. The Itakura identified its clan origins in Mikawa Province, and the descendants of Katsuhige were considered the elder branch of the clan.

Katsuhige was sometimes identified by his title, Iga-no kami.

He served in the Tokugawa shogunate as the second Kyoto Shoshidai, holding office in the period spanning the years from 1601 through 1620. In addition to administrative duties, the shoshidai's participation in ceremonial events served a function in consolidating the power and influence of the shogunate. For example, in September 1617, a Korean delegation was received by Hidetada at Fushimi Castle, and Katsuhige was summoned for two reasons (1) for the Koreans, to underscore the importance accorded the embassy, and (2) for the kuge courtiers in attendance, to make sure that they were properly impressed.

Katsushige was succeeded in this role by his eldest son, Shigemune, who held the office from 1620 through 1654. The merit earned by Katsushigu and Shigemune was remembered years later when devastation of the Itakura family was threatened by the otherwise unpardonable actions of a descendant.

He was unusual in that he was one of the "new men" in the close service of Tokugawa Ieyasu. After the Siege of Osaka, Katsushige was entrusted with enforcing the newly promulgated Kuge Shohatto code of conduct for court nobles. He was the senior shogunate official overseeing the completion of Nijō Castle's construction in 1603.

His grave is at Chōen-ji Temple, in modern-day Nishio, Aichi.

== Family ==
- Father: Itakura Yoshishige
- Mother: Honda Mitsutsugu’s daughter
- Wife: Ao Nagakatsu’s daughter
- Children:
  - Itakura Shigemune by Ao Nagakatsu’s daughter
  - Itakura Shigemasa by Ao Nagakatsu’s daughter
  - Itakura Shigeo
  - daughter married Toda Mitsumasa
  - daughter married Kawamura Shigehisa
  - Maki Kodayu
  - daughter married Ando Shigeyoshi

== Notes ==
Preceded by Okudaira Nobumasa	2nd Kyoto Shoshidai; 1601–1619	Succeeded by Itakura Shigemune
