= Sekiyado Castle =

Castle in Noda, Chiba Prefecture, Japan

Coordinates: 36°05′48.34″N 139°46′48.61″E

Sekiyado Castle 関宿城
- Noda, Chiba Prefecture, Japan
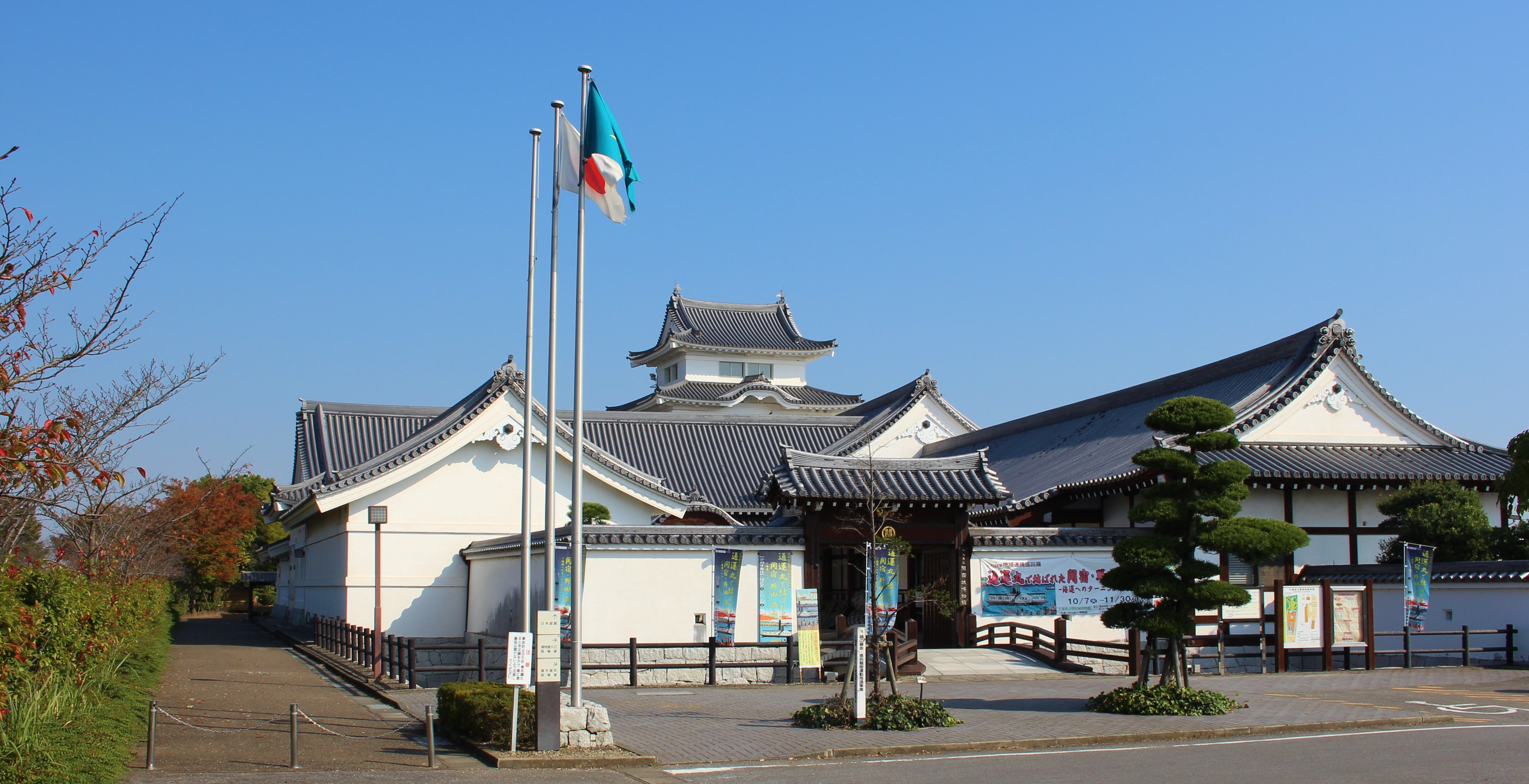
- Reconstructed Main Keep of Sekiyado Castle

Site information
- Type: flatland-style Japanese castle
- Owner: reconstructed 1995
- Open to the public: yes

Location

Site history
- Built: 1590
- Built by: Matsudaira Yasumoto
- In use: Edo period
- Demolished: 1875

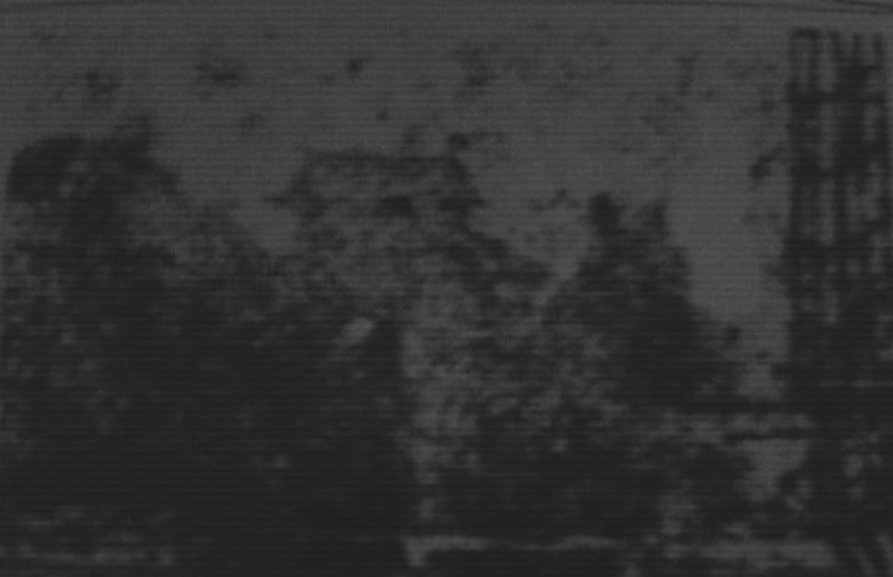
Sekiyado Castle circa 1870

Sekiyado Castle (関宿城, Sekiyado-jō) is a Japanese castle located in Noda, northwestern Chiba Prefecture, Japan. At the end of the Edo period, Sekiyado Castle was home to the Kuse clan, daimyō of Sekiyado Domain.

== History ==
Sekiyado is located at the diffluence of the Tone River and the Edogawa River, and was thus a strategic location controlling river traffic in the northern Kantō region, as well as the northeastern approaches to Edo. A fortification was built on this location in the early Muromachi period by either Yadoya Mitsusuke (1395-1438) or Yadoya Shigesuke (d. 1512). It was destroyed during a campaign by the Later Hōjō clan of Odawara to conquer the Kantō region from 1565 to 1574.

After the Hōjō clan were defeated in the Battle of Odawara, they were supplanted by Tokugawa Ieyasu. The castle was reconstructed by Matsudaira Yasumoto in 1590.

Under the Tokugawa Shogunate, the course of the Tone River was diverted in 1654 to prevent flooding in Edo. The new mouth of the Tone River was moved from Edo Bay to north of the Bōsō Peninsula, which greatly hindered river transportation. The daimyō of Sekiyado Domain, Itakura Shigetsune, took advantage of this situation to construct a canal joining the Tone River with the Edogawa River at Sekiyado, which greatly shortened the voyage and enhanced the revenues of his domain.

When the castle was reconstructed in 1671, the new donjon was constructed as a copy of the three-story Fujimi Yagura of Edo Castle.

With the Meiji Restoration, the new Meiji government ordered the destruction of all former feudal fortifications. The outer buildings of the castle had already been lost in a fire in 1870, and the remaining structures were abandoned in compliance with this directive in 1872, and pulled down by 1875.

The current donjon was reconstructed in 1995 to boost local tourism and to function as an annex to the local Sekiyado Castle Museum. However, the reconstructed buildings are not on the original foundations, nor are the buildings historically accurate, as they have been modeled on “typical” examples from other castles.

== Literature ==
- Schmorleitz, Morton S. (1974). Castles in Japan. Tokyo: Charles E. Tuttle Co. pp. 144–145. ISBN 0-8048-1102-4.
- Motoo, Hinago (1986). Japanese Castles. Tokyo: Kodansha. p. 200 pages. ISBN 0-87011-766-1.
- Mitchelhill, Jennifer (2004). Castles of the Samurai: Power and Beauty. Tokyo: Kodansha. p. 112 pages. ISBN 4-7700-2954-3.
- Turnbull, Stephen (2003). Japanese Castles 1540-1640. Osprey Publishing. p. 64 pages. ISBN 1-84176-429-9.
