= Kasama Domain =

Feudal domain in Edo period Japan

Kasama Domain 笠間藩
- under Tokugawa shogunate Japan
- 1601–1871
- Capital: Kasama Castle
  - Type: Daimyō
- Historical era: Edo period
  - Established: 1601
  - Disestablished: 1871
- Today part of: part of Ibaraki Prefecture

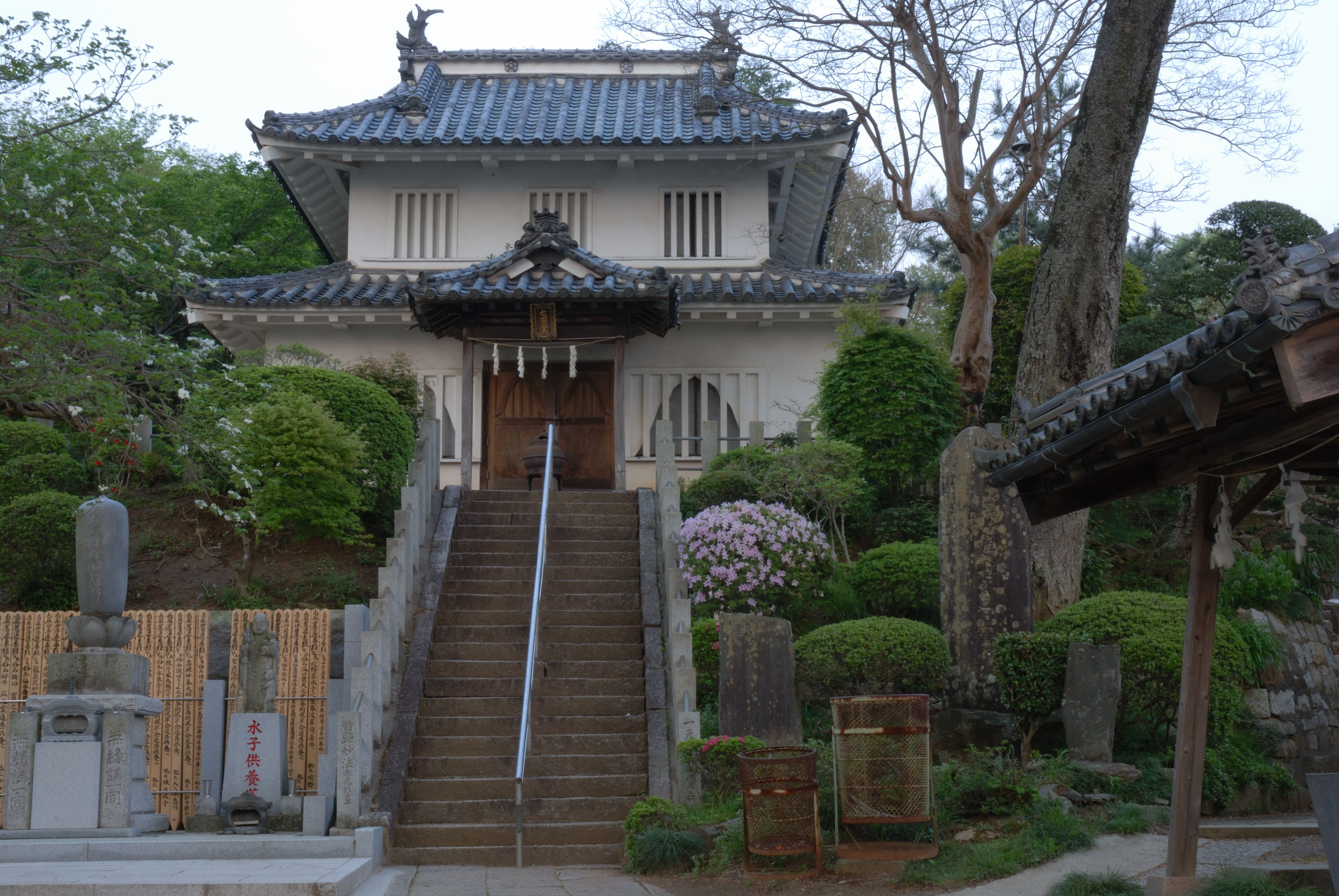
A reconstructed corner tower of Kasama Castle

Kasama Domain (笠間藩, Kasama-han) was a feudal domain under the Tokugawa shogunate of Edo period Japan, located in Hitachi Province (modern-day Ibaraki Prefecture), Japan. It was centered on Kasama Castle in what is now the city of Kasama, Ibaraki. It was ruled by a number of clans during its early history, before settling under the rule of a junior branch of the Makino clan from the middle of the Edo period onward.

== History ==
Kasama Castle was originally the stronghold of the Kasama clan, who ruled the region since the Kamakura period. However, the Kasama were destroyed by Toyotomi Hideyoshi for supporting the Odawara Hōjō, and their lands were given to the Utsunomiya clan, and subsequently to Gamo Hideyuki in 1598. Following the Battle of Sekigahara, Matsudaira Yasushige was promoted to 30,000 koku from his previous holding of Kisai Domain and was given the newly created Kasama Doman in 1601. However, he was transferred on to Shinoyama Domain in Tamba Province a few years later in 1608. He was replaced at Kasama by Ogasawara Yoshitsugu, who was then relieved of the domain less than a year later due to financial improprieties.

Kasama was revived in 1612 for Matsudaira Yasunaga, the former castellan of Fushimi Castle. He held the domain until his promotion to Takasaki Domain in 1616 for services rendered during the Siege of Osaka. He was replaced by Nagai Naokatsu, one of Tokugawa Ieyasu’s oldest retainers, until 1622.

Kasama then came under the control of Asano Nagashige, followed by his son, Asano Nagano, until the transfer of the Asano clan to Ako Domain in 1645. The Asano were followed by a junior branch of the Inoue clan from 1645 to 1692, followed by the Honjō Matsudaira clan from 1692 to 1702. The Inoue returned to Kasama in 1702, ruling for three generations until 1747. In 1757, Makino Sadamichi, the Kyoto shoshidai and daimyō of Nabeoka Domain in Hyuga Province was transferred to Kasama, which his descendants then held until the Meiji restoration. Under the Makino, the domain became noted for Makino ware, a type of ceramics, as well as for its numerous schools of Japanese swordsmanship, especially that of Jigen-ryū and Yuishin-Ittoryu. The domain also made efforts towards the opening of new rice lands and development of fertilizers to raise yields, as the expenses of the Makino lords was very great due to the numerous offices they held within the shogunal administration. The domain sided with the Imperial forces during the Boshin War and participated in the Battle of Aizu.

The domain had a 360 samurai households resident at Kasama Castle per a census in the Bunsei era as opposed to 348 households of townspeople.

== Holdings at the end of the Edo period ==
As with most domains in the han system, Kasama Domain consisted of several discontinuous territories calculated to provide the assigned kokudaka, based on periodic cadastral surveys and projected agricultural yields.

- Hitachi Province
  - 84 villages in Ibaraki District
  - 2 villages in Shida District
- Mutsu Province (Iwashiro Province)
  - 5 villages in Ishikawa District
- Mutsu Province (Iwashiro Province)
  - 14 villages in Tamura District
  - 12 villages in Iwaseki District
  - 30 villages in Iwaki District

== List of daimyō ==
#	Name	Tenure	Courtesy title	Court Rank	kokudaka
Matsui-Matsudaira clan (fudai) 1601–1608
1	Matsudaira Yasushige (松平 康重)	1601–1608	Suo-no-kami (周防守)	Lower 4th (従四位下)	30,000 koku
Ogasawara clan (fudai) 1608–1609
1	Ogasawara Yoshitsugu (小笠原 吉次)	1608–1609	Izumi-no-kami (和泉守)	Lower 5th (従五位下)	30,000 koku
	tenryō	1609–1612			
Toda-Matsudaira clan (fudai) 1612–1616
1	Matsudaira Yasunaga (松平 康長)	1612–1616	Tango-no-kami (丹後守)	Lower 4th (従四位下)	30,000 koku
Nagai clan (fudai) 1617–1622
1	Nagai Naokatsu (永井 直勝)	1617–1622	Ukon-no-taifu (右近大夫)	Lower 5th (従五位下)	32,000 => 52,000 koku
Asano clan (tozama) 1622–1645
1	Asano Nagashige (浅野 長重)	1622–1632	Uneme-no-kami (采女正)	Lower 4th (従四位下)	53,000 koku
2	Asano Naganao (浅野 長直)	1632–1645	Takumi-no-kami (内匠頭)	Lower 5th (従五位下)	53,000 koku
Inoue clan (fudai) 1645–1692
1	Inoue Masatoshi (井上 正利)	1645–1675	Kawachi-no-kami (河内守)	Lower 5th (従五位下)	50,000 koku
2	Inoue Masato (井上 正任)	1669–1692	Nakatsukasa-no-shoyu (中務少輔)	Lower 5th (従五位下)	50,000 koku
Honjo clan (fudai) 1692–1702
1	Honjo Munesuke (本庄 宗資)	1692–1699	Inaba-no-kami (因幡守)	Lower 4th (従四位下)	40,000 koku
2	Matsudaira Suketoshi (松平 資俊)	1699–1702	Hoki-no-kami (伯耆守)	Lower 4th (従四位下)	40,000 koku
Inoue clan (fudai) 1702–1747
1	Inoue Masamine (井上 正岑)	1702–1722	Kawachi-no-kami (河内守); Jiju (侍従)	Lower 4th (従四位下)	50,000 ->60,000 koku
2	Inoue Masayuki (井上 正之)	1722–1737	Kawachi-no-kami (河内守)	Lower 5th (従五位下)	60,000 koku
3	Inoue Masatune (井上 正経)	1737–1747	Kawachi-no-kami (河内守); Jiju (侍従)	Lower 4th (従四位下)	60,000 koku
Makino clan (fudai) 1747–1871
1	Makino Sadamichi (牧野 貞通)	1747–1749	Bingo-no-kami (備後守); Jiju (侍従)	Lower 4th (従四位下)	80,000 koku
2	Makino Sadanaga (牧野 貞長)	1749–1796	Bingo-no-kami (備後守); Jiju (侍従)	Lower 4th (従四位下)	80,000 koku
3	Makino Sadaharu (牧野 貞喜)	1792–1817	Etchu-no-kami (越中守)	Lower 5th (従五位下)	80,000 koku
4	Makino Sadamoto (牧野 貞幹)	1817–1828	Etchu-no-kami (越中守)	Lower 5th (従五位下)	80,000 koku
5	Makino Sadakatsu (牧野 貞一)	1828–1840	Etchu-no-kami (越中守)	Lower 5th (従五位下)	80,000 koku
6	Makino Sadanori (牧野 貞勝)	1840–1841	-none-	-none-	80,000 koku
7	Makino Sadahisa (牧野 貞久)	1841–1850	Etchu-no-kami (越中守)	Lower 5th (従五位下)	80,000 koku
8	Makino Sadanao (牧野 貞直)	1851–1868	Etchu-no-kami (越中守)	Lower 4th (従四位下)	80,000 koku
9	Makino Sadayasu (牧野 貞寧)	1868–1871	-none-	Lower 5th (従五位下)	80,000 koku
