= Makino Chikashige =

Makino Chikashige (牧野 親成; 1607 – October 19, 1677) was a Japanese daimyō of the early Edo period. He was also known by his title, Sado no kami—Makino Sado no kami Chiashige. He was the son of Makino Takumi no kami Nobushige.

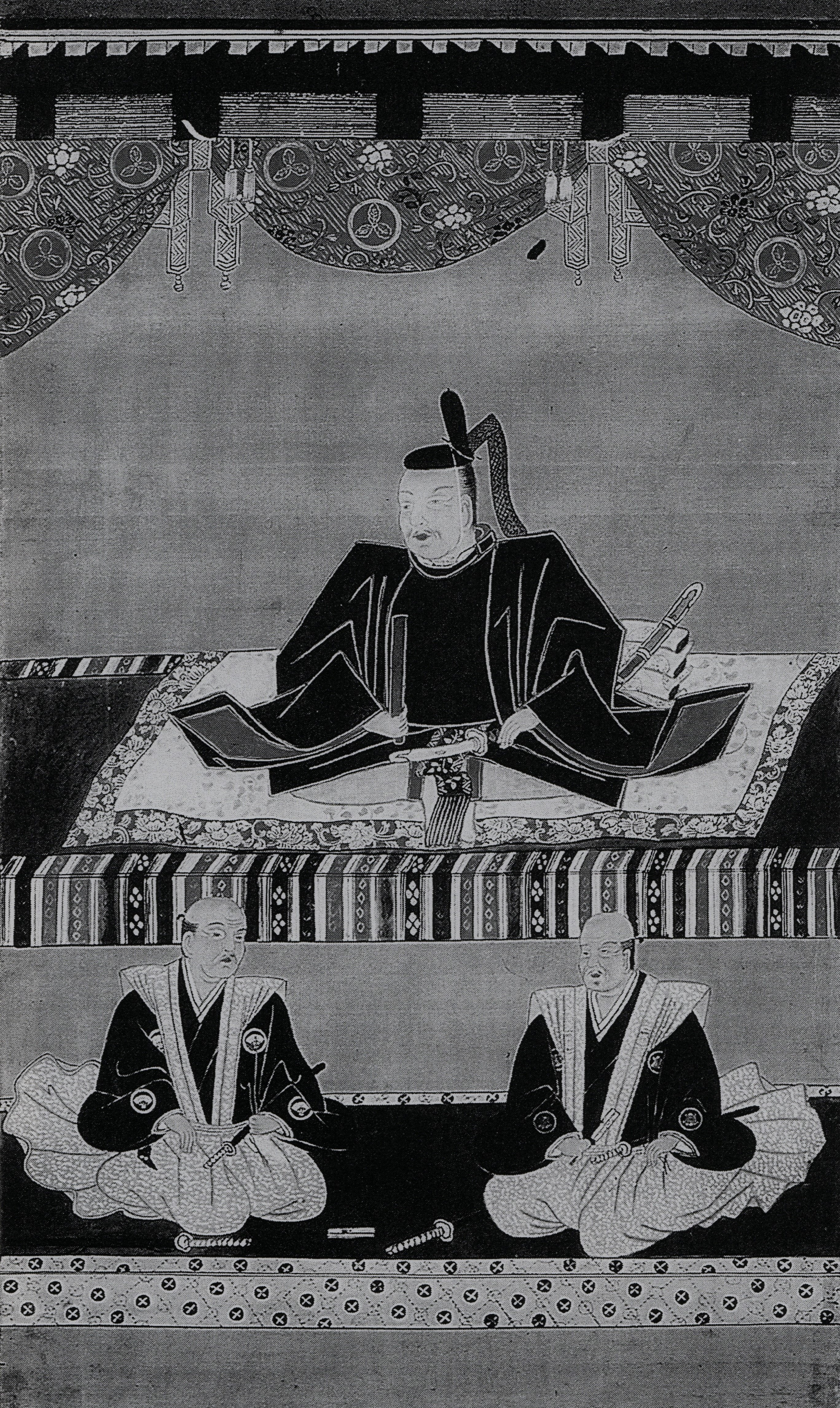

The Makino were identified as one of the fudai or insider daimyō clans which were hereditary vassals or allies of the Tokugawa clan, in contrast with the tozama or outsider clans.

== Makino clan genealogy ==
The fudai Makino clan originated in 16th century Mikawa Province. Their elevation in status by Toyotomi Hideyoshi dates from 1588. They claim descent from Takechiuchi no Sukune, who was a legendary Statesman and lover of the legendary Empress Jingū.

Chikashige was part of a cadet branch of the Makino which was created in 1633. The Makino were installed at Sekiyado Domain in Shimōsa Province in 1644. From 1668 through the Meiji Restoration, the descendants had holdings at Tanabe Domain (35,000 koku) in Tango Province. Descendants lived from 1634 through 1868 at Mineyama Domain (11,000 koku) in Echigo Province.

The head of this clan line was ennobled as a "Viscount" in the Meiji period.

== Tokugawa official ==
As a youth, Chikashige had joined the household of Tokugawa Iemitsu as a page. In 1633, he had advanced to become gozenban, the official who served the shōgun his meals. In 1642, he advanced further to become goshoinban, a captain in Iemitsu's bodyguard.

Before his promotion in income to the level of daimyo, Chikashige was a high-ranking hatamoto.

He served the Tokugawa shogunate as its third Kyoto shoshidai in the period spanning January 5, 1655, through July 2, 1668. As shoshidai, he was actively and personally engaged as the head of a network of spies tasked to discover and report any covert sources of sedition, insurrection or other kinds of unrest. Retiring in 1673, he died four years later.

== Notes ==
Preceded by Makino Nobushige	Lord of Sekiyado; 1647–1656	Succeeded by Itakura Shigemune
Preceded by Kyōgoku Takamori	Lord of Tanabe; 1668–1673	Succeeded by Makino Tomishige
Preceded by Itakura Shigemune	4th Kyoto Shoshidai; 1654–1668	Succeeded by Itakura Shigenori
