= Kuze Hirochika =

Japanese daimyō

Daimyō of Sekiyado
- In office 1830–1862
- Preceded by: Kuze Hirotaka
- Succeeded by: Kuze Hirofumi

Personal details
- Born: 1819 Edo, Japan
- Died: July 28, 1864 (aged 44–45)

Kuze Hirochika (久世 広周; 1819 – July 28, 1864)

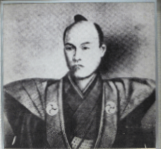

was a Japanese daimyō of the late Edo period, who ruled the Sekiyado Domain. He served as a rōjū in the Tokugawa shogunate, and briefly as chief rōjū (rōjū shuza 老中首座).

== Family ==
- Father: Okusa Takayoshi (d.1840)
- Foster Father: Kuze Hirotaka (1799–1830)
- Wife: Abe Masakiyo's daughter
- Children:
  - Kuze Hirofumi (1854–1899)
  - Kuze Hironari (1858–1911)
  - Kuze Hiromitsu
  - daughter married Sakurai Tomoyoshi

Preceded by Kuze Hirotaka	Daimyō of Sekiyado; 1830–1862	Succeeded by Kuze Hirofumi
