= Itakura Shigenori =

Japanese daimyo (1617–1673)

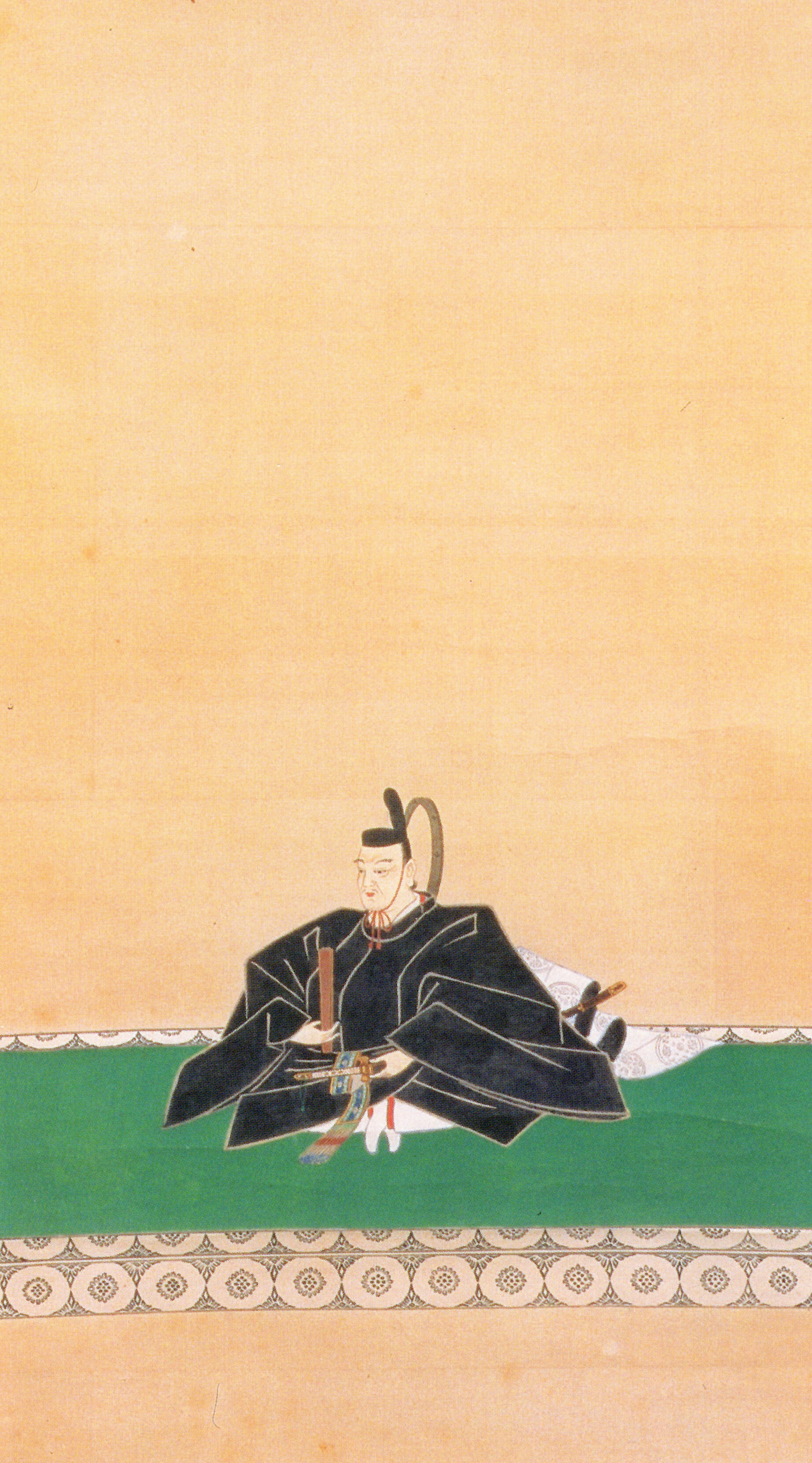

2nd (Itakura) Lord of Fukōzu
- In office 1639–1639
- Preceded by: Itakura Shigemasa
- Succeeded by: none

1st Lord of Mikawa-Nakajima
- In office 1639–1672
- Preceded by: none
- Succeeded by: none

1st (Itakura) Lord of Karasuyama
- In office 1672–1673
- Preceded by: Hori Chikamasa
- Succeeded by: Itakura Shigetane

5th Kyoto Shoshidai
- In office 1668–1670
- Preceded by: Makino Chikashige
- Succeeded by: Nagai Naotsune

Personal details
- Born: 1617
- Died: July 13, 1673 (aged 55–56)

Itakura Shigenori (板倉 重矩; November 22, 1617 – July 13, 1673) was a Japanese daimyō of the early Edo period. Shigenori's daimyō family claimed descent from the Shibukawa branch of the Seiwa Genji. The Itakura identified its clan origins in Mikawa Province, and the progeny of Katsuhige (1542–1624), including the descendants of his second son Shigemasa (1588–1638), were known as the elder branch of the clan. Katsuhige was Shingeori's grandfather; and Shigenori was the eldest son of Shigemasa.

Shigenori's youth was spent in Mikawa province. In 1615, Shigenori's father was granted yearly revenues from Mikawa in honor of his warrior conduct during the siege of Osaka.

== Career of shogunate service ==
Shigenori was made governor of Osaka Castle and then rōjū. He served for a time as rōjū (1665–1668), and then he left Edo for Kyoto.

He served as the shōgun's representative in the capital as the fourth Kyoto shoshidai in the period which spanned July 19, 1668 through April 3, 1670. He returned to Edo for a second term as rōjū (1670–1673). His service to the Tokugawa shogunate was serially rewarded in Fukōzu and Mikawa-Nakajima. In 1672, he was made daimyō of Karasuyama in Shimotsuke Province.

His grandfather was the second shoshidai and his uncle was the third shoshidai. Shigenori followed their examples by joining his father as part of the shogunate's army during the Shimabara Rebellion.

== Notes ==
Preceded by Itakura Shigemasa	2nd Lord of Fukōzu; 1639	Succeeded by none
Preceded by none	1st Lord of Mikawa-Nakajima; 1639–1672	Succeeded by none
Preceded by Hori Chikamasa	1st Lord of Karasuyama; 1672–1673	Succeeded by Itakura Shigetane
Preceded by Makino Chikashige	5th Kyoto Shoshidai; 1668–1670	Succeeded by Nagai Naotsune
