= Kiyo Makino =

Japanese educator

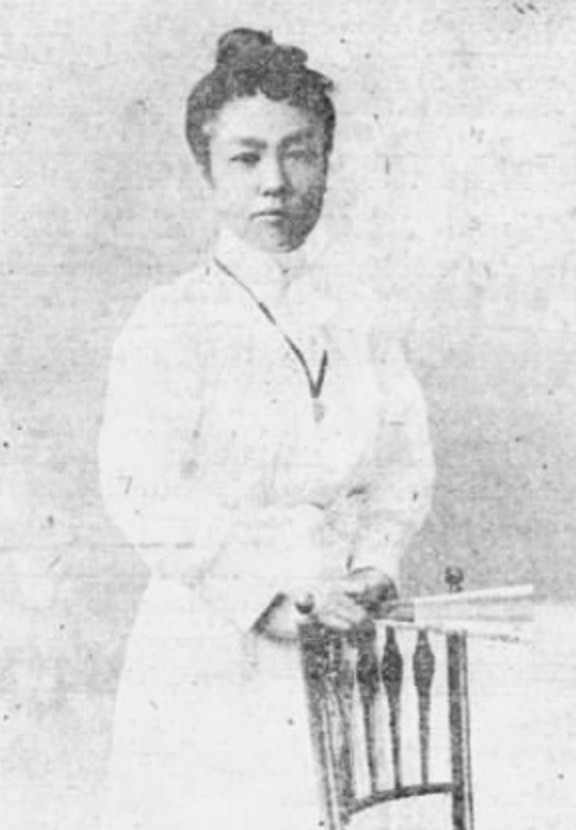
- Kiyo Makino, from a 1901 Boston newspaper
- Born: 21 June 1875; Japan
- Died: after 1911
- Other names: Kiyoko Makino
- Occupation: Educator

Kiyo Makino (born 21 June 1875) was a Japanese educator. From 1902 to 1905, she was the first international woman student at the Massachusetts Institute of Technology.

== Early life and education ==
Makino trained for a teaching career at a normal school in Tokyo. She traveled to Seattle in 1899, studied English in Northfield, Massachusetts for a year, and was a special student at Massachusetts Institute of Technology (MIT) from 1902 to 1905, studying biology and microscopy. She is acknowledged as the first international woman student at MIT.

Makino was studying in Boston at the same time as physical educator Inokuchi Akuri, and the women were often mentioned together in news reports. She appeared in the cast of a Japanese drama, Danjuro no tanjobi, in Boston in 1904. Also in 1904, she sold her kimono to make a donation to the Japanese war effort. In 1905 she returned to Japan with Mitsu Okada, a Japanese special student at Wellesley College.

Makino, Inokuchi, and Okada were all involved with the Japanese Club of Boston, and raised money for the organization's clubhouse in 1902.

== Career ==
Makino taught school in Japan in the 1890s, and was a secretary and translator at the Boston Museum of Fine Arts while she was a student at MIT.

After her return to Japan, Makino taught at St. Margaret's School in Tokyo, St. Hilda's School, and at other girls' schools and women's colleges. She published a textbook on women's health and hygiene in 1908. She was active in Japan's temperance movement.

== Publications ==
- Women's Physiology and Hygiene (1908)
