= Itakura Shigemune =

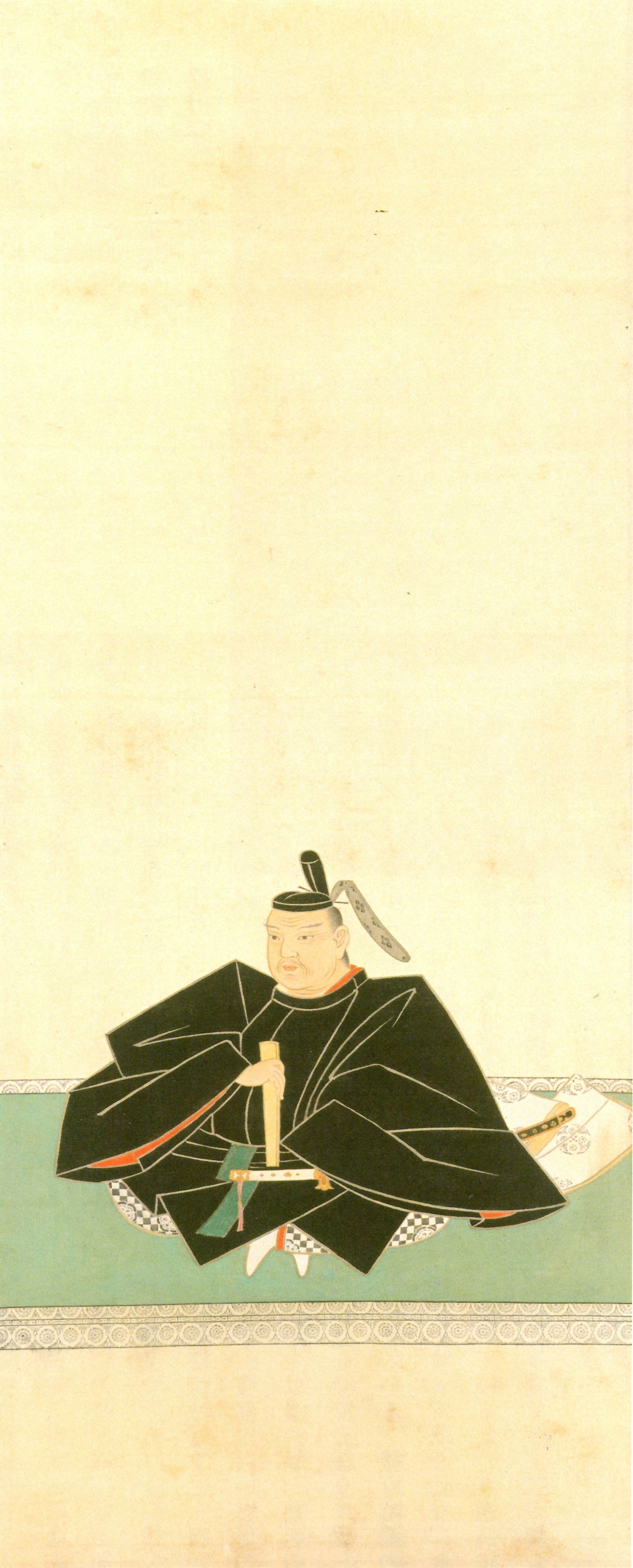

1st (Itakura) Daimyō of Sekiyado
- In office 1656–1656
- Preceded by: Makino Chikashige
- Succeeded by: Itakura Shigesato

3rd Kyoto Shoshidai
- In office 1619–1654
- Preceded by: Itakura Katsushige
- Succeeded by: Makino Chikashige

Personal details
- Born: 1586 Sunpu, Suruga Province, Japan
- Died: January 15, 1657 (aged 70–71)

Itakura Shigemune (板倉 重宗; 1586 – January 15, 1657) was a Japanese daimyō of the early Edo period. Shigemune's daimyō family claimed descent from the Shibukawa branch of the Seiwa Genji. The Itakura identified its clan origins in Mikawa Province. The descendants of Itakura Katsushige, including the descendants of his eldest son Shigemune, were known as the elder branch of the clan. In 1622, his service was rewarded by his assignment as daimyō of Sekiyado Domain. Shigemune's court title was Suō no Kami.

== Biography ==
Shigemune was the eldest son of Itakura Katsushige. He was chosen to be one of Tokugawa Ieyasu's pages at a young age, and Ieyasu is said to have liked Shigemune greatly. Shigemune took part in both the Battle of Sekigahara and the Siege of Osaka Castle. His childhood name was Jusaburo (十三郎).

In 1620, Shigemune was appointed to the position as the third Kyoto Shoshidai; and he would continue in this significant role for over 30 years (1620–1654). As shoshidai, he was actively and personally engaged as the head of a network of spies tasked to discover and report any covert sources of sedition, insurrection or other kinds of unrest.

In the subtle currents of shogunate politics, he is said to have gone to great lengths to develop a sense of impartiality in judgement. When approached with a case to judge, he would place a lantern between himself and the speaker, and busy himself with making tea, so that he would not let external appearances interfere with his sense of justice.

Shigemune was expected to guard the palace and to supervise court officials; but over time, he learned that this office was no sinecure. For example, when Emperor Go-Kōmyō took fencing lessons, Shigemune is reported to have threatened to commit suicide, and Go-Kōmyō is said to have replied, "I have never seen a military man kill himself, and the spectacle will be interesting. You had better have a platform erected in the palace grounds so that your exploit can be witnessed." Both men somehow found a way to survive this impasse.

Shigemune died at Sekiyado.

The merit earned by Shigemune's loyal service to the shogunate was remembered years later when devastation of the Itakura family was threatened by the otherwise unpardonable actions of a descendant. In 1739, Hosokawa Munetake of Higo was killed inside Edo Castle by Itakura Katsukane, and the killer was ordered to commit suicide as just punishment; however, Shōgun Yoshimune personally intervened to mitigate untoward adverse consequences for the killer's fudai family.

Shigemune's grave is at Kōetsu-ji temple, in Kyoto. He also has a grave at Chōen-ji, in Nishio, Aichi.

== Family ==
- Father: Itakura Katsushige
- Mother: Ao Nagakatsu's daughter
- Wives:
  - Naruse Masanari's daughter
  - Toda Ujikane’s daughter
- Children
  - Itakura Shigesato (1619–1662) by Toda Ujikane’s daughter
  - Itakura Shigekata (1620–1684)
  - daughter married Naitō Masakatsu
  - daughter married Honda Toshinaga
  - daughter married Ōta Sukemune
  - daughter married Endō Yoshitoshi
  - daughter married Morikawa Shigemasa
  - daughter married Matsudaira Mitsushige
  - daughter married Naitō Tadamasa
  - daughter married Matsudaira Terutsuna
  - daughter married Matsudaira Terutsuna (as 2nd wife)
  - Juko-in married Ichihashi Masanobu
  - Senshō-in married Matsudaira Sukenobu

== Notes ==
Preceded by Makino Chikashige	1st (Itakura) Daimyō of Sekiyado; 1656	Succeeded by Itakura Shigesato
Preceded by Itakura Katsushige	3rd Kyoto Shoshidai; 1619–1654	Succeeded by Makino Chikashige
