= Makino Tadahiro =

Makino Tadahiro (牧野 忠寛, October 8, 1741 – August 5, 1766) was a Japanese daimyō of the late Edo period, the 8th hereditary daimyō of Nagaoka Domain.

The Makino were identified as one of the fudai or insider daimyō clans which were hereditary vassals or allies of the Tokugawa clan, in contrast with the tozama or outsider clans.

== Makino clan branches ==
The fudai Makino clan originated in 16th century Mikawa Province. Their elevation in status by Toyotomi Hideyoshi dates from 1588. They claim descent from Takechiuchi no Sukune, who was a legendary Statesman and lover of the legendary Empress Jingū.

The senior branch was established at Tako Domain in Kōzuke Province in 1590; and in 1616, their holdings were moved to Nagamine Domain in Echigo Province. From 1618 through 1868, this branch of the Makino remained at Nagaoka Domain (74,000 koku) in Echigo Province.

Tadahiro was the 8th-generation head of this senior line of the Makino.

The head of this clan line was ennobled as a "Viscount" in the Meiji period.

== Notes ==
Preceded by Makino Tadatoshi	8th Daimyō of Nagaoka; 1755–1766	Succeeded by Makino Tadakiyo
