= Makino Tadakiyo =

Makino Tadakiyo (牧野 忠精; November 26, 1760 – August 17, 1831) was a Japanese daimyō of the late Edo period.

The Makino clan was identified as one of the fudai or insider daimyō clans, which were hereditary vassals or allies of the Tokugawa clan, in contrast to the tozama or outsider clans.

== Makino clan genealogy ==
The fudai Makino clan originated in 16th century Mikawa Province. Their elevation in status by Toyotomi Hideyoshi dates from 1588. They claim descent from Takechiuchi no Sukune, a legendary Statesman and alleged lover of the legendary Empress Jingū.

Tadakiyo was part of the senior branch of the Makino, which was established at Tako Domain in Kōzuke Province in 1590. In 1616, their holdings were moved to Nagamine Domain in Echigo Province. From 1618 through 1868, this branch of the Makino remained at Nagaoka Domain (74,000 koku) in Echigo Province.

Tadakiyo was the 9th-generation head of the main line of the Makino.

The head of this clan line was ennobled as a viscount in the Meiji period.

== Tokugawa official ==
Tadakiyo served as the Tokugawa shogunate's thirty-second Kyoto shoshidai in the period spanning January 13, 1799, through August 19, 1801.

== Notes ==
Preceded by Makino Tadahiro	9th Daimyō of Nagaoka; 1766–1831	Succeeded by Makino Tadamasa
Preceded by Hotta Masayori	32nd Kyoto Shoshidai; 1799–1801	Succeeded by Doi Toshiatsu
