= Makino Sadanaga =

Japanese daimyo (1733–1796)

Makino Sadanaga (牧野 貞長; November 21, 1733 – September 30, 1796) was a Japanese daimyō of the mid-Edo period.

The Makino were identified as one of the fudai or insider daimyō clans which were hereditary vassals or allies of the Tokugawa clan, in contrast with the tozama or outsider clans.

== Makino clan genealogy ==
The fudai Makino clan originated in 16th century Mikawa Province. Their elevation in status by Toyotomi Hideyoshi dates from 1588. They claim descent from Takenouchi no Sukune, who was a legendary Statesman and lover of the legendary Empress Jingū.

Sadanaga was part of a cadet branch of the Makino which was created in 1680. These Makino resided successively at Sekiyado Domain in Shimōsa Province in 1683; at Yoshida Domain at Mikawa Province in 1705; at Nabeoka Domain in Hyūga Province in 1712; and, from 1747 through 1868 at Kasama Domain (80,000 koku) in Hitachi Province.

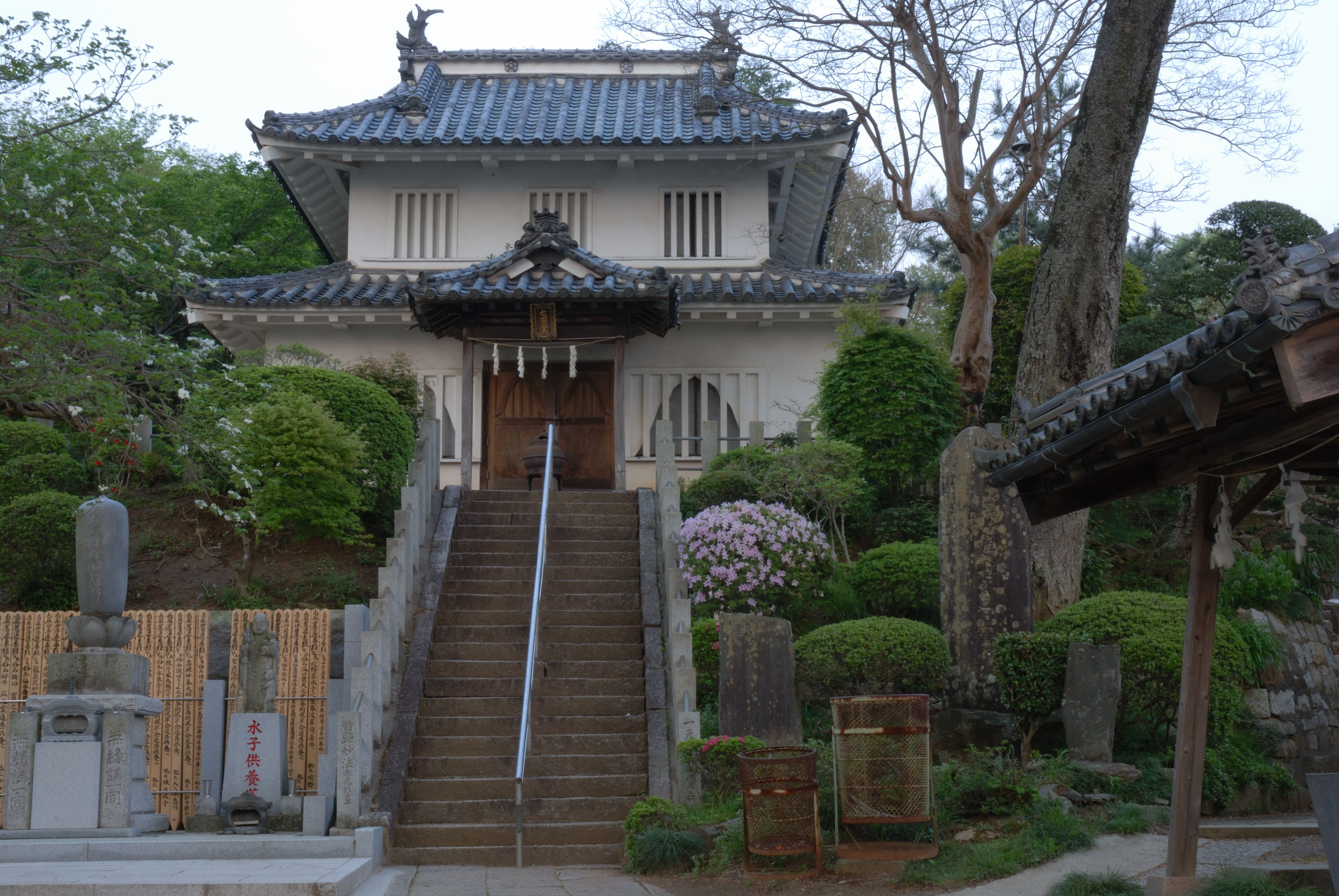
A corner tower of Kasama Castle in modern Kasama, Ibaraki

The head of this clan line was ennobled as a "Viscount" in the Meiji period.

== Tokugawa official ==
Sadanaga served the Tokugawa shogunate as its twenty-eighth Kyoto shoshidai in the period spanning July 2, 1781, though June 28, 1784. Sadanaga was the son of Makino Sadamichi (1707–1749), who was the nineteenth shoshidai. He would be distantly related to the fifty-fifth shoshidai, Makino Tadayuki (1824–1878), who was descended from the elder Makino branch.
