= Makino Narisada =

Japanese daimyō

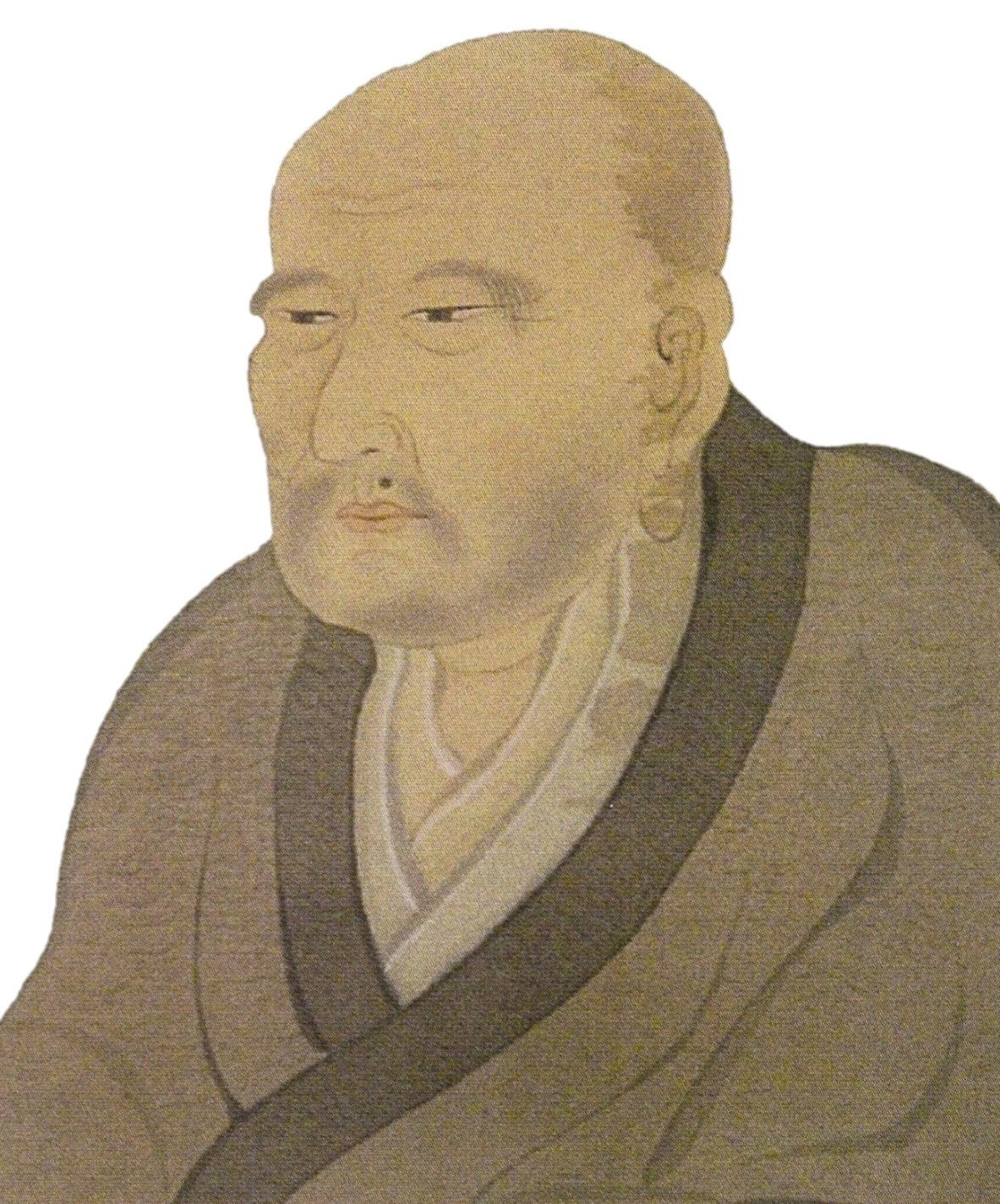
- Makino Narisada Portrait

1st Daimyō of Sekiyado
- In office 1683–1695
- Preceded by: Kuze Shigeyuki
- Succeeded by: Makino Nariharu

Personal details
- Born: Edo, Japan
- Died: July 8, 1712
- Spouse: Ōto Aguri

Makino Narisada (牧野 成貞; 1634 – July 8, 1712) was a Japanese daimyō of the mid-Edo period, who ruled the Sekiyado Domain. Starting from relatively humble origins, he first became the karō of the Tatebayashi Domain, before following his lord Tokugawa Tsunayoshi to Edo upon Tsunayoshi's selection to be 5th shōgun. In the Tokugawa shogunate, he served as Tsunayoshi's personal aide.

Narisada became a daimyo in 1680 upon receiving dispersed holdings in Hitachi Province amounting to 13,000 koku. He was then given an increase in income to 20,000 koku, before being moved to the Sekiyado Domain, which was worth 53,000 koku. With the later addition of other landholdings, his income increased yet again to 73,000 koku. His daughter, Yasuko become Tokugawa Tsunayoshi's concubine and give birth to Tsunayoshi's second and favourite son, Chomatsu. But it did not last long since Yasuko died after giving birth to Chomatsu and Chomatsu died 2 years after his mother's death. With that Narisada lost Tsunayoshi's favour.

Preceded by Kuze Shigeyuki	1st (Makino) Daimyō of Sekiyado; 1683–1695	Succeeded by Makino Nariharu
