= Makino Station =

Makino Station is the name of two train stations in Japan:

- Makino Station (Shiga) on the JR West Kosei Line in Makino, Takashima, Shiga Prefecture (Japanese: マキノ駅).
- Makino Station (Osaka) on the Keihan Electric Railway Keihan Main Line in Hirakata, Osaka Prefecture (Japanese: 牧野駅).
