= Shozo Makino =

Shozo Makino may refer to:

- Shōzō Makino (director)
- Shozo Makino (swimmer)
