= Sekiyado Domain =

Feudal domain in Edo period Japan

Sekiyado Domain 関宿藩
- under Tokugawa shogunate Japan
- 1590–1871
- Capital: Sekiyado Castle
  - Type: Daimyō
- Historical era: Edo period
  - Established: 1590
  - Disestablished: 1871
- Today part of: part of Ibaraki Prefecture

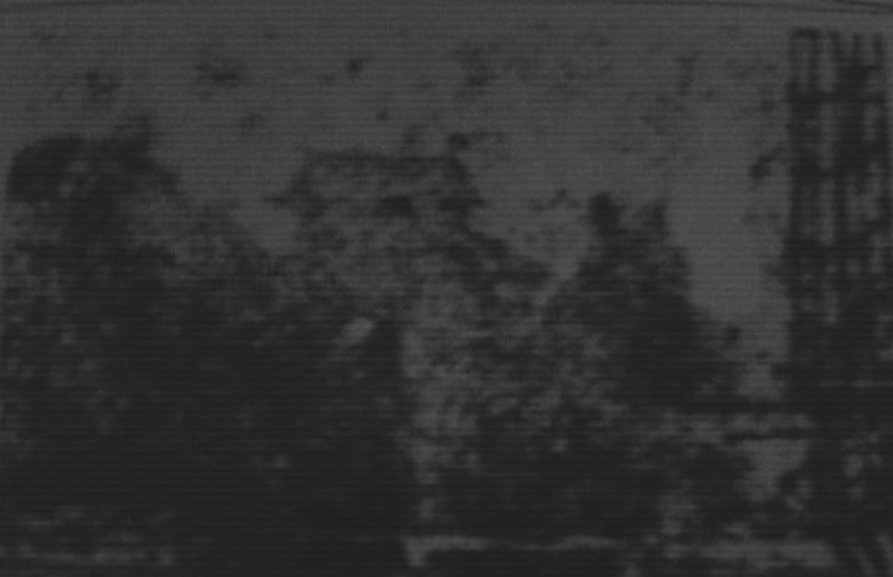
Sekiyado Castle, administrative center of Sekiyado Domain, circa 1860s

Sekiyado Domain (関宿藩, Sekiyado-han) was a feudal domain under the Tokugawa shogunate of Edo period Japan, located in Shimōsa Province (the northern portion of Chiba Prefecture and southern portion of Ibaraki Prefecture in modern-day, Japan). It was centered on Sekiyado Castle in what is now the city of Noda, Chiba.

Prime Minister Baron Suzuki Kantarō was born as the son of a samurai of Sekiyado Domain.

== History ==
Sekiyado is located at the confluence of the Tone River and the Edo River, and was thus a strategic location controlling river traffic in the northern Kantō region, as well as the northeastern approaches to Edo. Following the Battle of Odawara in 1590, the Kantō region by was assigned by Toyotomi Hideyoshi to Tokugawa Ieyasu, who appointed his half-brother Matsudaira (Hisamatsu) Yasumoto as daimyō of the newly formed Sekiyado Domain, with revenues of 20,000 koku. His revenues were increased to 40,000 koku in 1591. The domain passed from Matsudaira control to various other clans over its history: however, as an indication of the importance the Tokugawa shogunate placed on Sekiyado, of the 22 daimyōs who ruled the domain, 22 held the post of Rōjū and three held the post of Kyoto Shoshidai.

From 1669 (with an interruption from 1683 to 1705), the domain remained in the hands of the Kuze clan. Kuze Hirochika played an important role in the Bakumatsu period. As Rōjū, he opposed the Ansei Purge conducted by Ii Naosuke. He was a key supporter of the Kōbu gattai policy of supporting the Shogunate through marriage ties to the Imperial family, and one of the prime signatories to treaties ending Japan’s national isolation policy.

During the Boshin War, the domain officially remained a supporter of the shogunate, and contributed many samurai to the Shōgitai; however, many of its younger retainers supported the Sonnō jōi movement and defected to the Satchō Alliance. After the Battle of Ueno, the final daimyō of Sekiyado, Kuze Hironari, submitted to the new Meiji government. He was appointed domain governor under the new administration, until the abolition of the han system in July 1871 and subsequently became a viscount under the kazoku peerage. The former Sekiyado Domain was absorbed into the new Chiba Prefecture.

== Holdings at the end of the Edo period ==
As with most domains in the han system, Sekiyado Domain consisted of several discontinuous territories calculated to provide the assigned kokudaka, based on periodic cadastral surveys and projected agricultural yields.

- Shimōsa Province
  - 48 villages in Sashima District
  - 22 villages in Katsushika District
  - 48 villages in Soma District
- Mutsu Province (Iwashiro Province)
  - 6 villages in Shinobu District
- Hitachi Province
  - 14 villages in Shida District
  - 2 villages in Tsukuba District
- Shimotsuke Province
  - 19 villages in Tsuga District
  - 7 villages in Kawachi District
- Izumi Province
  - 9 villages in Izumi District

== List of daimyōs ==
#	Name	Tenure	Courtesy title	Court Rank	kokudaka
Matsudaira clan (Hisamatsu) (fudai) 1590–1616
1	Matsudaira Yasumoto (松平康元)	1590–1603	Inaba-no-kami (因幡守)	Lower 5th (従五位下)	22,700 koku
2	Matsudaira Tadayoshi (松平忠良)	1603–1616	Kai-no-kami (甲斐守)	Lower 5th (従五位下)	22,700 koku
Nomi-Matsudaira clan (fudai) 1617–1619
1	Matsudaira Shigekatsu (松平重勝)	1617–1619	Osumi-no-kami (大隈守)	Lower 5th (従五位下)	26,000 koku
Ogasawara clan (fudai) 1619–1640
1	Ogasawara Masanobu (小笠原政信)	1619–1640	Saemon-no-suke (左衛門佐)	Lower 4th (従四位下)	22,700 koku
2	Ogasawara Sadanobu (小笠原貞信)	1640–1640	Tosa-no-kami (土佐守)	Lower 5th (従五四位下)	22,700 koku
Hōjō clan (tozama) 1640–1644
1	Hōjō Ujishige (北条氏重)	1640–1644	Dewa-no-kami (出羽守)	Lower 4th Lower 5th (従五位下)	20,000 koku
Makino clan (fudai) 1644–1656
1	Makino Nobushige (牧野信成)	1644–1647	Hizen-no-kami (豊前守)	Lower 4th Lower 4th (従四位下)	17,000 koku
2	Makino Narishige (牧野親成)	1647–1656	Sado-no-kami (佐渡守); Jiju (侍従)	Lower 4th (従四位下)	17,000→27,000 koku
Itakura clan (fudai) 1656–1669
1	Itakura Shigemune (板倉重宗)	1656–1656	Suo-no-kami (周防守); Jiju (侍従)	Lower 4th (従四位下)	50,000 koku
2	Itakura Shigesatoi (板倉重郷)	1656–1661	Awa-no-kami (阿波守)	Lower 5th (従五位下)	50,000→45,000 koku
3	Itakura Shigetsune (板倉重常)	1661–1669	Yamato-no-kami (大和守); Jiju (侍従)	Lower 4th (従四位下)	-
Kuze clan (fudai) 1669–1683
1	Kuze Hiroyuki (久世 広之)	1669–1679	Yamato-no-kami (大和守); JIju (侍従)	Lower 4th (侍従)	50,000 koku
2	Kuze Shigeyuki (久世重之)	1679–1683	Yamato-no-kami (大和守); Jiju (侍従)	Lower 4th (侍従)	50,000 koku
Makino clan (fudai) 1683–1705
1	Makino Narisada (牧野成貞)	1683–1695	Bizen-no-kami (備後守); Jiju (侍従)	Lower 4th (侍従)	53,000→73,000 koku
2	Makino Nariharu (牧野成春)	1695–1705	Bizen-no-kami (備後守); Jiju (侍従)	Lower 4th (侍従)	73,000 koku
Kuze clan (fudai) 1705–1871
1	Kuze Shigeyuki (久世重之)	1705–1720	Yamato-no-kami (大和守); Jiju (侍従)	Lower 4th (従四位下)	50,000 koku
2	Kuze Teruyuki (久世暉之)	1720–1748	Sanuki-no-kami (讃岐守)	Lower 5th (従五位下)	50,000→60,000 koku
3	Kuze Hiroakira (久世広明)	1748–1785	Yamato-no-kami (大和守)	Lower 5th (従五位下)	60,000→58,000 koku
4	Kuze Hiroyasu (久世広明)	1785–1817	Yamato-no-kami (大和守)	Lower 5th (従五位下)	58,000→68,000 koku
5	Kuze Hirotaka (久世広運)	1817–1830	Nagato-no-kami (長門守)	Lower 5th (従五位下)	68,000 koku
6	Kuze Hirochika (久世広周)	1830–1862	Yamato-no-kami (大和守); Jiju (侍従)	Lower 4th (従四位下)	68,000 koku
7	Kuze Hirofumi (久世広文)	1862–1868	Oki-no-kami (隠岐守)	Lower 5th (従五位下)	68,000→48,000 koku
8	Kuze Hironari (久世広業)	1868–1871	x	Lower 5th (従五位下)	48,000 koku
