= Makino clan =

Makino clan 牧野
- Family crest (kamon) of main Makino line
- Home province: Mikawa Province
- Parent house: Takenouchi no Sukune
- Ruled until: 1871

The Makino clan (Japanese: 牧野氏, Hepburn: Makino-shi) are a daimyō branch of the samurai Minamoto clan in Edo period Japan.

In the Edo period, the Makino were identified as one of the fudai or insider daimyō clans which were hereditary vassals of the Tokugawa clan, in contrast with the tozama or outsider clans.

== Makino clan branches ==
The fudai Makino clan originated in 16th-century Mikawa Province. Their elevation in status by Toyotomi Hideyoshi dates from 1588. They claim descent from Takenouchi no Sukune, who was a legendary statesman and lover of the legendary Empress Jingū.

- a. The senior branch was established at Tako Domain in Kōzuke Province in 1590; and in 1616, their holdings were moved to Nagamine Domain in Echigo Province. From 1618 through 1868, this branch of the Makino remained at Nagaoka Domain (74,000 koku) in Echigo Province. The head of this clan line was ennobled as a viscount in the Meiji period.
- b. A cadet branch of the Makino was created in 1633. The Makino were installed at Sekiyado Domain in Shimōsa Province in 1644. From 1668 through the Meiji Restoration, the descendants had holdings at Tanabe Domain (35,000 koku) in Tango Province. Descendants lived from 1634 through 1868 at Mineyama Domain (11,000 koku) in Echigo Province. The head of this clan line was ennobled as a viscount in the Meiji period.
- c. Another cadet branch of the Makino was created in 1634. They were established at Yoita Domain in Echigo Province in 1634; and then, from 1702 through 1868, this branch was transferred to Komoro (15,000 koku) in Shinano Province. The head of this clan line was ennobled as a viscount in the Meiji period.
- d. Yet a further cadet branch of the Makino was created in 1680. These Makino resided successively at Sekiyado Domain in Shimōsa Province in 1683; at Yoshida Domain at Mikawa Province in 1705; at Nabeoka Domain in Hyūga Province in 1712; and, from 1747 through 1868 at Kasama Domain (80,000 koku) in Hitachi Province. The head of this clan line was ennobled as a viscount in the Meiji period.

== Notable members of the clan ==
- Makino Yasunari, 1555–1609.
- Makino Chikashige, 1654-1668—3rd Kyoto shoshidai.
- Makino Hideshige, 1724–1734 17th Kyoto shoshidai.
- Makino Sadamichi, 1742–1749 19th Kyoto shoshidai.
- Makino Sadanaga, 1781–1784 28th Kyoto shoshidai.
- Makino Tadakiyo, 1798–1801 32nd Kyoto shoshidai.
- Makino Tadamasa, 1840–1843 48th Kyoto shoshidai.
- Makino Tadayuki, 1862–1863 55th Kyoto shoshidai.
- Makino Nobuaki — created baron (1907); created viscount (1918).
- Makino Kazushige – House of Peers.
- Makino Tadaatsu, 1870–1935 — House of Peers.
