= The Lost Tapes =

The Lost Tapes or Lost Tapes may refer to:

== Music recordings ==
- The Lost Tapes (Nas album), a 2002 compilation album
- Lost (T)apes, a compilation album by Guano Apes released in 2006
- The Lost Tapes – Rare Recordings 1991–2007, a 2007 compilation album by Ooberman
- The Lost Tapes, a 2007 release by New Orleans' rapper Mac (McKinley Phipps)
- The Lost Tapes (Can album), 2012
- The Lost Tape (mixtape), a 2012 mixtape by 50 Cent
- The Lost Tapes (Big Brother and the Holding Company album)
- The Lost Tapes – Remixed, a 2015 album by Sam Smith
- The Lost Tapes, by Ghostface Killah
- The Lost Tapes (Sugababes album), 2022

== Video recordings ==
- The Lost Tapes (Dead Kennedys), 2003
- The Lost Tapes aka The Lost West Side Story Tapes, a 2002 video release of the "West Side Story" set recorded for the 1985 Buddy Rich album Mr Drums:...

== Other uses ==
- Lost Tapes, an American television series that aired on Animal Planet
- The Lost Tape (film), a 2012 Indian Hindi-language horror film
- The Lost Tapes (TV series), an American documentary series that aired on the Smithsonian Channel
- Chernobyl: The Lost Tapes, a 2022 British documentary film
- Regular Show: The Lost Tapes, a revival of American animated series Regular Show

== See also ==
- The Lost Tapes of Cogumelo, a 1990 compilation album of various artists released by the Brazilian label Cogumelo Records
- Lost Tapes of Opio, a 1996 release by Jon Anderson
- Beginnings: The Lost Tapes 1988–1991, a 2007 (posthumously released) compilation album of material recorded by Tupac Shakur
