= Global Warming Hoax of 1874 =

Fictitious article written to the Kansas City Star in 1874

The "Global Warming Hoax of 1874" refers to a piece of fictitious writing, submitted to the editor of the Kansas City Times by an individual named L.B. Legendre. The column, titled A Scientific Sensation, claims Giovanni Donati, a 19th-century astronomer, discovered that the transatlantic telegraph cable was causing the Earth to be pulled towards the Sun, and issues a warning that in twelve years there would be a dramatic increase in temperature, causing the extinction of all life on Earth.

== Article ==
The column states that Legendre's friend, who was in Italy at the time, wrote to Legendre to inform him of the discovery made by Donati. His friend says, "Donati ...had been a victim, not to disease or to time, ... but to nervous excitement or fright, caused by a discovery which he had made of great and even agonizing importance to the human race". Legendre says Donati had been calculating and recording the location of the Earth in orbit as well as the Earth's distance from the Sun using instruments Donati had constructed himself, but that "he was not universally credited by his scientific colleagues". Through his meticulous measurements Donati noticed a change in the distance from the Sun when the transatlantic telegraph cable was laid in 1858, and that, "every month after that...its distance was perceptibly lessened". Legendre's friend said that the cable brought the Earth closer to the Sun due to a relationship between gravitation and magnetism. Donati said, "That in twelve years the climate of Europe would become tropical, if not unfit for human existence, and that in a few more years this globe... would be precipitated into the sun." After his failed attempt to receive help from the government, Donati took it upon himself to solve the issue. He brought together "several wealthy Italians...(and)...chartered a brig and expensive machinery", in order to cut the transatlantic cable. Donati found that the distance had returned to normal, but shortly after the cable was repaired, causing the Earth to again move towards the Sun. Legendre says this caused Donati to fall ill, and eventually die.

== Reality ==
While not completely made up, a vast majority of the article is a work of fiction. Giovanni Donati was a real astronomer who did die in 1873, however he did not die from the stress of the Earth hurtling towards the Sun but due to health complications from contracting cholera. The article also claims that Donati and the scientists caused the first break in the transatlantic cable, when the first break actually occurred in 1858 shortly after the cable was laid.

== Reception ==
The article was published in a few other newspapers shortly afterwards but failed to gain much traction. Hoaxes like this were becoming more common place in the 19th century, with a rise in media and journalistic hoaxes. Some newspapers even made jokes about the astronomer's death and the cause of it. The Northern Ohio Journal ran a column on L.B. Legendre's article titled, "A Cheerful Bit of News", that read "This will be discouraging news to the insurance companies" and "Such a disaster is about the only thing that could beat the Chicago fire".

== Similar incidents ==
The Global Warming Hoax of 1874 was a journalistic/media hoax, which is when a fictitious story is purposefully written to appear as real and factual. In the 19th century these appeared often in newspapers and magazines, but can now be found in any type of media. Some examples of other journalistic/media hoaxes around the same time are:

- Great Wall of China hoax
- The Balloon-Hoax
- The Bathtub Hoax
- The Man Eating Tree of Madagascar
- The Great Moon Hoax
- The Central Park Zoo Escape
