= Isoroku Yamamoto's sleeping giant quote =

Famous quote regarding the Japanese attack on Pearl Harbor

"I fear all we have done is to awaken a sleeping giant and fill him with a terrible resolve"
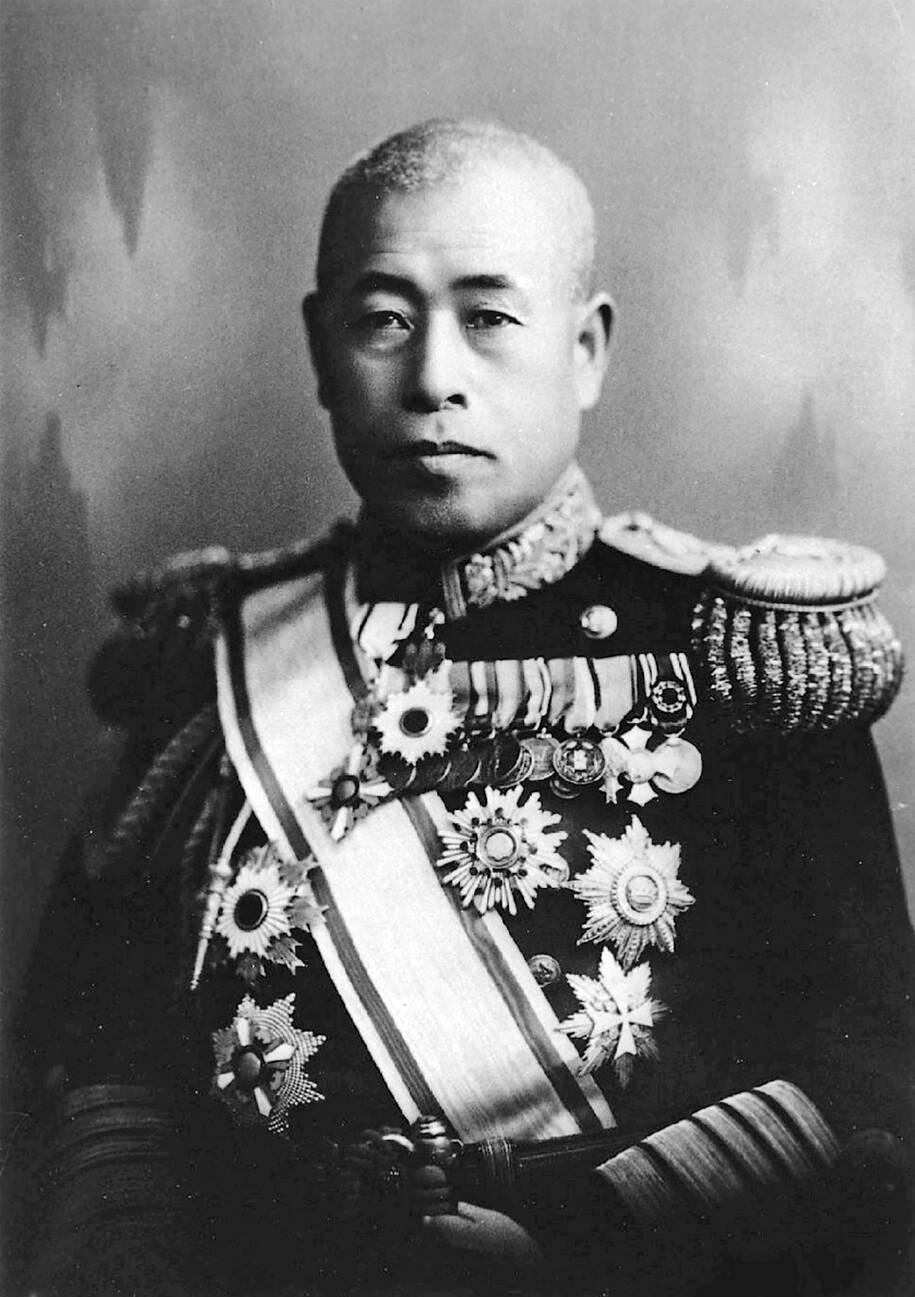
- Yamamoto in 1940. Yamamoto is said to have written the quote in real life, but there is no evidence of this.
- Character: Admiral Isoroku Yamamoto
- Actor: Sō Yamamura
- Written by: Hideo Oguni; Ryūzō Kikushima; Akira Kurosawa
- First used in: Tora! Tora! Tora!
- Also used in: Abridged: Pearl Harbor; Midway

Isoroku Yamamoto's sleeping giant quote is a film quote attributed to Japanese Admiral Isoroku Yamamoto regarding the 1941 attack on Pearl Harbor by forces of Imperial Japan. The quotation is portrayed at the very end of the 1970 film Tora! Tora! Tora! as "I fear all we have done is to awaken a sleeping giant and fill him with a terrible resolve." There is no evidence that Yamamoto ever wrote or said the quote.

Vermont C. Royster offers a possible origin to the phrase attributed to Napoleon, "China is a sickly, sleeping giant. But when she awakes the world will tremble." An abridged version of the quotation is also featured in the 2001 film Pearl Harbor. The 2019 film Midway also features Yamamoto speaking aloud the sleeping giant quote.

== Overview ==
The director of Tora! Tora! Tora!, Richard Fleischer, stated that while Yamamoto may never have said those words, the film's producer, Elmo Williams, had found the line written in Yamamoto's diary. Williams, in turn, has stated that Larry Forrester, the screenwriter, found a 1943 letter from Yamamoto to the Admiralty in Tokyo containing the quotation. However, Forrester cannot produce the letter, nor can anyone else, American or Japanese, recall it or find it. Randall Wallace, the screenwriter of the 2001 film Pearl Harbor, readily admitted that he copied the line from Tora! Tora! Tora!

Yamamoto believed that Japan could not win a protracted war with the United States. Moreover, he seemed later to have believed that the Pearl Harbor attack had been a blunder strategically, morally, and politically, even though he was the person who originated the idea of a surprise attack on the military installation. It is recorded that while all his staff members were celebrating, "Yamamoto alone" spent the day after Pearl Harbor "sunk in apparent depression". Yamamoto was upset by the bungling of the Foreign Ministry, which led to the attack happening while the countries were still at peace, thus, along with other factors, making the incident an unprovoked surprise attack that enraged American public opinion.

== Similar sayings ==
On December 8, 1941, the day after the attack on Pearl Harbor, an inspirational statement was made by Don McNeill during the NBC radio broadcast of Don McNeill's Breakfast Club. His statement ended with "... and also don’t forget, sometimes you can strike a giant who is dozing momentarily, when the giant is awakened, look out." A portion of the broadcast was replayed on the Pearl Harbor attack-themed debut episode of the Smithsonian Channel documentary program The Lost Tapes.

In The Reluctant Admiral, Hiroyuki Agawa gives a quotation from a reply by Yamamoto to Ogata Taketora on January 9, 1942, which is similar to the famous version: "A military man can scarcely pride himself on having 'smitten a sleeping enemy'; it is more a matter of shame, simply, for the one smitten. I would rather you made your appraisal after seeing what the enemy does, since it is certain that, angered and outraged, he will soon launch a determined counterattack."

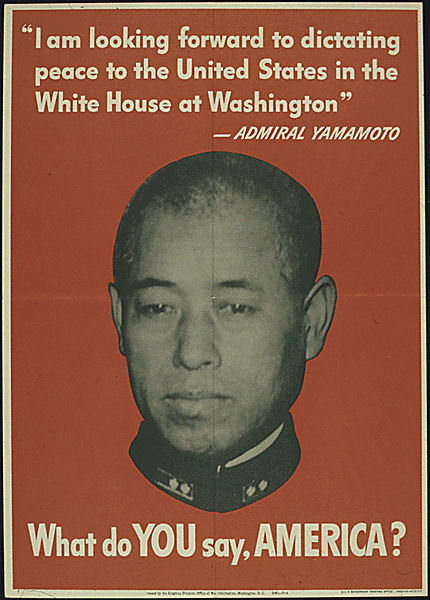
A World War II poster depicting Isoroku Yamamoto with his quote "I am looking forward to dictating peace to the United States in the White House in Washington."

The other common quotation attributed to Yamamoto predicting the future outcome of a naval war against the United States is, "I can run wild for six months... after that, I have no expectation of success". As it happened, the Battle of Midway, the critical naval battle considered to be the turning point of the War in the Pacific, concluded exactly six months after the Pearl Harbor attack. Similar to the above quotation was another quotation: Yamamoto, when once asked his opinion on the war, pessimistically said that the only way for Japan to win the war was to dictate terms in the White House.

Yamamoto's meaning was that military victory, in a protracted war against an opponent with as much of a population and industrial advantage as the United States possessed, was completely impossible, a rebuff to the Kantai Kessen Decisive Battle Doctrine of those who thought that winning a single major battle against the United States Navy would end the war, just as the Japanese victory in the Battle of Tsushima had ended the Russo-Japanese War in 1905. Yamamoto's quote about peace terms in the White House was abridged by Japanese propaganda to make it seem like an optimistic prediction; this version was promptly picked up by American propaganda to look even more boastful (see illustration).
