= Manoj Nandwana =

Bollywood film producer and distributor

- Born: Manoj Nandwana; Mumbai, Maharashtra, India
- Occupations: Film Producer and Film Distributor
- Known for: Film Gulaal, Udaan etc.
- Website: http://www.jaiviratra.com/

Manoj Nandwana is a film distributor and Film Producer of Bollywood. with more than 14 years of experience in the movie business. Manoj Nandwana also famous for his controversial film project based on Neera Wadia.

== Background ==
Born in Rajasthan, Manoj Nandwana is a commerce graduate and holds degree of Chartered Accountancy. He later on founded Jai Viratra Entertainment Limited on 14 November 1996 and has been distributing movies across India since then. Initially, JVEL started to distribute big budgeted films in the territory of Rajasthan. Karan Arjun, Bombay, Zamana Diwanaa and Kudrat are some of the movies distributed under the JVEL banner.

== Film Production ==
In the year 2002, Manoj Nandwana's JVEL ventured into film production in association with M/s Raj Films and produced Karampath starring Sunil Shetty in the lead. After which, 'Do Chehare’ followed featuring Suniel Shetty, Krishna Abhishek, Shatrughan Sinha, Farha, Shakti Kapoor, Kiran Kumar, Mohnish Behl, Negar Khan, and Sohail Khan. In the year 2007, their music album ‘Poo Kya Jalwa Hai’ was released. JVEL also owns the worldwide distribution rights for ‘Banegi Apni Baat’ starring Raghuveer Yadav.

Paresh Rawal and Om Puri starrer Road to Sangam was jointly produced by JVEL and Gemini Studios which had released in 2009. Critically acclaimed 2010 release Udaan was co-produced. by JVEL in association with UTV Motion Pictures and Sanjay Singh.

== Filmography ==
Year	Title	Distributor / Producer
2012	Diary of a Butterfly	Distributor
2012	The Lost Tape (film)	Distributor
2014	Tum Ho Yaara	Distributor
2014	Strings of Passion	Distributor
2014	Riyasat (film)	Distributor
2014	A Decent Arrangement.	Distributor
2020	The Hundred Bucks	Distributor
2022	Murder at Koh e Fiza	Producer and Distributor
2023	Unwoman (2023 film)	Distributor
2024	Gin Ke Dus	Distributor
2025	Diary of a Woman	Distributor
