= Legacy of Napoleon =

Legacy of French general and statesman

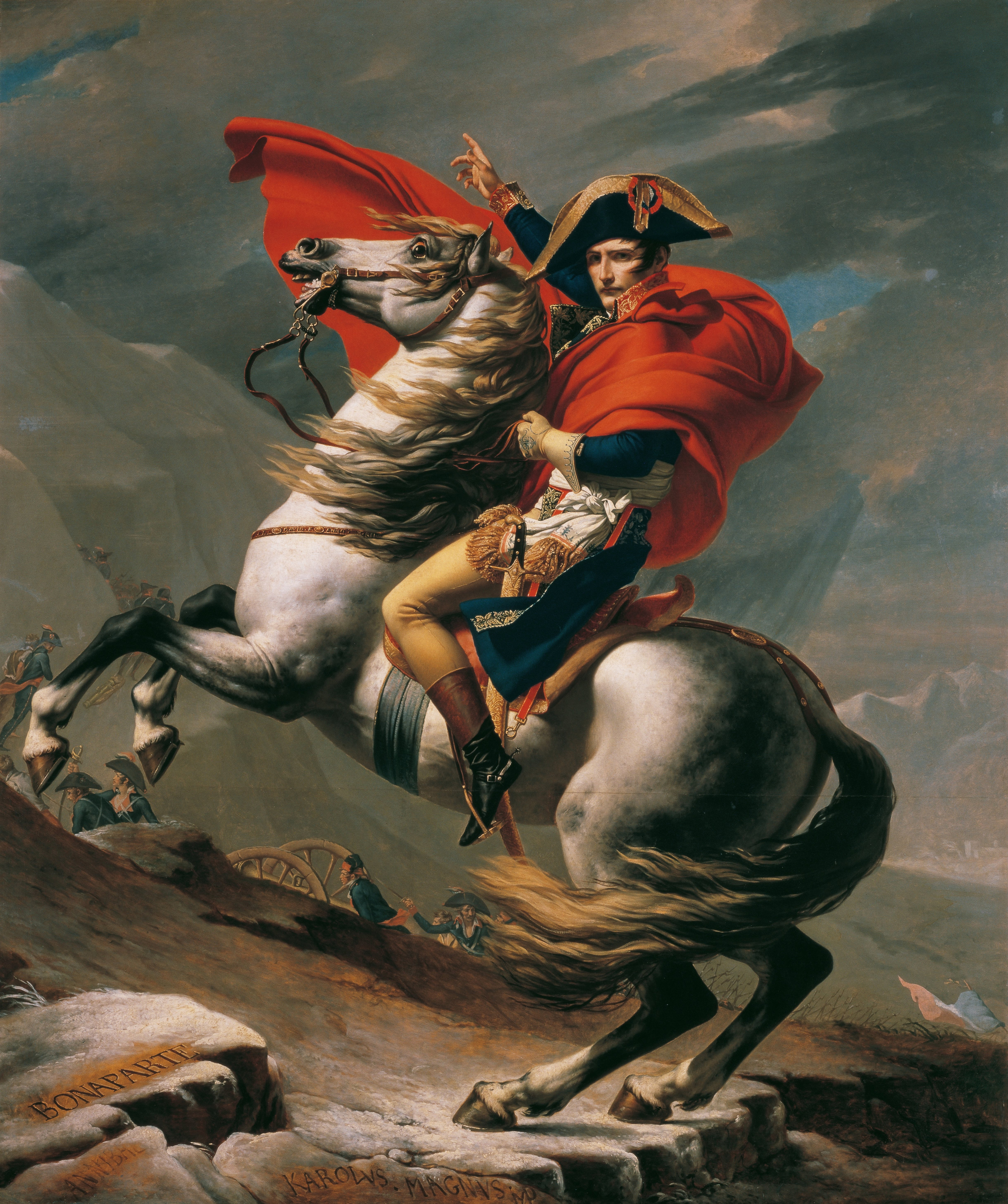
Napoleon Crossing the Alps, romantic version by Jacques-Louis David in 1805

The legacy of French emperor Napoleon Bonaparte (1769–1821) is highly polarized. The large and steadily expanding body of historiography in French, English, Russian, Spanish, and other languages has been extensively summarized and evaluated by numerous scholars.

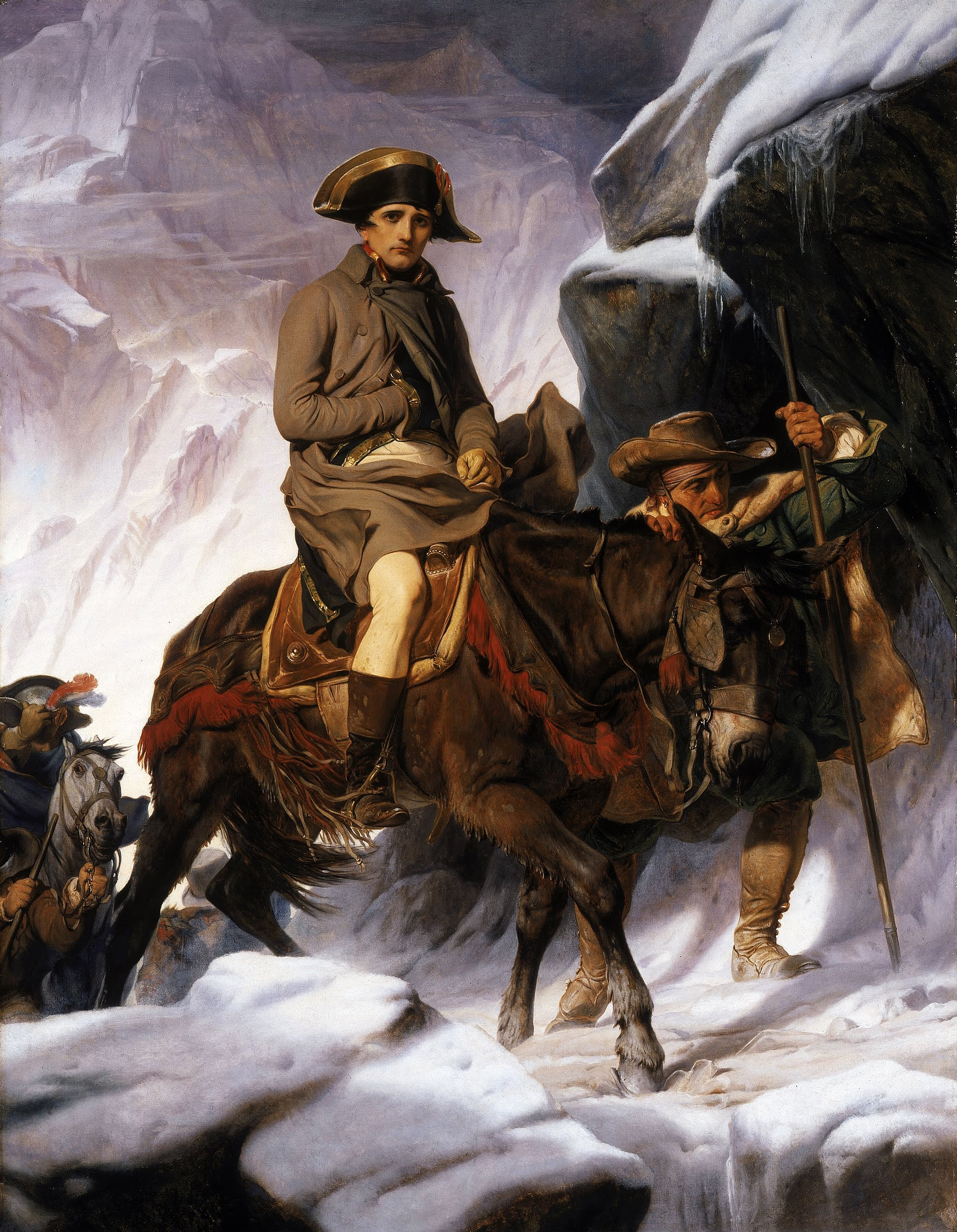
Bonaparte Crossing the Alps, realist version by Paul Delaroche in 1848

== Legacy and evaluation ==
=== Criticism ===
The Third of May 1808 by Francisco Goya, attacks Napoleon by showing Spanish resisters being executed by his soldiers.

In the political realm, historians debate whether Napoleon was "an enlightened despot who laid the foundations of modern Europe" or "a megalomaniac who wrought greater misery than any man before the coming of Hitler". Napoleon had grandiose foreign policy ambitions across Europe and the Americas, but he was also repeatedly attacked by hostile coalitions of enemies, many of whom feared him as a product of the French Revolution. After a series of defeats, the continental powers as late as 1808 were willing to give him nearly all of his gains and titles, but as the United Kingdom remained beyond his reach, Napoleon became overly aggressive and pushed for too much, until his empire collapsed.

Despite ending his military career in defeat by the terms of the Treaty of Paris of 1815, Napoleon has been labeled a conquering military genius and his campaigns have been studied in military schools worldwide. Although Napoleon ended lawlessness and disorder in post-Revolutionary France, he did so as an usurper who brought France under a military dictatorship, usurping the powerful French military that had instituted a levee en masse. His critics charge that he was not troubled when faced with the prospect of war and death for thousands, turned his search for undisputed rule into a series of conflicts throughout Europe and ignored treaties and conventions alike. His role in the Haitian Revolution and decision to reinstate slavery in France's overseas colonies are controversial and affect his reputation.

French liberal intellectual Benjamin Constant (1767–1830) was a staunch critique of the political homogenization and personality cult that dominated Napoleonic France. He expressed his condemnation of Bonapartism through various books, including as The Spirit of Conquest and Usurpation (1814) and Principles of Politics Applicable to All Representative Governments (1815). Constant asserted that Napoleonic regime was even more tyrannical than the Bourbon monarchy, since it forced the masses to support its ideological narratives through imperialism and jingoism.

Napoleon institutionalized plunder of occupied territories: he loaded French museums with art stolen from across Europe. Artefacts were brought to the Musée du Louvre for a grand central museum; an example which would later be followed by others. Claude Ribbe in 2005 argued that his racism toward blacks inspired Hitler in his treatment of Jews. David G. Chandler, a historian of Napoleonic warfare, wrote in 1973 that, "Nothing could be more degrading to the former [Napoleon] and more flattering to the latter [Hitler]. The comparison is odious. On the whole Napoleon was inspired by a noble dream, wholly dissimilar from Hitler's ... Napoleon left great and lasting testimonies to his genius—in codes of law and national identities which survive to the present day. Adolf Hitler left nothing but destruction."

Critics argue Napoleon's true legacy must reflect the loss of status for France and needless deaths brought by his rule: historian Victor Davis Hanson writes, "After all, the military record is unquestioned—17 years of wars, perhaps six million Europeans dead, France bankrupt, her overseas colonies lost." McLynn states that, "He can be viewed as the man who set back European economic life for a generation by the dislocating impact of his wars." Vincent Cronin replies that such criticism relies on the flawed premise that Napoleon was responsible for the wars which bear his name, when in fact France was the victim of a series of coalitions that aimed to destroy the ideals of the Revolution.

British military historian Correlli Barnett calls him "a social misfit" who exploited France for his personal megalomaniac goals. He says Napoleon's reputation is exaggerated. French scholar Jean Tulard provided an influential account of his image as a saviour. Louis Bergeron has praised the numerous changes he made to French society, especially regarding the law as well as education. His greatest failure was the Russian invasion. Many historians have blamed Napoleon's poor planning, but Russian scholars instead emphasize the Russian response, noting the notorious winter weather was just as hard on the defenders.

American historian Paul Schroeder (1927–2020) is willing to grant that Napoleon was a genius regarding "military, administrative, organizational, political, even literary [efforts] ... [with] an extraordinary capacity for planning, decision making, memory, work, mastery of detail, and leadership." The problem is that he used this genius for criminal ends:

...he repeatedly and deliberately violated the neutrality of small states; that he resorted to judicial arrests and murders against foreign subjects; that he ordered his generals and satraps to use preventive terror to control their domains; that he not only occupied and suppressed other states in war, but also used tactics of bullying, manipulation, and extortion on them in times of peace, almost without regard to whether they were hostile or friendly; that he frequently violated understandings, promises, and treaty commitments; that on principle he ruthlessly subordinated the interests of all the states and peoples he ruled to those of France and ultimately of himself personally....[and so on].

=== Propaganda and memory ===
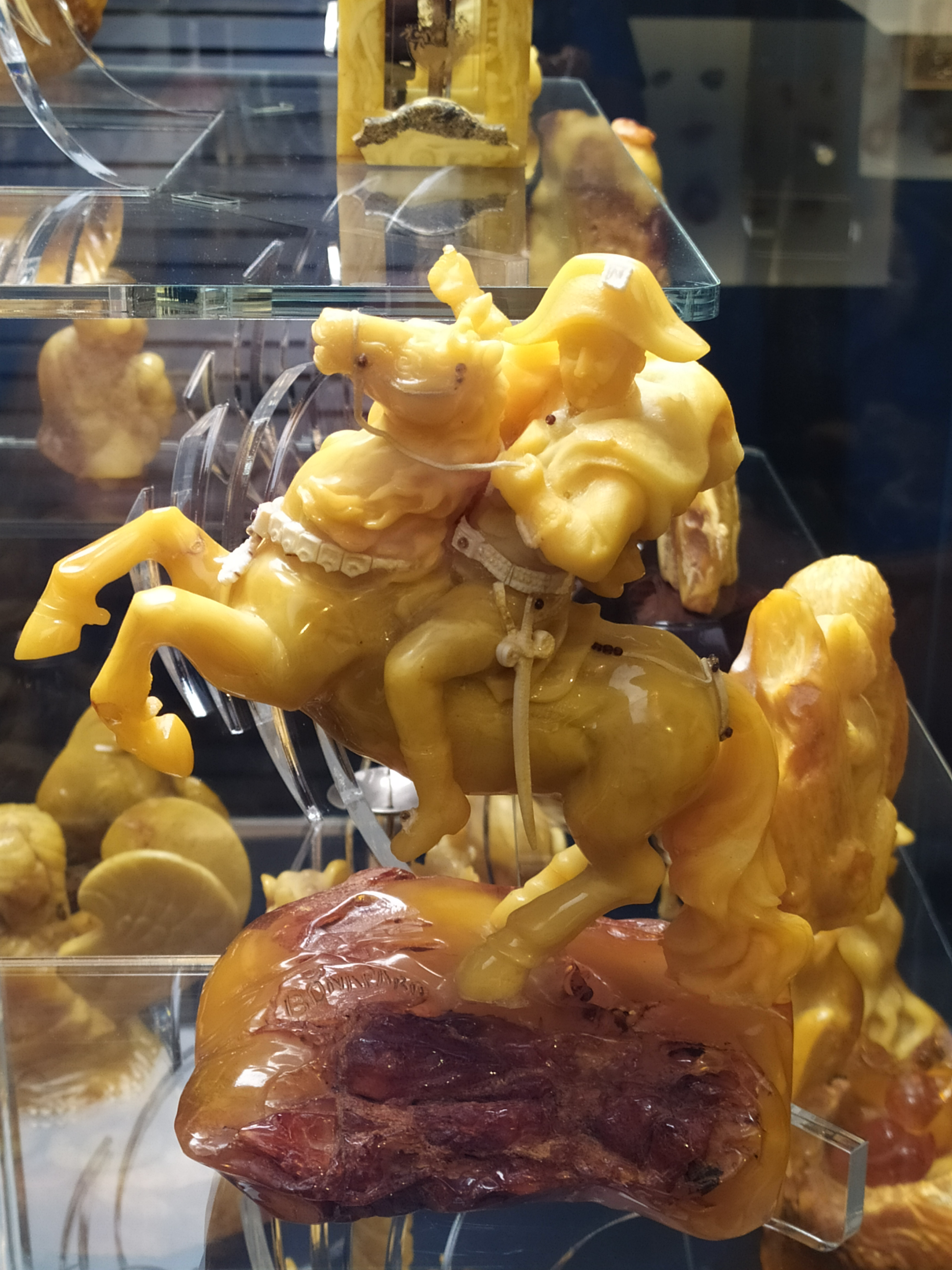
Reproduction in amber of David's Napoleon Crossing the Alps

Napoleon's use of propaganda contributed to his rise to power, legitimated his régime, and established his image for posterity. Strict censorship, controlling aspects of the press, books, theatre, and art were part of his propaganda scheme, aimed at portraying him as bringing desperately wanted peace and stability to France. The propagandistic rhetoric changed in relation to events and to the atmosphere of Napoleon's reign, focusing first on his role as a general in the army and identification as a soldier, and moving to his role as emperor and a civil leader. Specifically targeting his civilian audience, Napoleon fostered a relationship with the contemporary art community, taking an active role in commissioning and controlling different forms of art production to suit his propaganda goals.

In Britain, Russia and across Europe—though not in France—Napoleon was a popular topic of caricature. After Nazi Germany conquered France in 1940, Hitler marched in triumph in Paris and paid homage to Napoleon at Les Invalides.

==== French remembrance and evaluation ====
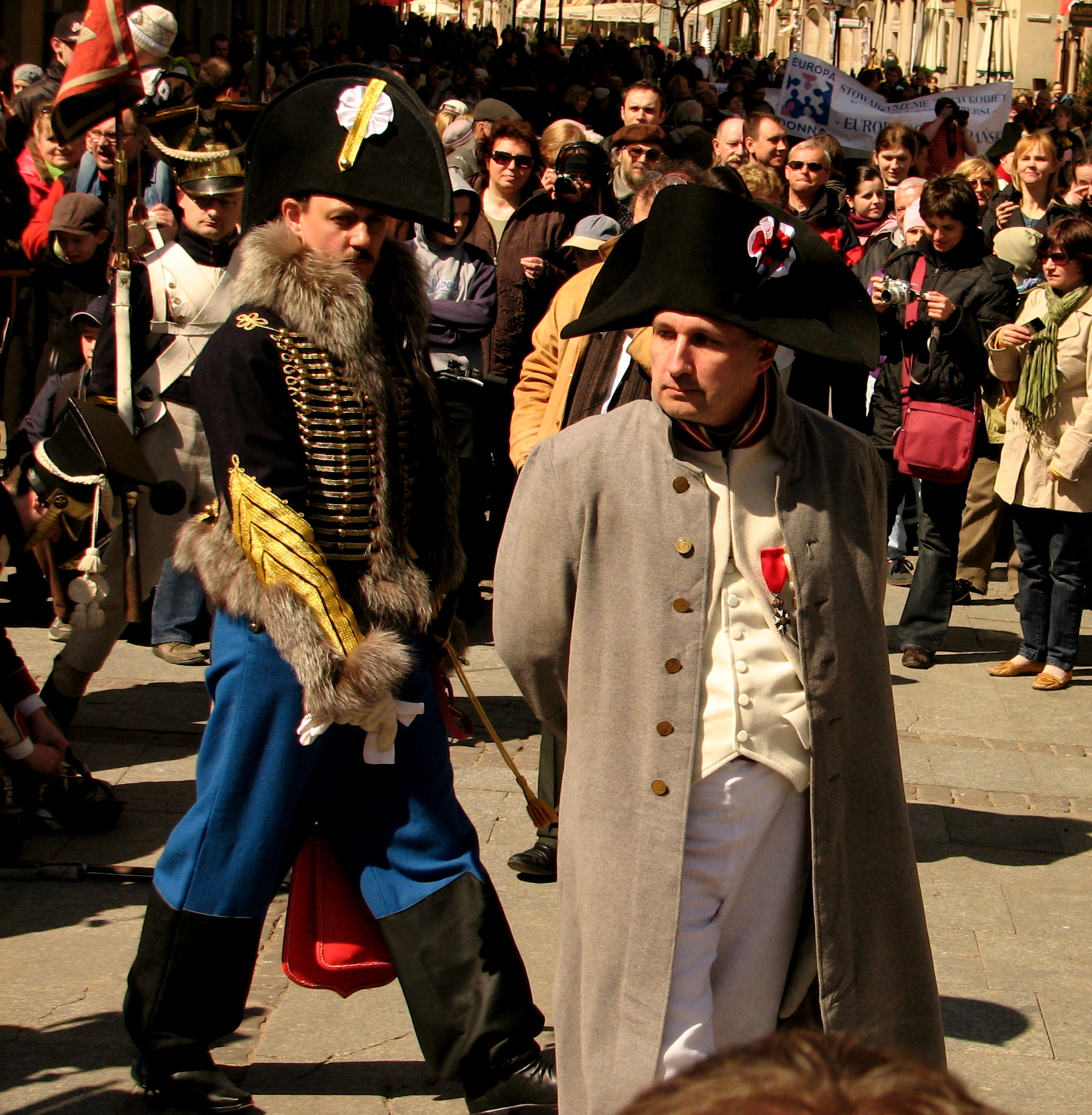
Reenactment of the entry of Napoleon to Gdańsk after siege

Hazareesingh (2004) explores how Napoleon's image and memory are best understood. They played a key role in collective political defiance of the Bourbon restoration monarchy in 1815–1830. People from different walks of life and areas of France, particularly Napoleonic veterans, drew on the Napoleonic legacy and its connections with the ideals of the 1789 Revolution.

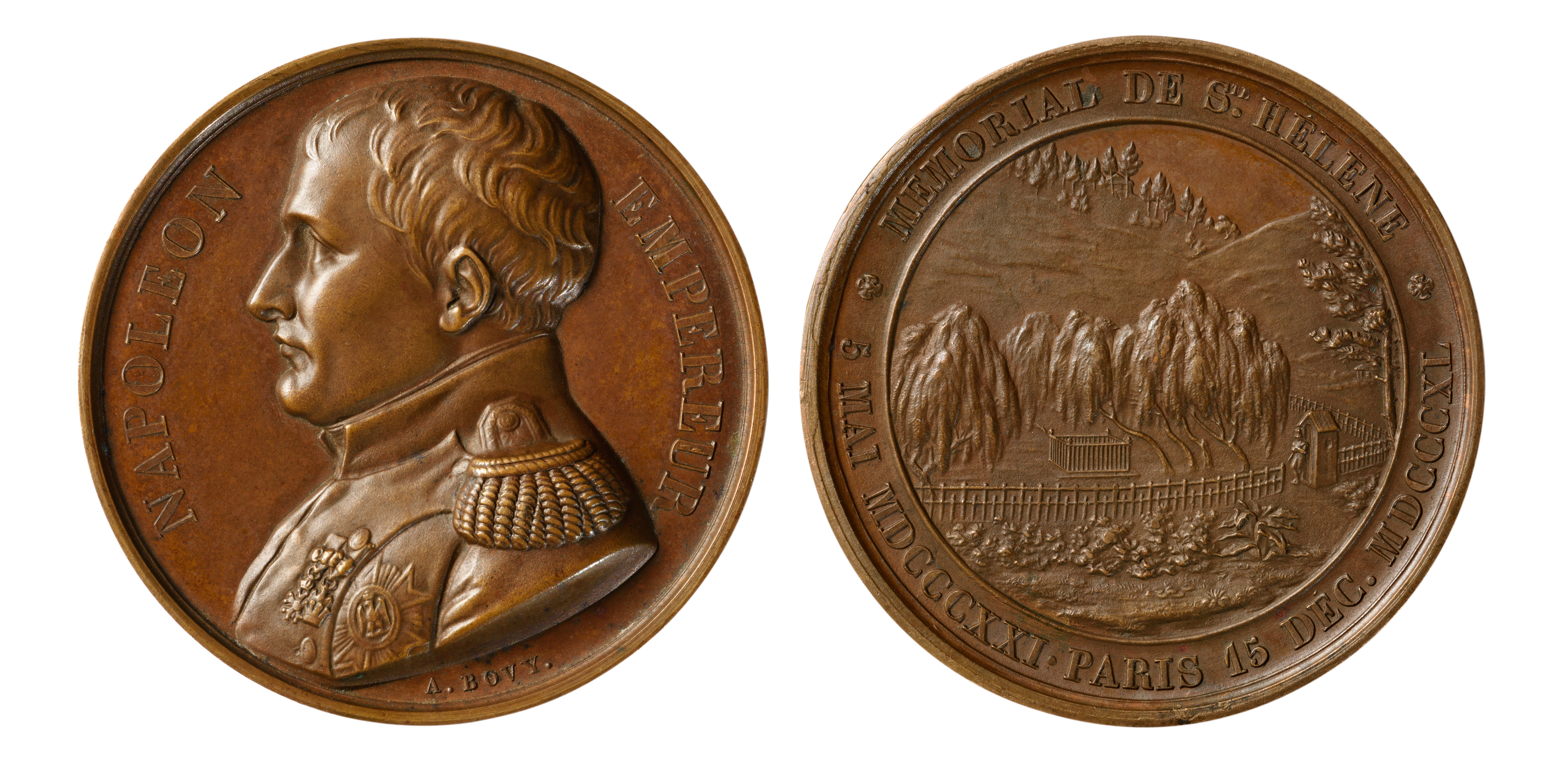
Medallion showing Napoléon in exile on St Helena, Paris 1840

Widespread rumours of Napoleon's return from St. Helena and Napoleon as an inspiration for patriotism, individual and collective liberties, and political mobilization manifested themselves in seditious materials, displaying the tricolor and rosettes. There were also subversive activities celebrating anniversaries of Napoleon's life and reign and disrupting royal celebrations—they demonstrated the prevailing and successful goal of the varied supporters of Napoleon to constantly destabilize the Bourbon regime.

Datta (2005) shows that, following the collapse of militaristic Boulangism in the late 1880s, the Napoleonic legend was divorced from party politics and revived in popular culture. Concentrating on two plays and two novels from the period—Victorien Sardou's Madame Sans-Gêne (1893), Maurice Barrès's Les Déracinés (1897), Edmond Rostand's L'Aiglon (1900), and André de Lorde and Gyp's Napoléonette (1913)—Datta examines how writers and critics of the Belle Époque exploited the Napoleonic legend for diverse political and cultural ends.

International Napoleonic Congresses take place regularly, with participation by members of the French and American military, French politicians and scholars from different countries. Napoleon died on May 5, 1821. The anniversary 200 years later on May 5, 2021, saw France deeply divided over his memory and heritage.

President Charles de Gaulle disapproved of Napoleon. While noting Napoleon's genius, de Gaulle wrote that "he left France smaller than he had found her". Other French presidents have usually avoided mention of Napoleon; for a conservative to praise him would often mean counterattacks from the left, and vice versa for left-wing politicians who are typically critical of the emperor. President Emmanuel Macron has praised him, saying that "Napoleon is the man who gave shape to our political and administrative organization, to the uncertain sovereignty that emerged from the Revolution. ... After months of failure, with France besieged, Napoleon was able to incarnate order." The remarks were criticized, especially on the issues of Haiti, slavery and race. Macron subsequently clarified his comments, stating that the restoration of slavery in 1802 was a "mistake, a betrayal of the spirit of the Enlightenment".

=== Long-term influence outside France ===
Napoleon was responsible for spreading the values of the French Revolution to other countries, especially in legal reform. Napoleon did not touch serfdom in Russia. After the fall of Napoleon, not only was the Napoleonic Code retained by conquered countries including the Netherlands, Belgium, parts of Italy and Germany, but has been used as the basis of certain parts of law outside Europe including the Dominican Republic, the US state of Louisiana and the Canadian province of Quebec. The code was also used as a model in many parts of Latin America.

The memory of Napoleon in Poland is favorable, for his support for independence and opposition to Russia, his legal code, the abolition of serfdom, and the introduction of modern middle class bureaucracies. Napoleon indirectly began the process of Latin American independence when he invaded Spain in 1808. The abdication of King Charles IV and his son, Ferdinand VII created a power vacuum that was filled by native born political leaders such as Simón Bolívar and José de San Martín. Such leaders embraced nationalistic sentiments that were influenced by French nationalism and fought for independence which ultimately succeeded. Everett Rummage says Napoleon is "nearly synonymous with the spread of the modern bureaucratic state, not only the institutions themselves, but the modern outlook that goes with them: meritocracy, liberal property rights, public service and equality before the law."

==== Germany ====
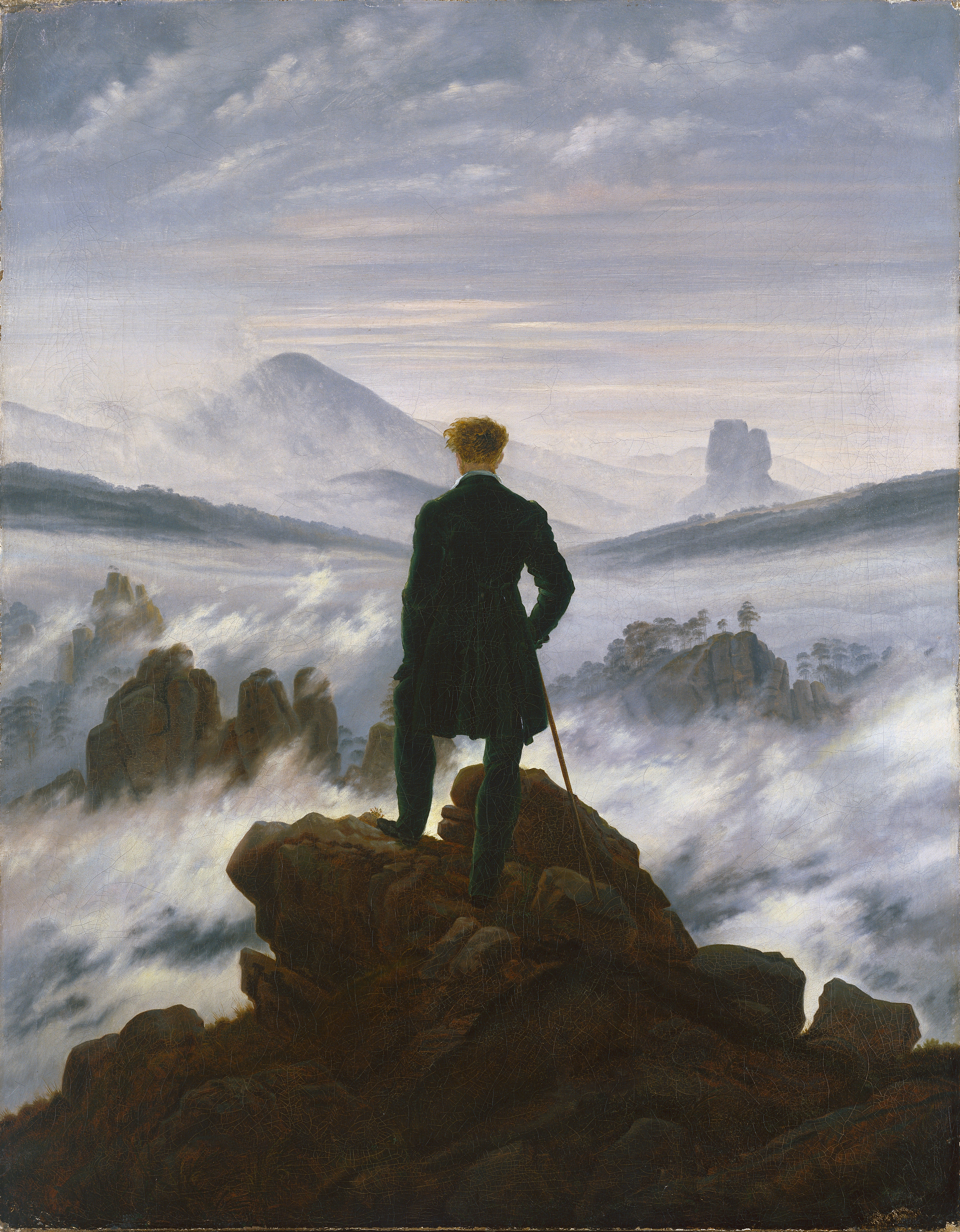
Caspar David Friedrich – Wanderer above the Sea of Fog

Napoleon's disruptions of the old order created the space in which modern Germany was created. According to Katherine Aaslestad and Karen Hagemann:

1806 was a transformative year for German central Europe. It brought humiliating military defeat and occupation for Prussia, the demise of the Holy Roman Empire, and a complete territorial and structural reorganization for the region. Historians have long viewed this reorganization as essential for the rise of German nationalism, state-building, and modernization.

For example, British historian T. C. W. Blanning argues that Napoleon's actions in Germany did speed up the emergence of a German national consciousness; on the other hand it did nothing to modernize Germany's governance, economy, or culture. A major product of the French occupation was a strong development in German nationalism which eventually turned the German Confederation into the German Empire after a series of conflicts and other political developments. German Romanticism was nationalistic and therefore became hostile to the ideals of the French Revolution. Major Romantic thinkers especially Ernst Moritz Arndt (1769–1860), Johann Gottlieb Fichte (1762–1814), Heinrich von Kleist (1777–1811), and Friedrich Schleiermacher (1768–1834) embraced reactionary politics and were hostile to political liberalism, rationalism, neoclassicism, and cosmopolitanism. German politician Carl Theodor Welcker (1790–1869) described Napoleon as "the greatest Maestro of Machiavellism".

In the 21st century, German historiography has shifted from nationalism to a pan-European viewpoint, opening the way for more favourable treatment of the Emperor. Most recent scholars reject the old notion of separate national paths typified by models of the German "Sonderweg" or the French "singularité française". Napoleon installed his relatives in power across the expanded empire. Jérôme Bonaparte, the youngest brother, became King of Westphalia and has the reputation of a playboy. However Owen Connelly examines the financial, military, and administrative performance to conclude that he was loyal, useful, and a soldierly asset to Napoleon.

==== Poland ====
Emperor Napoleon left a significant mark on Polish National Romanticism. The Polish–Lithuanian Commonwealth was partitioned between Austria, Prussia and Russia in 1795, while Napoleon was rising in France. From the beginning Napoleon showed great sympathy for the cause of Polish independence, and declared the restoration of and independent Poland as one of his goals.

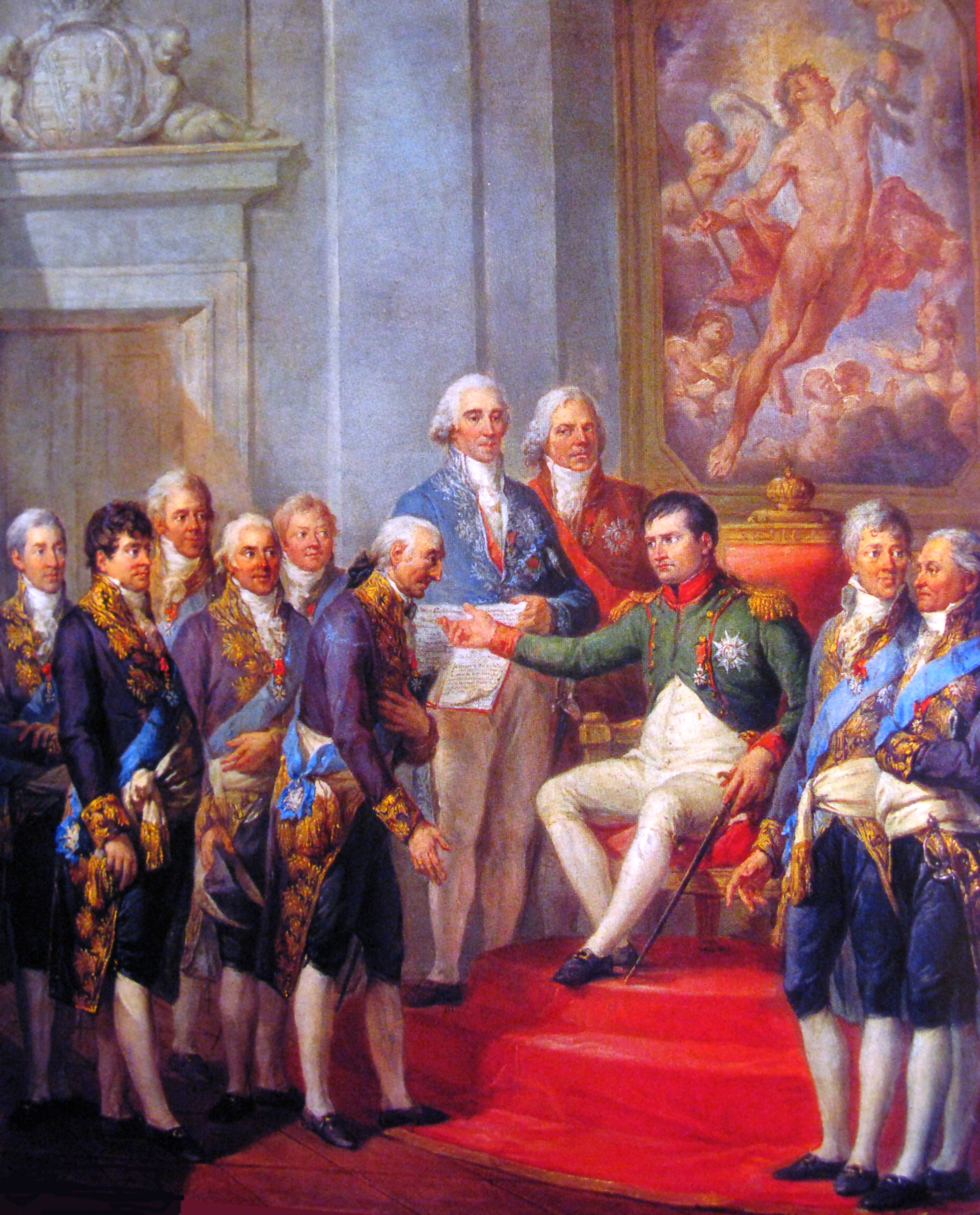
Emperor Napoleon granting the constitution of the Duchy of Warsaw.

After defeating the Kingdom of Prussia, Napoleon created the Duchy of Warsaw, a Polish State. Bonaparte regarded the Poles as his most loyal subjects and allies. Many Polish generals and leaders, such as Józef Poniatowski and Jan Henryk Dąbrowski, which are regarded as Polish National heroes, fought alongside Napoleon, with the goal of restoring the ancient Polish State. Many Polish Legionaires followed Napoleon into exile to Elba, and returned with him to France. Famously, Józef Poniatowski and many of his Polish Lancers died fighting for Napoleon in Leipzig. Napoleon is thus remembered in Poland as an important figure in the fight for independence, even being mentioned in the second stanca of the Polish national anthem "Poland Is Not Yet Lost".

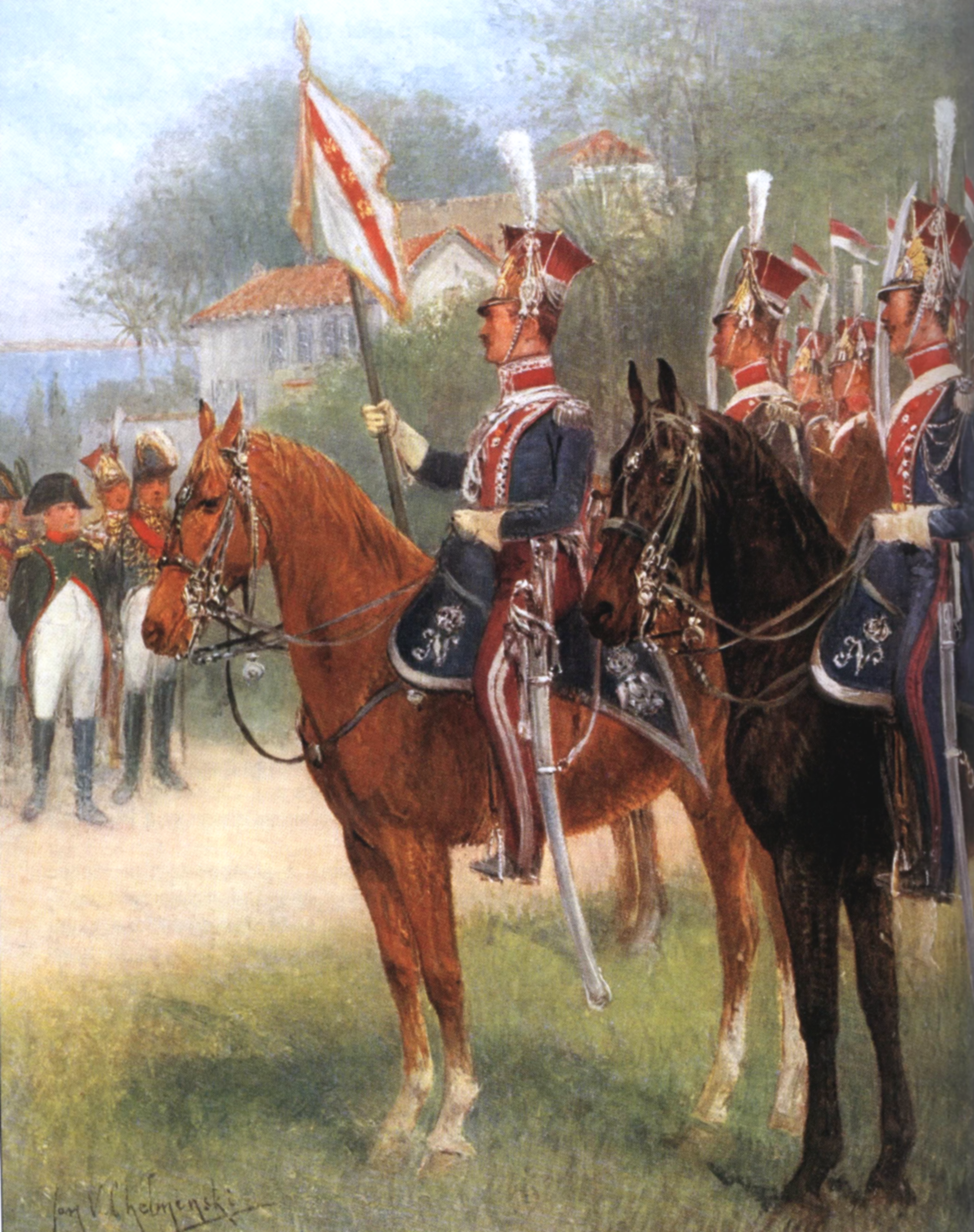
Polish Uhlans of the 1st Imperial Lancer Regiment in Elba.

==== United States ====
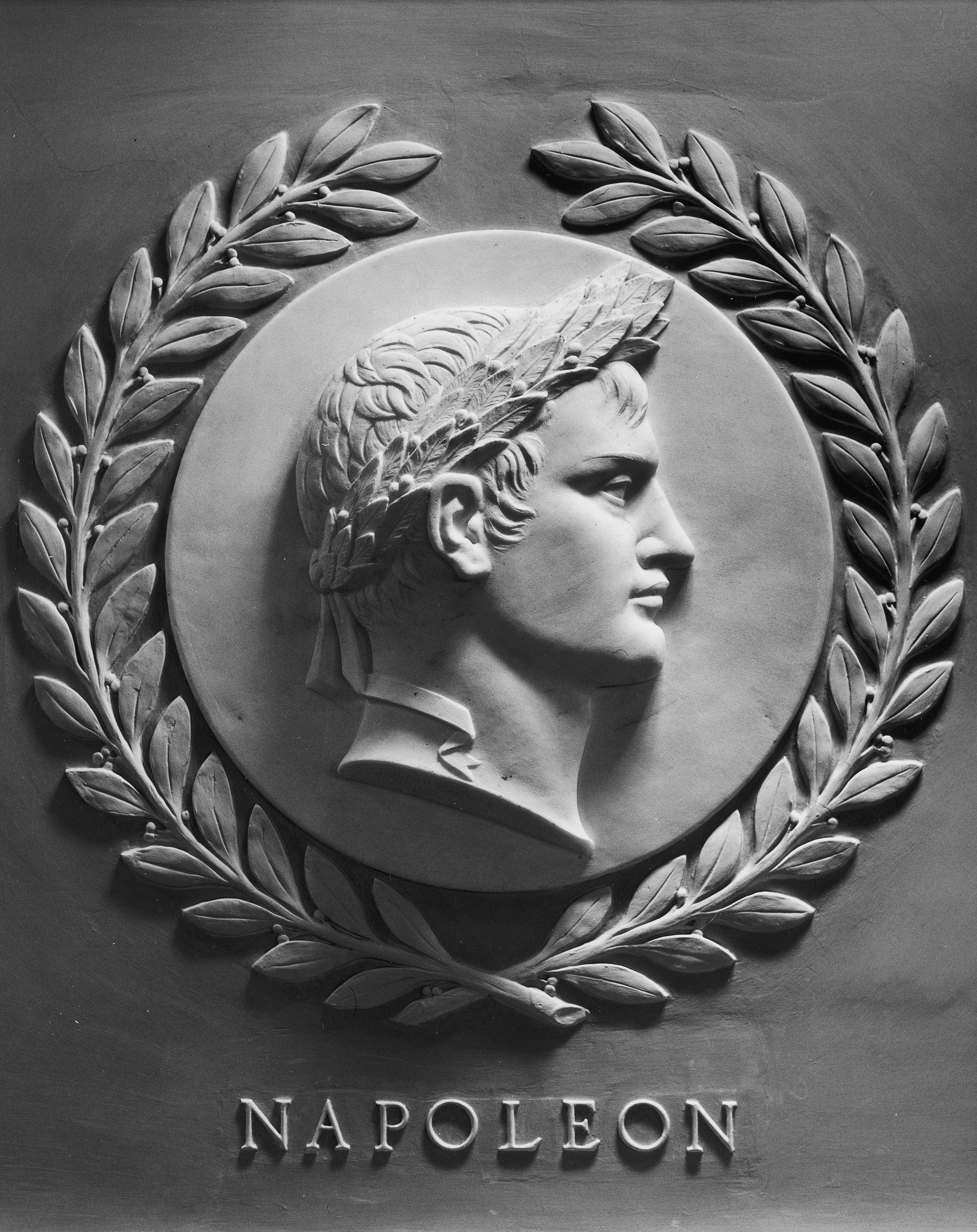
Bas-relief of Napoleon in the chamber of the United States House of Representatives

Napoleon significantly aided the United States when he agreed to sell the colony of Louisiana for $15 million during the presidency of Thomas Jefferson. The sale was motivated by Napoleon's perception that he could not defend Louisiana from British attacks. That territory opened the area west of the Mississippi River and almost doubled the size of the United States. The New England Federalists who had strongly opposed the French Revolution in the 1790s celebrated in 1815 that the old Bourbon kings had been restored.

Napoleon's memory was salient in the 1820s and 1830s. Americans read his biographies, looked at exhibits—especially copies of Jacques-Louis David's painting of his coronation. American tourists in France looked for his memorials. On the other hand, Thomas Jefferson hated Napoleon for killing off republicanism in France and returning to monarchy. As presidents, Jefferson and Madison were at several points on the verge of war with Napoleon before 1812 in response to violations of America's neutral rights such as seizing ships and cargoes and imprisoning sailors. Finally, Madison made the decision to declare war on only Britain.

== Art and politics of painting Napoleon ==
Napoleon has become a worldwide cultural icon generally associated with tactical brilliance, ambition and political power. His distinctive features and costume have made him a very recognizable figure in popular culture. He has been portrayed in many works of fiction, his depiction varying greatly with the author's perception of the historical character. In the 1927 film Napoleon, young general Bonaparte is portrayed as a heroic visionary. On the other hand, he has been occasionally reduced to a stock character, depicted as short and bossy, sometimes comically so.

Antoine-Jean Gros (1771–1835) witnessed the Battle of Arcole (1796) and painted a portrait that pleased Napoleon. After travelling with Napoleon's army, Gros produced several large paintings of battles and other events in Napoleon's life. Napoléon on the Battlefield of Eylau was a realistic portrayal of the horrors of war. According to Jill Morris, Napoleon commissioned Gros to paint Bonaparte Visiting the Plague Victims of Jaffa (1804) to counter reports of French atrocities. The reports focused on two episodes of the Egyptian campaign (1798–1800). First when he ordered the massacre of Ottoman prisoners, and second when he ordered the death by poison of French soldiers suffering from the plague. The painting showed a compassionate Napoleon visiting the sick at the plague hospital. Morris adds that Gros was probably using the disease as a metaphor for the vanity of Napoleon and his First Empire.

Jacques-Louis David already was well established in 1799 when he met Napoleon. He was commissioned to commemorate the daring crossing of the Alps. The crossing had allowed the French to surprise the Austrian army and win victory at the Battle of Marengo on 14 June 1800. Although Napoleon had crossed on a mule, he wanted to be portrayed "calm upon a fiery steed". David complied, creating five versions of Napoleon Crossing the Saint-Bernard. After the proclamation of the Empire in 1804, David became the official court painter of the regime.

Jean-Auguste-Dominique Ingres (1780–1867) was a neoclassical painter whose famous portrait of Napoleon I on his Imperial Throne, 1806, consists of a head but practically nothing of his body. It concentrated almost entirely on the lavish imperial costume that Napoleon had chosen to wear, and the symbols of power he held. The scepter of Charles V, the sword of Charlemagne the rich fabrics, furs and capes, crown of gold leaves, golden chains and emblems were all presented in extremely precise detail; the Emperor's face and hands were almost lost in the majestic costume. For Susan Siegfried (2006), the painting shows not just a man but the complexity and glory of his new empire. The insignia conveys the inter-relations of old French traditions and the new imperial formation, an empire for which Napoleon provided the brain but many others ultimately helped create. Siegfried argues that before 1789 royal portraits focused on the king's body. However,

“in the wake of the French Revolution, the signification of kingship began to be displaced from the body of the ruler to the trappings of rule. In the case of Ingres's remarkable portrait … the sacrality of the new ruler was displaced to the secular realm of history and, more specifically, to the pose, insignia, and costume that denoted the emperor's status....“The state was no longer equated with the person or the body Napoleon as the speaking subject …, but rather with the nation, via its history.”

== See also ==
- "China is a sleeping giant", a quote baselessly attributed to Napoleon
- Cultural depictions of Napoleon
- Napoleon I on His Imperial Throne, a painting of Napoleon in his coronation costume
- Napoleonland, a proposed theme park; it has not yet been approved
- Origins of the War of 1812
