= Unwoman =

- Theatrical release poster
- Directed by: Pallavi Roy
- Written by: Susheel Sharman; Pallavi Roy
- Produced by: Gunjan Goel
- Starring: Bhagwan Tiwari; Sarthak Narula; Kanak Garg; Karan Maan; Girish Pal Singh
- Cinematography: Shakil Rehan Khan
- Edited by: Gunjan Goel; Mohd Firoj Alam
- Music by: Abhay Rustum Sopori
- Production company: Hashtag Films LLP
- Distributed by: Jai Viratra Entertainment limited Manoj Nandwana
- Release date: 5 May 2023
- Running time: 112 minutes
- Country: India
- Language: Hindi

Unwoman is a Hindi/Rajasthani-language drama film produced by Gunjan Goel under the banner of Hashtag Films LLP. The film is categorised under the genre of love, social issues, LGBTQ+, and drama. The earlier name of the film was Sanwri.

== Synopsis ==
The film revolves around the life of Bhanwar, a simple man from a village in Rajasthan, whose life is dominated by his uncle Bhairo. In order to improve their living conditions, Bhairo coaxes Bhanwar to buy a bride. However, the human trafficker they contact dupes Bhanwar and sells him Sanwri, who is an intersex/transgender person. Sanwri's gentle nature gradually softens Bhanwar's heart, and their bond based on necessity turns into love. However, Bhairo treats Sanwri as an object to serve his needs, and tension arises when Bhanwar objects. Sanwri's identity is revealed, and they are forced to confront the harsh judgment, mockery, taboos, and hypocrisy of society.

== Cast ==
- Bhagwan Tiwari as Bhairo
- Kanak Garg as Sanwri
- Sarthak Narula as Bhanwar
- Girish Pal as Kaircharan
- Karan Maan as Harinder
- Pramod Deswal as Gopi

== Production ==
Pallavi Roy has directed the film. Abhay Rustom Sopori has composed the music, and Dhanraj Dadhich has penned the lyrics. Shakil Rehan Khan has handled the cinematography, while Gunjan Goel and Firoj Alam have edited the film. Abhay Rustom Sopori has also composed the background score. The film was shot in Osian, Jodhpur, and is being distributed by Manoj Nandwana of Jai Viratra Entertainment Limited.

== Accolades ==
- Northeast India International Film Festival - Best LGBTQ Film
- 6th INTERNATIONAL FOLKLORE FILM FESTIVAL 2023 @INDIA, KERALA - Official Selection
- First-Time Filmmaker Sessions - hosted by Lift-Off Global Network - Official Selection
- Paris International Film Awards - Best Director
- Toronto International Women Film Festival - Official Selection
- Seoul International Monthly Film Festival - Honorable Mention
- Merced Queer Film Festival - Best International Feature Film
- Taiwan International Queer Film Festival - Official Selection
- KASHISH Mumbai International Queer Film Festival - Official Selection
- LA Independent Women Film Awards - Official Selection
