= Bathtub refinishing =

Re-enameling process

Bathtub refinishing (also known as bathtub reglazing, bathtub resurfacing, or bathtub re-enameling) is a process of restoring the surface of a bathtub to improve its appearance and durability. It involves applying a new coating or finish on the existing bathtub surface, which can be made of materials such as porcelain, fiberglass, acrylic, or enamel.

Bathtub refinishing offers several advantages over traditional bathtub replacement. It is a more cost-effective option, as refinishing is generally less expensive than purchasing and installing a new bathtub. Additionally, the process can be completed relatively quickly, often within a day or two, minimizing disruption to the bathroom and daily routine.

== Refinishing process ==
=== Surface preparation ===
The refinishing process starts by assessing any existing damage to the bathtub and determining necessary repairs. Bathtub refinishing is only a cosmetic fix and does not fix any underlying issues. It is important to search the bathtub thoroughly and assess how severe the cracks and wear are to determine whether the tub should be replaced or refinished. A bathtub with serious rust, corrosion, or structural cracks most likely cannot be repaired properly and should be replaced. However, a bathtub with surface-level web-shaped cracks can be refinished and last many more years. If there is rust on the bathtub, then that part should be removed and treated as necessary; otherwise, the rust can spread. If the bathtub cannot hold water, chips or cracks can be filled with a polyester putty such as Bondo.

Since porcelain, enamel, and fiberglass surfaces are nonporous, they do not provide a good substrate for the new coating to attach to. Therefore, the bathtub surface is prepped with an acid etching or wet sanding, which cleans and creates a porous surface that enables mechanical adhesion. Another possible method is to apply an adhesion-promoting bonding agent like silane to the surface before applying the coating. These two methods can be used in unison or independently. The greatest adhesion is generally achieved by using both methods together; however, some newer refinishing processes claim they do not require etching, by relying on silane alone.

It is important to properly prepare the bathtub and the surrounding area to ensure no refinishing products are left behind. The chemicals used in the refinishing process can be very harmful to people. Most refinishers protect themselves and their clients by completely masking the area prior to spraying any chemical coatings. They also set up a professional exhaust system rated to work with the type of coating system being applied. By using at least a 1200-cfm (cubic feet per minute) exhaust unit, the refinisher can see better and may limit the overspray and settling on the surface. The refinisher uses a NIOSH-rated fresh-air supplied breathing apparatus and spray suit and gloves to protect themselves from the chemicals. After spraying is complete, the masking is removed, a new caulk line can be installed, and the drain replaced.

=== Coatings ===
Coatings used to create a new bathtub finish can be epoxies, urethanes, hybrid polyester-polyurethane, or polymers. Generally, a catalyzed two-component cross-link synthetic white coating is applied, but this coating lacks the durability or abrasive tolerance of the original glass enamel coating of a factory-new bathtub. Coatings may be rolled, brushed, or sprayed on. In most cases, the coating should be between 5–8 mm (0.20–0.31 in) thick when cured to provide the best, long-term results. This is typically achieved by spraying two coats of primer, followed by three coats of topcoat. A very experienced refinisher may be able to accomplish this with fewer coats depending on conditions.

In general, a professionally refinished surface will act as a new tub surface and be very slippery when wet. Therefore, a slip-resistant area can be added to the bottom of the tub during the refinishing process. Alternatively, a semi-permanent mat can be used; however, these may be more difficult to clean and do not have the life expectancy of many coating systems. Rubber mats are almost always discouraged by the manufacturers, and their use may void the warranty.

=== Cost ===
The cost of refinishing a bathtub averages $480 (2023), which is much cheaper than buying a brand-new bathtub. The cost varies depending on the bathtub material and damage.

A still cheaper option is do-it-yourself (DIY) kits which contain all of the necessary equipment for the bathtub owner to do the refinishing themselves. Typically, reglazing kits cost about $100. This approach allows the owner to have more control over how and what is done in the process, as well as save money. Despite these benefits, there are some tradeoffs such as fewer color choices, the time spent working on the bathtub, and the risk of not doing the process correctly. It ultimately comes down to the owner's decision on how much time and money they are willing to spend working on their bathtub.

== Hazards ==
Findings from the Fatality Assessment and Control Evaluation (FACE) program have identified at least 14 worker deaths since 2000 related to the usage of methylene chloride for bathtub refinishing. Products containing high percentages of methylene chloride are used as stripping agents to remove the old bathtub coating. In an unventilated setting, overexposure to methylene chloride vapors can affect brain function and result in death in the short term, with possible carcinogenic effects in the long term. Once a person can smell the methylene chloride they have already been overexposed to the chemicals.

Measures to prevent overexposure to methylene chloride include using stripping agents that rely on other chemicals, implementing adequate local exhaust ventilation, and using appropriate personal protective equipment (such as respirators). Local exhaust ventilation is necessary, as opening nearby windows and using bathroom fans will not provide enough ventilation. Using long-handled tools can also decrease workers' proximity from the product, with beneficial effects.

Professional refinishers will often provide the end-user with after-care instructions and warranty or guaranty information. Pay attention to the cleaning and care recommendations to avoid warranty issues. Cleaning in most cases can be best accomplished using a mild dish-soap degreaser (like Dawn); avoid cleaners with acids or other chemicals specified in instructions. Fill the tub with enough water to cover the bottom, mix some cleaner in, and agitate; then rub the surface with the sponge. To clean especially dirty tubs, let the cleaner sit on the surface for up to twenty minutes. This allows the cleaner to break down the dirt and oils to be more easily removed. Waxing the surface around the drain, and in other areas that are not stood or sat on, can also assist in keeping the surface like new and improve coating life. Take care not to rub on the caulk line to the point that it separates from the tub or wall surface—this will allow water to become trapped and cause peeling. Damaged caulk should always be replaced immediately.

== See also ==
- Bathroom
- Bathtub
- Home improvement
- Home repair
- Hot tub
- Jacuzzi
- Shower
