= Bathtub =

Large container for holding water in which a person may bathe

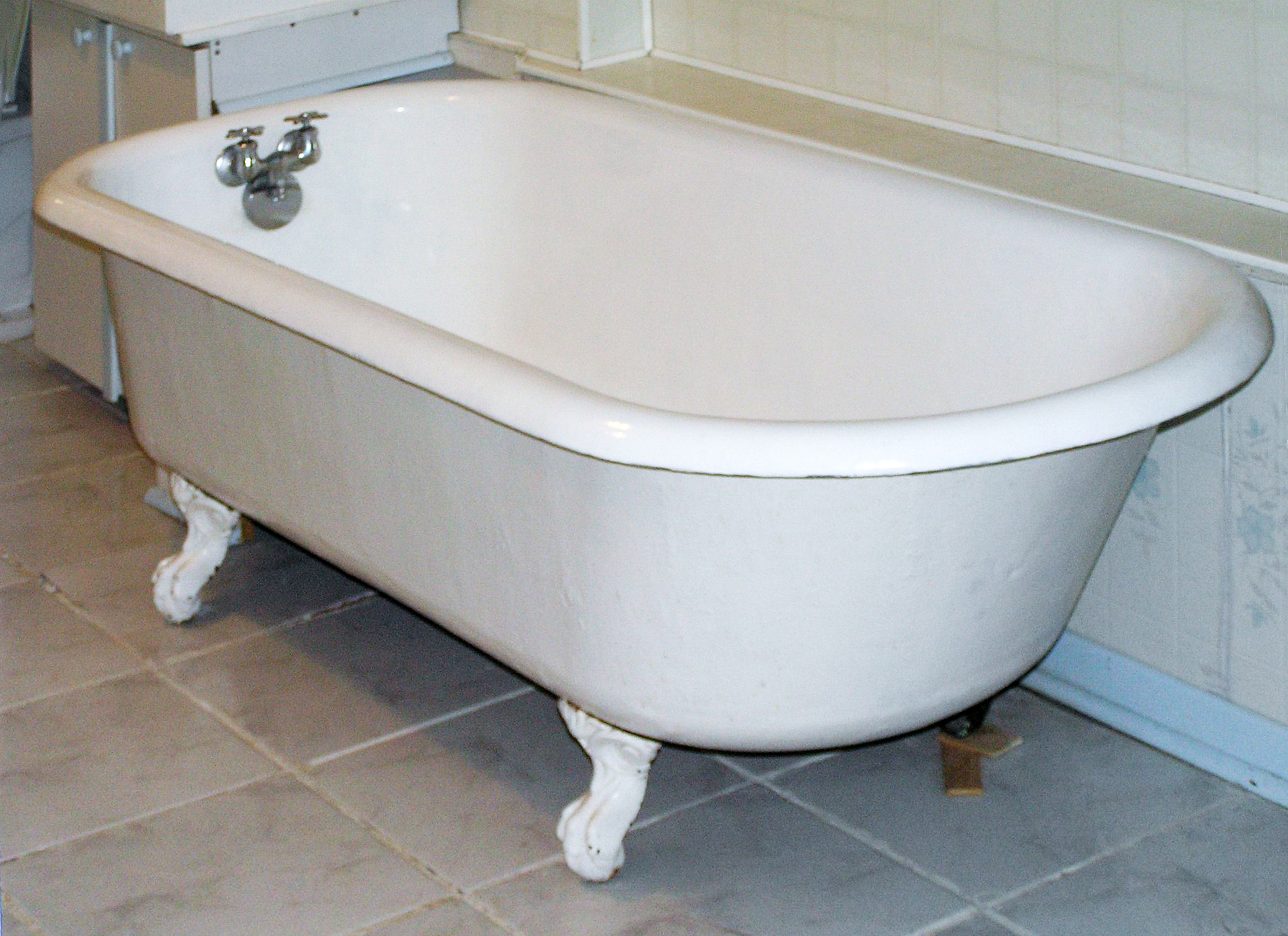
A porcelain-coated cast iron bathtub, without shower plumbing, and with "claw foot" legs attached

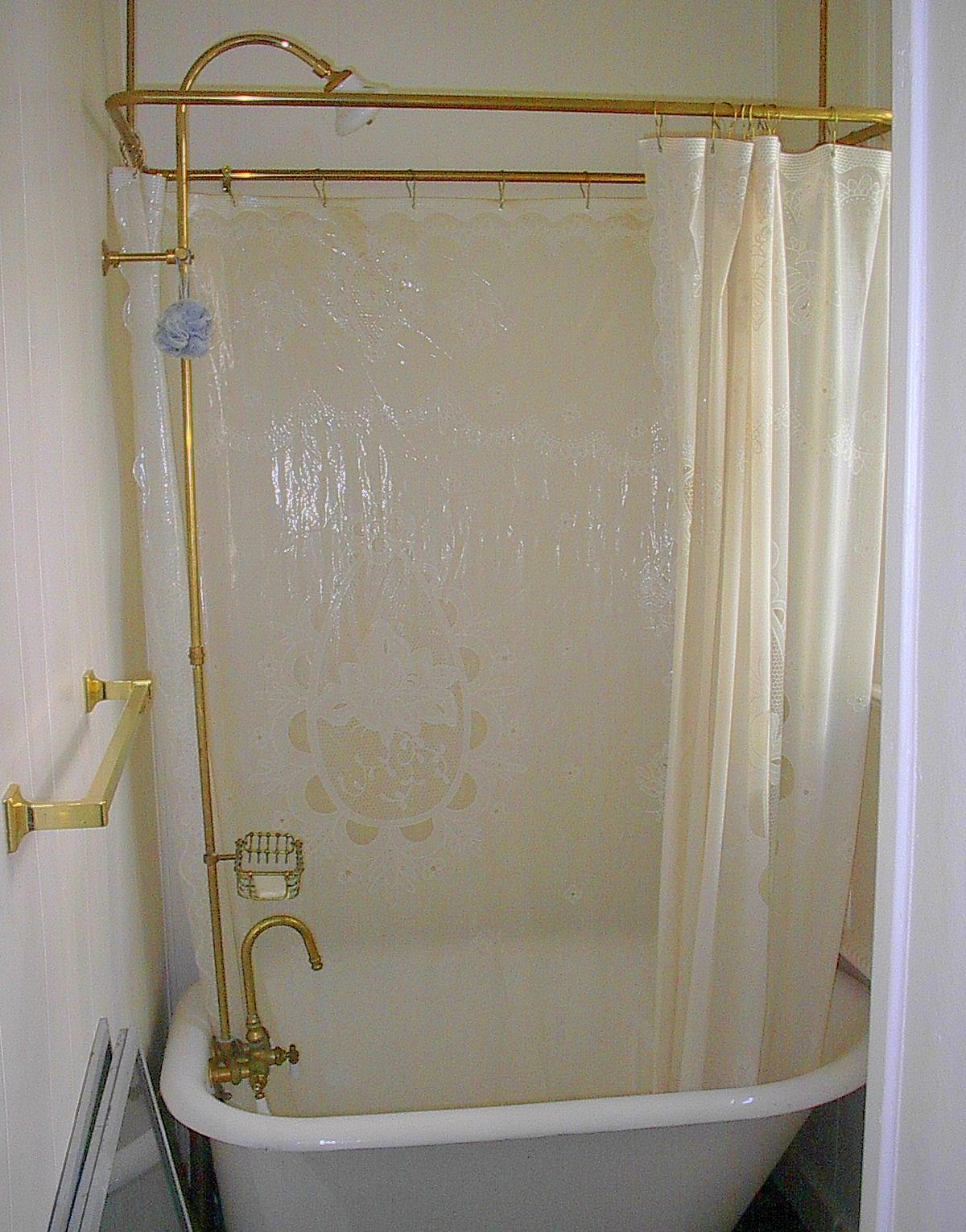
A porcelain-coated cast iron bathtub, with shower curtain fixtures, shower plumbing, soap dish, and with "claw foot" legs attached, all free-standing, fittings anchored to wall and ceiling

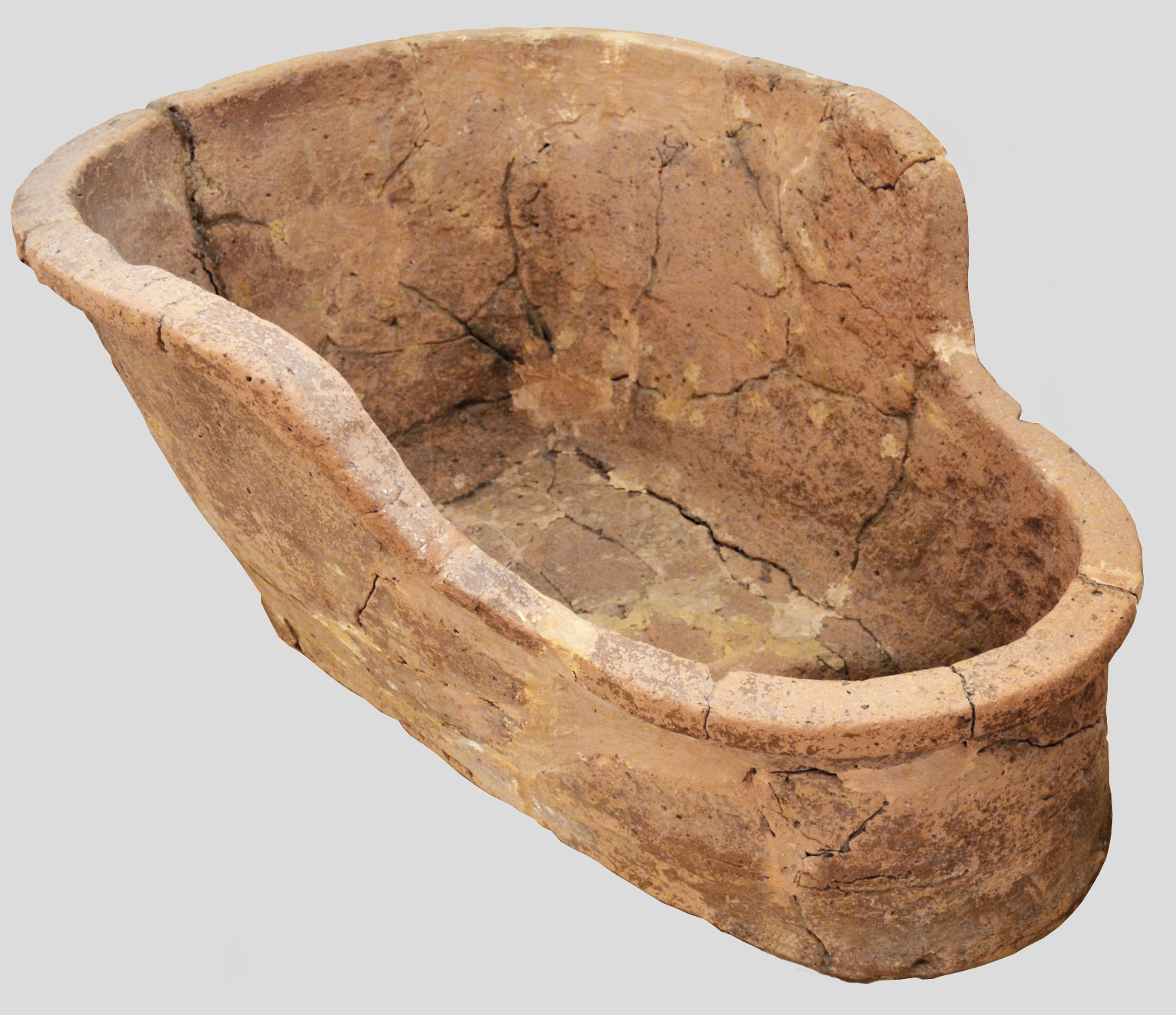
Mycenaean terra-cotta Bathtub

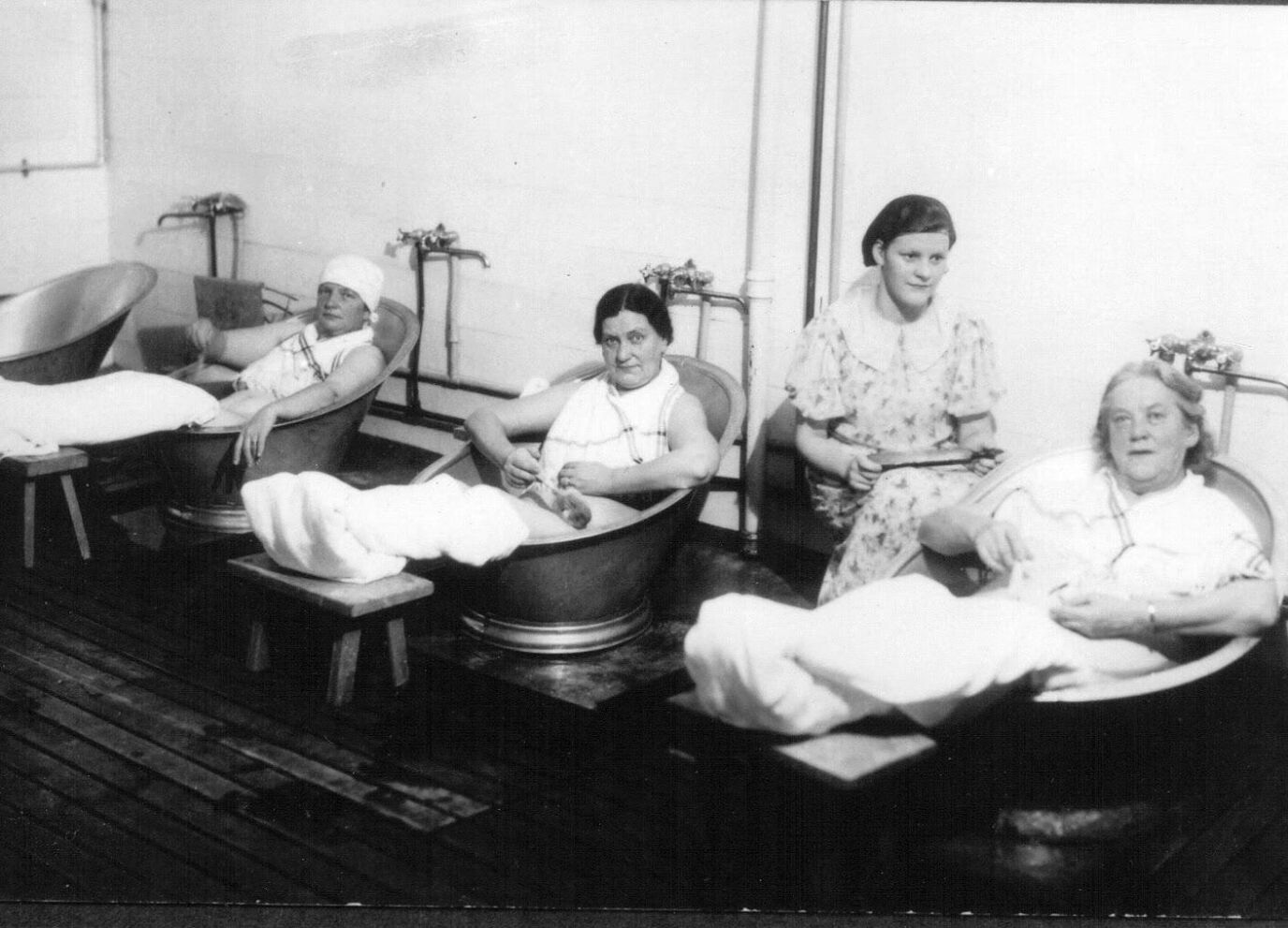
hydrotherapy sitz baths, 1910s

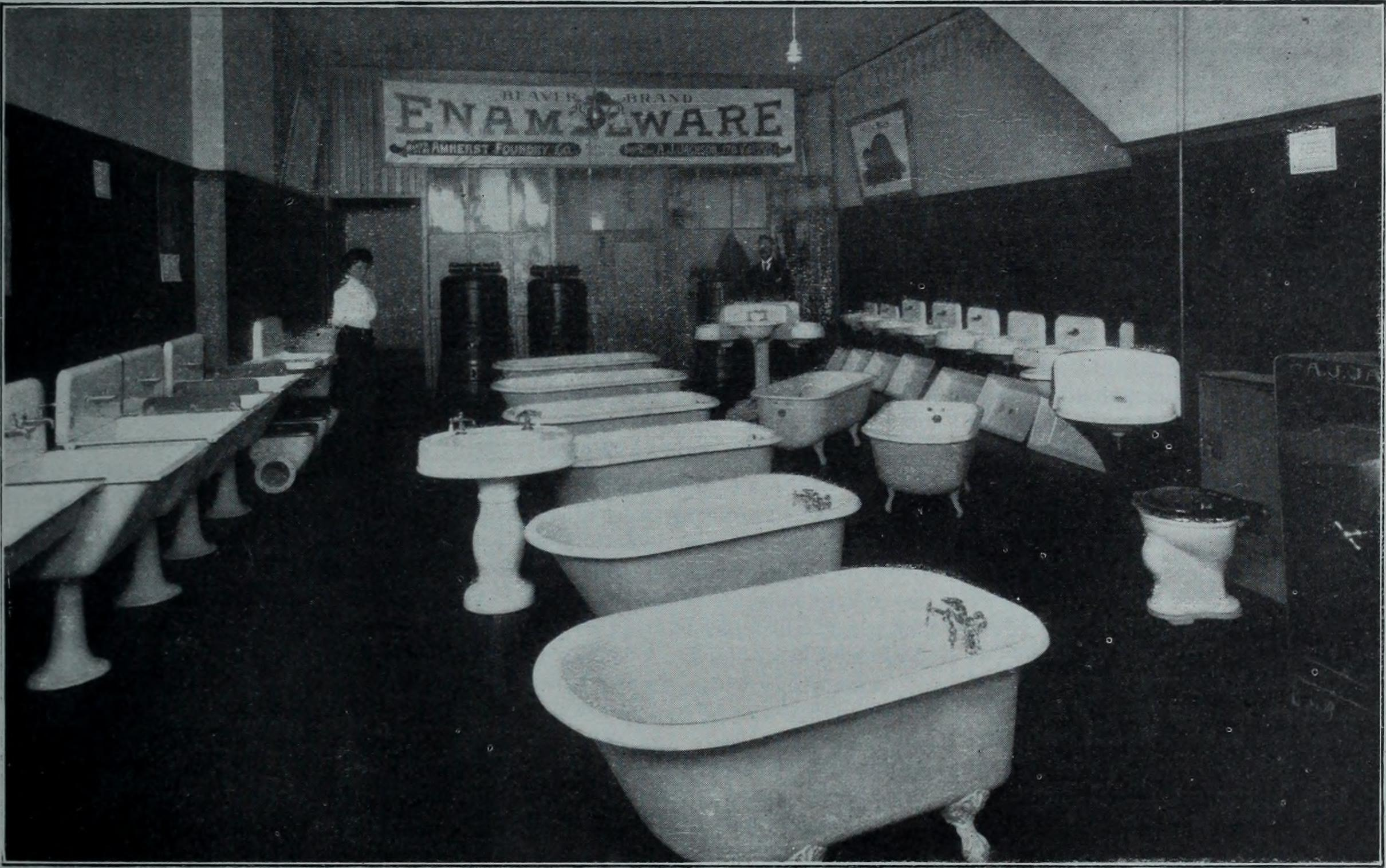
Beaver Brand Enamelware Display Room, Toronto, 1909

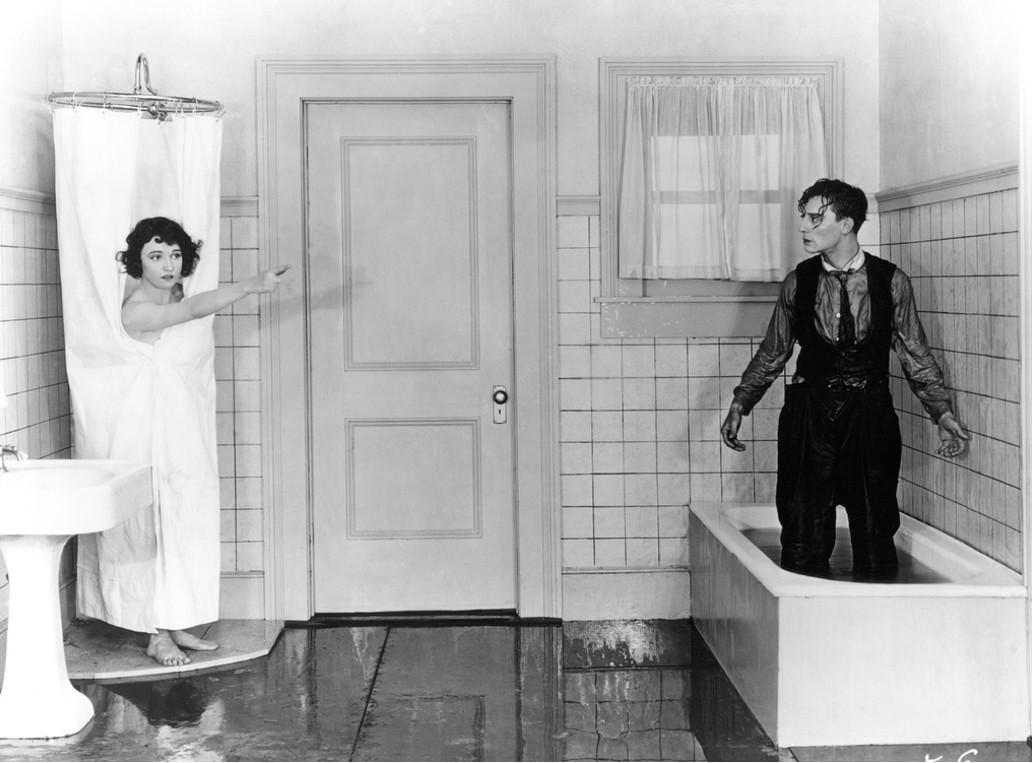
Sybil Seely showers and Buster Keaton bathes, in One Week (1920)

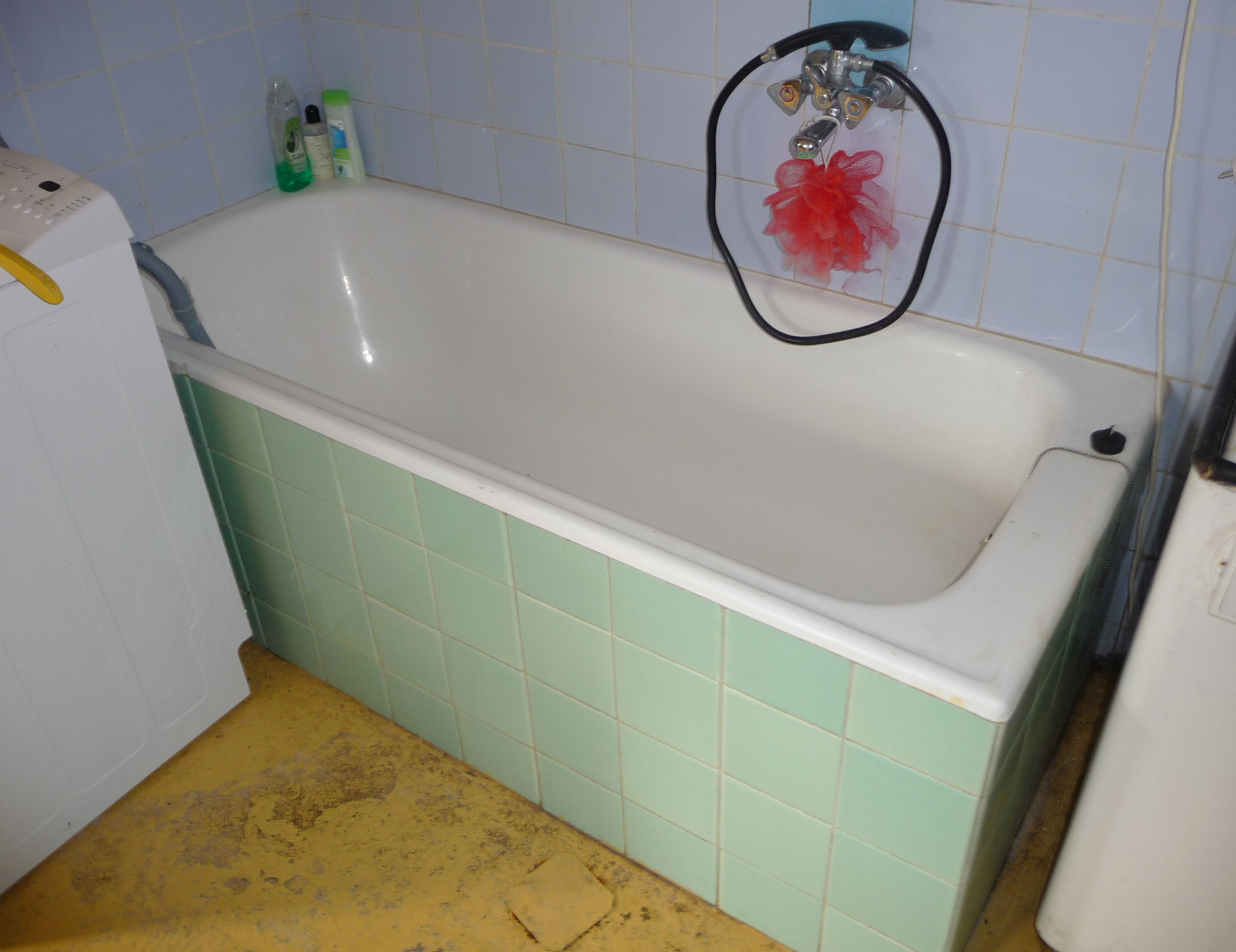
Bathtub with hand shower hose, water faucet in wall, Czech Republic

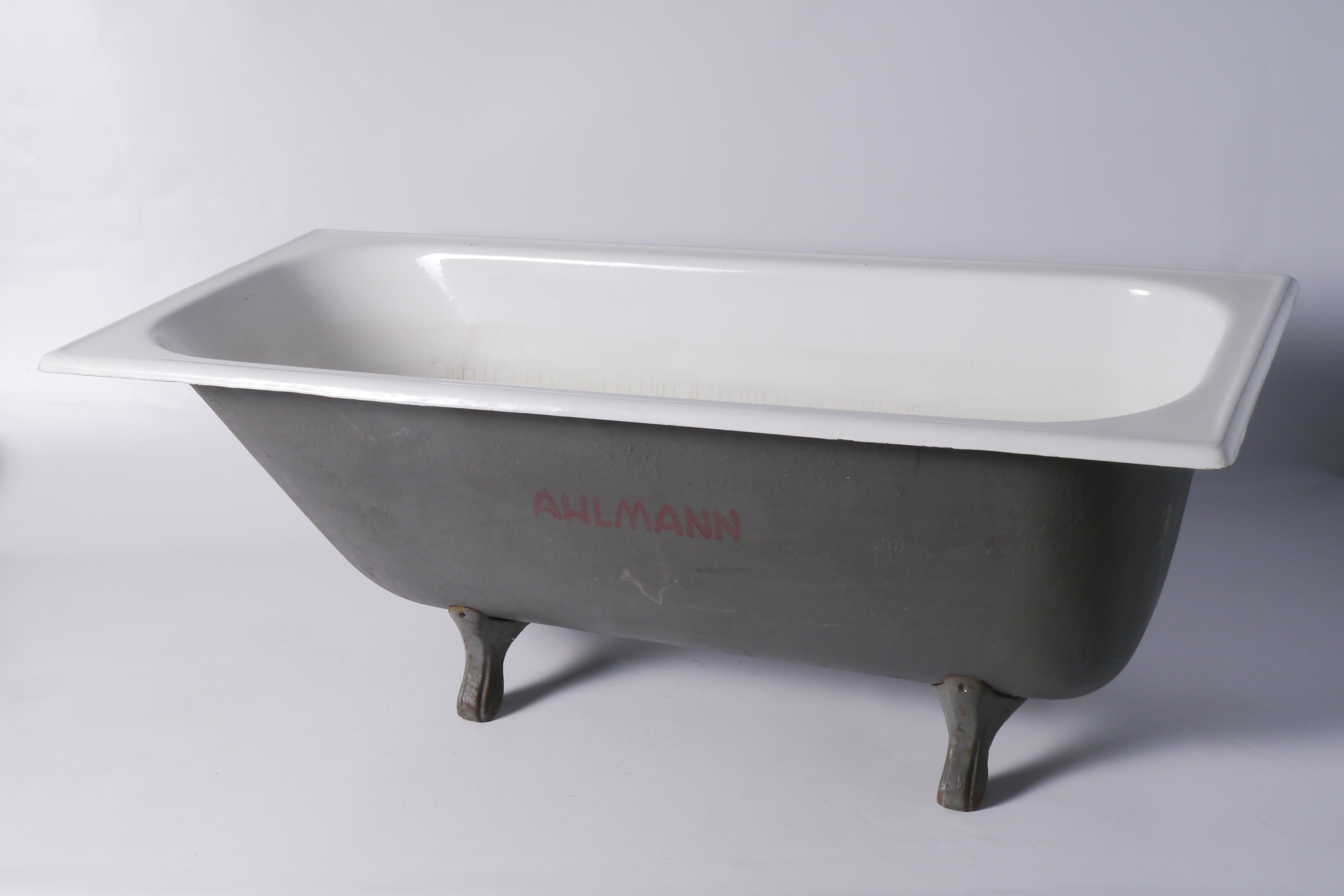
Bathtub from the brand Ahlmann | Collection Museum of Industry Ghent

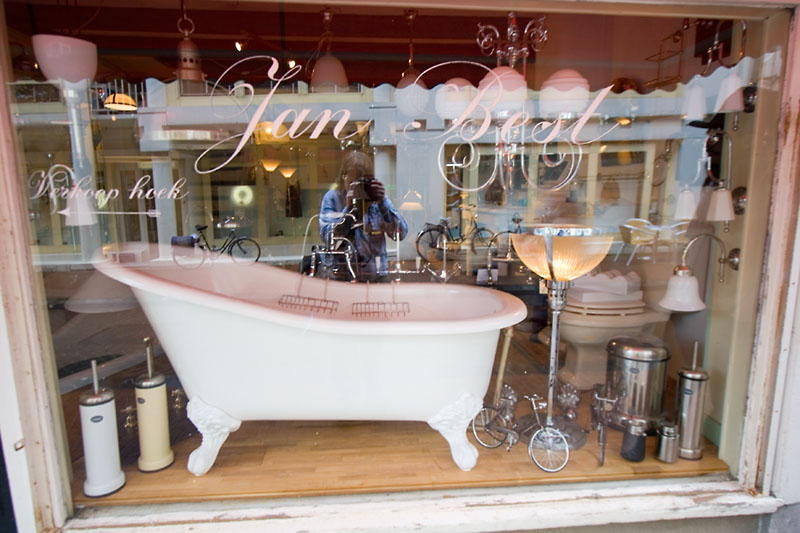
Slipper bathtub (Slipper bath in the UK)

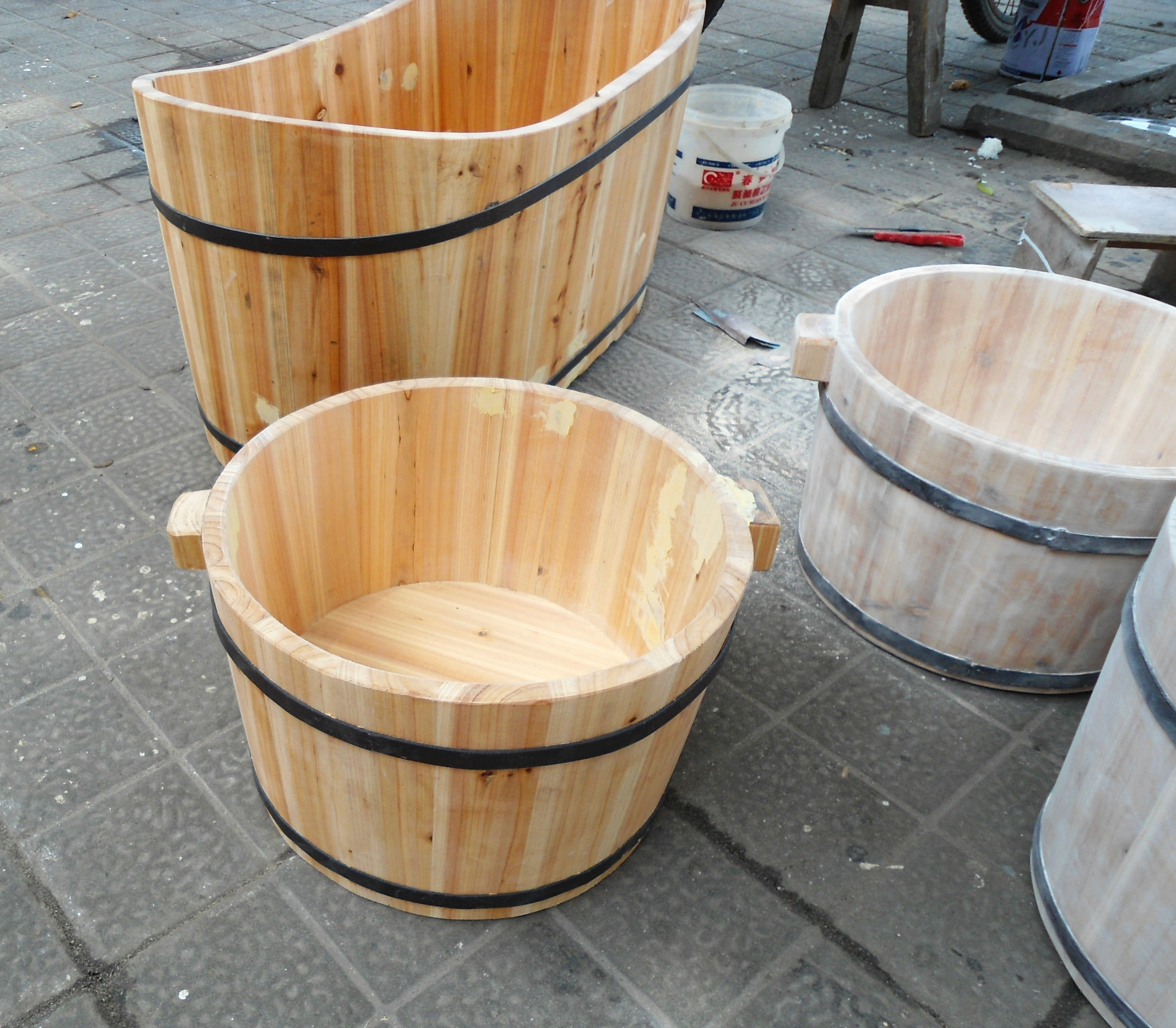
Wooden bathtubs for children and infants in Haikou, Hainan, China

A bathtub, also abbreviated as bath or tub, is a container for holding water in which a person or another animal may bathe. Modern bathtubs can be made of thermoformed acrylic, porcelain-enameled steel or cast iron, or fiberglass-reinforced polyester. A bathtub is usually placed in a bathroom, either as a stand-alone fixture or in conjunction with shower plumbing.

== Styles ==
Two main styles are common:

- Western style bathtubs in which the bather lies down. These baths are typically shallow and long.
- Eastern style bathtubs in which the bather sits up. These are known as furo in Japan and are typically short and deep.

== Drain orientation ==
Modern bathtubs have overflow and waste drains, as right-hand drain, left-hand drain, center drain, and reversible drain.

== Structure ==
Modern bathtubs may have hot and cold water valves mounted on them. Bathtubs are now usually built-in but have been freestanding or sometimes sunken. Until acrylic thermoforming technology permitted other shapes, most Western culture bathtubs used to be shaped like a chaise-longue-shaped stock tank. Bathtubs are commonly white in color (porcelain), although many other colors can be found.

== History of bathtubs and bathing ==
Documented early plumbing systems for bathing go back as far as around 3300 BC with the discovery of copper water pipes beneath a palace in ancient Europe. Evidence of the earliest surviving personal sized bathtub was found on the Isle of Crete where a 1.5-metre (5 ft) long pedestal tub was found built from hardened pottery.

The clawfoot bathtub had design origins in the Netherlands. The design spread to England, as Hydrotherapy became fashionable. Early bathtubs in England were made of cast iron, or tin and copper, with a coat of paint that tended to peel with time.

Vitreous enamel was first applied commercially to sheet iron and steel in Austria and Germany in about 1850.

Following a fire in 1880 ......One of their first enameled products was a bathtub made by applying a porcelain coating to a cast iron horse trough.

"The clawfoot tub was popular from the 1880's to the 1930's. It was the flu epidemic after WWI that was the downfall of these beautiful fixtures. People knew little about the illness, and became concerned with germs and cleanliness. Many saw the hard-to-reach spaces behind and under the tubs as potential breeding grounds for germs. While this wasn't true, it did cause changes in bathroom design." - Pelham & White

In 1912, the William Howard Taft administration broke up the porcelain trust, a cartel of price-fixers that conspired to create a monopoly on toilets and bathroom fixtures using patent licenses to manipulate porcelain fixture costs. In 1912, Taft fought a bitter election against Woodrow Wilson and Theodore Roosevelt, with campaigns taking aim at Taft's weight, resulting in the bathtub fallacy.

The Crane Company introduced colored bathroom fixtures to the United States market in 1928, and slowly this influx of design options and easier cleaning and care led to the near demise of clawfoot-style bathtubs.

James R. Wheeler and his brother Richard in 1979 adapted the acrylic being used for outdoor spas to make acrylic bathtubs. Working with Spartech Plastics, they developed the modern co-extruded and durable acrylic bathtub. The company American Bath Factory was the first to expand the diversity of acrylic bathtubs to include whirlpools, clawfoot bathtubs, and a large variety of pedestal and modern bathtubs.

== Cleansing ==
=== Clawfoot bathtubs ===
The clawfoot bathtub was considered a luxury item in the late 19th century, originally made from cast iron and lined with porcelain. Modern technology has contributed to a drop in the price of clawfoot bathtubs, which may now be made of fiberglass, acrylic or other modern materials. Clawfoot bathtubs usually require more water than a standard bathtub, because generally they are larger. While true antique clawfoot bathtubs are still considered collectible items, new reproduction clawfoot bathtubs are chosen by remodelers and new home builders and much like the Western-style bathtubs, clawfoot bathtubs can also include a variety of shower head options.

Clawfoot bathtubs come in four major styles:

- Classic roll rim bathtubs, also called roll top bathtubs or flat rim bathtubs as seen in the picture at the top of this page.
- Slipper bathtubs, generally known as slipper baths in the UK, where one end is raised and sloped creating a more comfortable lounging position.
- Double slipper bathtubs – where both ends are raised and sloped.
- Double ended bathtubs – where both ends of the bathtub are rounded, as opposed to the classic roll rim bathtub, which has one rounded end and one fairly flat end.

=== Pedestal bathtubs ===
Pedestal bathtubs rest on a pedestal in what many would term an art deco style. Evidence of pedestal bathtubs dates back to the island of Crete around 1000 BC.

=== Baby bathtub ===
A baby bathtub is one used for bathing infants, especially those not yet old enough to sit up on their own. These can be either a small, stand-alone bath that is filled with water from another source, or a device for supporting the baby that is placed in a standard bathtub. Many are designed to allow the baby to recline while keeping its head out of the water.

=== Soft bathtubs ===
Soft tubs are made from soft plastic or foam with a protective non-slip coating. While soft tubs have been available since the 1970s, by the 1990s they were being sold by major manufacturers. The tubs are typically marketed for children and the elderly, to prevent injury from falls.

=== Inflatable bathtubs ===
Inflatable bathtubs are portable bathtubs that can be used indoors and outdoors. Some models have built-in accessories such as pillows, backrests, armrests, and cupholders, which are all air-inflated. In general, inflatable bathtubs usually consist of many smaller inflatable parts, together forming a bathtub.

== Recreation and therapy ==
=== Hot tubs ===
Hot tubs are common heated pools used for relaxation and sometimes for therapy. Hot tubs were popular in the U.S. from 1967–1980, appearing in films and music.

=== Whirlpool tubs ===
Whirlpool tubs first became popular in the U.S. during the 1960s and 1970s. A spa or hot tub can also be called a "jacuzzi" after plumbing component manufacturer Jacuzzi introduced the "Spa Whirlpool" in 1968. Air bubbles may be introduced into the nozzles via an air-bleed venturi pump.

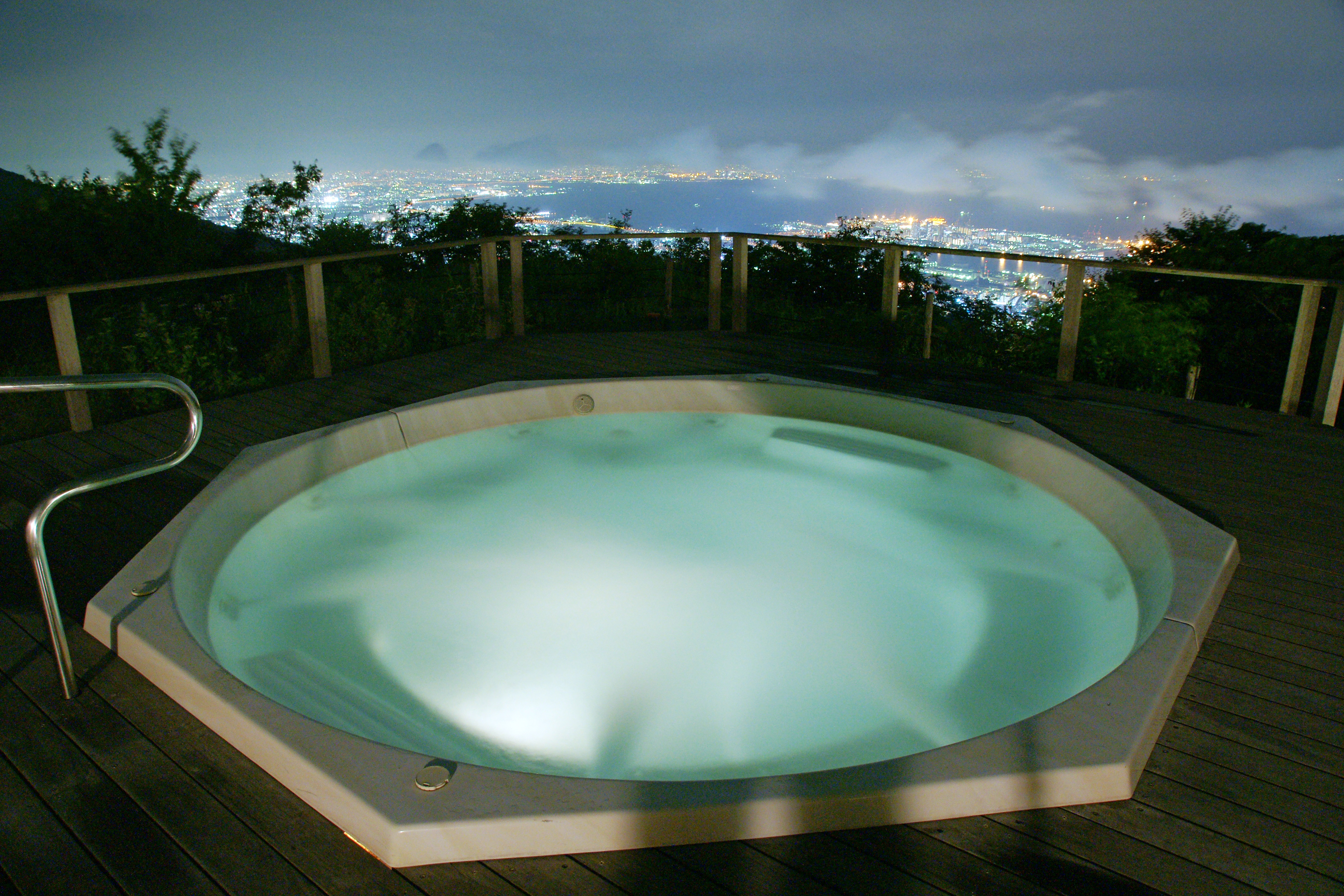
Jacuzzi whirlpool bathtub

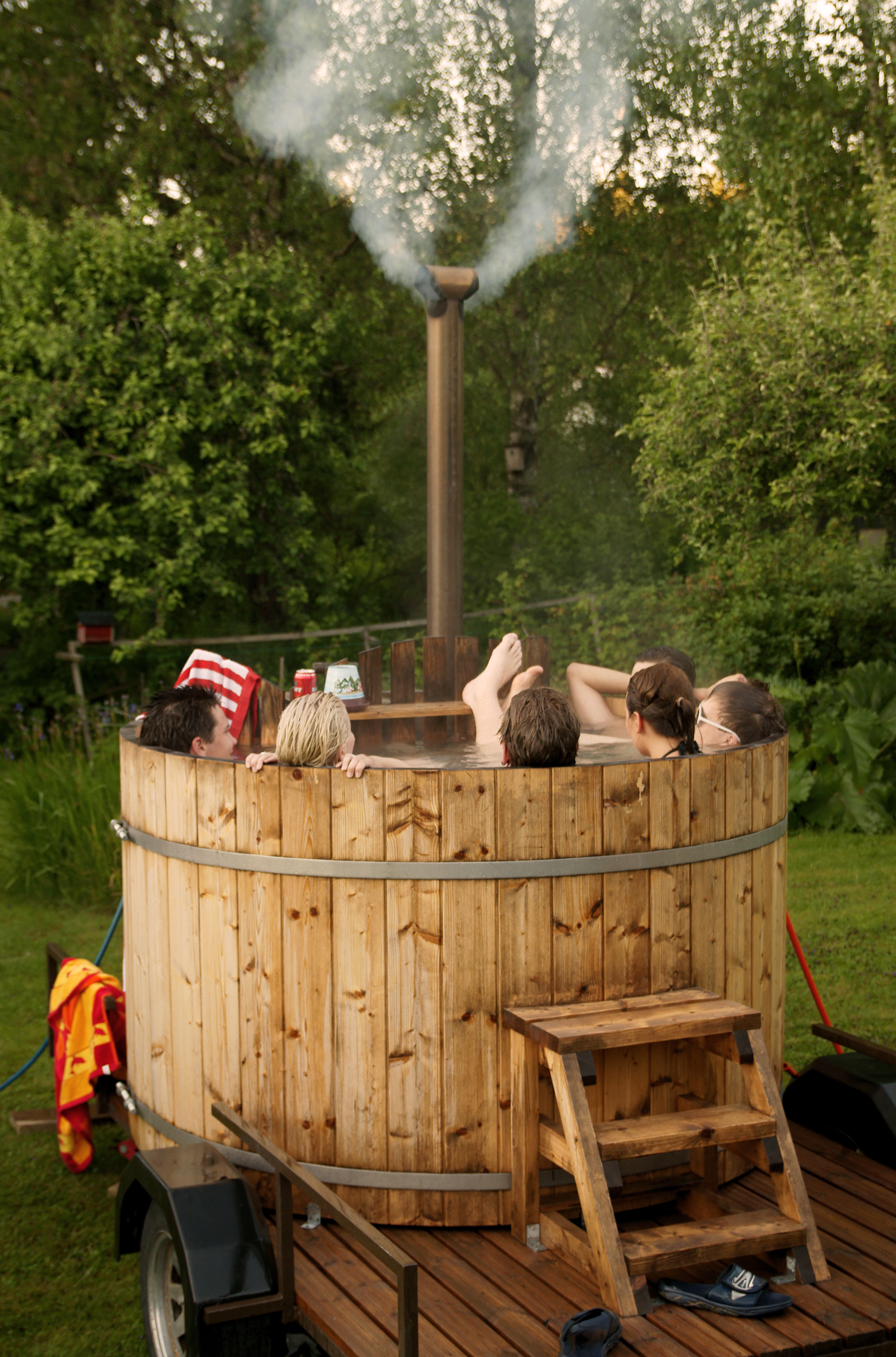
Wooden hot tub on a trailer in Finland

== See also ==
- Accessible bathtub
- Bath bomb
- Bathtub curve
- Bathtub hoax
- Bathtub refinishing
- Coriolis force#Draining in bathtubs and toilets
- Plug (sanitation)
