= Gin Ke Dus =

- Poster of Gin Ke Dus
- Directed by: Sareesh Sudhakaran
- Screenplay by: Sareesh Sudhakaran
- Story by: Sareesh Sudhakaran
- Produced by: Sareesh Sudhakaran
- Starring: Avinash Gupta; Trishana Goswami; Himanshu Shekhar; Sanjana Deshmukh; Anika Arya; Akshay Ravi; Zahid Ahmed Khan; Aniket Jadhav; Kailash Pal; Muskan Khurana
- Cinematography: Sareesh Sudhakaran
- Edited by: Sareesh Sudhakaran
- Music by: Sareesh Sudhakaran
- Production company: The Indie Farm
- Distributed by: Jai Viratra Entertainment Limited
- Release date: 15 March 2024
- Country: India
- Language: Hindi

Gin Ke Dus is a thriller film produced and directed by Sareesh Sudhakaran.

The film was released theatrically on 15 March 2024, under the banner of The Indie Farm and distributed in India by Manoj Nandwana of Jai Viratra Entertainment Limited.

== Synopsis ==
On a May morning in 1991, at a remote Indian farmhouse, a silent killer strikes, leaving two men dead. Scholar, who is spared, buries them and later his buries his estranged wife, Attika, who is strangled by the same hand. Three friends from the city, connected to Attika's missing twin, Shyali, arrive and impose on Scholar. Hottie nearly dies while uncovering the truth. Scholar escapes, but the killer, hidden, continues his spree. Shyali finds her family gone.

In a desolate town, Scholar's betrayal leads to his death. The friends, confronting Scholar's brother, discover the bodies. One by one, they fall, leaving Shyali to face the killer alone. Amidst their stay, dangerous truths surface, leading to betrayal and a deadly confrontation that changes everything.

== Cast ==
- Avinash Gupta as Husband
- Trishana Goswami as Attika/Shyali
- Himanshu Shekhar as Scholar
- Sanjana Deshmukh as Hottie
- Anika Arya as Girlfriend
- Akshay Ravi as Roundo
- Zahid Ahmed Khan as Caretaker
- Aniket Jadhav as Autorickshaw Driver
- Kailash Pal as Father-in-law
- Muskan Khurana as Mystery Woman

== Production ==
The film is produced and directed by Sareesh Sudhakaran. Sareesh Sudhakaran has also given the cinematography, screenplay, dialogue, music, editing, background score. Hindi dialogues are by Amjad Ali, Costumes are by Kimaya and the Action Director is Hanif Sheikh (late).

Gin Ke Dus is an homage to Giallo films from Italy from the 70s, specifically the work of Dario Argento. Where this film differs is in the lack of gore. This aspect of the film is heavily influenced by the early American slasher genre, specifically Halloween (1978) and The Texas Chainsaw Massacre (1974) - two films with surprisingly little gore.

== Music ==
The music is composed by Sareesh Sudhakaran. It was released on 5 March 2024 on multiple platforms worldwide.

Track listing
No.	Title	Length
1.	"Battle Cry"	1:23
2.	"Radio Stops Time"	4:16
3.	"Angry Young Man"	1:38
4.	"Moving Shadows"	1:03
5.	"Sister vs Sister"	4:02
6.	"Battle Cry (Mellow)"	2:21
Total length:		14:42

== Release ==
The film received an A rating from the Central Board of Film Certification and was theatrically released on 15 March 2024.

== Reception ==
Reviews were mixed. Critics generally praised the cinematography and music but criticized the plot, direction and acting. Times Now rated 3/5 stars and applauded "Director Sareesh Sudhakaran delivers suspense, building tension with each passing scene." Siraj Syed of Filmfestivals.com rated the film 2.5/5 and wrote "Highly stylised, the film grabs your attention right from the beginning, and except for an unconvincing second half, where it leaves ten questions unanswered, is worth a watch."

Conversely, Dhaval Roy of The Times of India rated the film 1/5 and stated "As the first half moves sluggishly, the second half momentarily picks up, but the thrill fizzles out sooner rather than later. Sareesh Sudhakaran does a tad better in the cinematography and background music departments. Some scenes and the atmosphere are captured decently". Jyothi Venkatesh of Cine Blitz rated the film 2/5 and stated "Though the producer-director Sareesh Sudhakaran is good as far as cinematography and background music department are concerned, especially since some scenes as well as the eerie atmosphere have been captured decently, the film leaves a lot to be desired, as far as both the inept content as well as the niche treatment are concerned."
