= China is a sleeping giant =

Quote baselessly attributed to Napoleon

"China is a sleeping giant, when she wakes she will shake the world", or "China is a sleeping dragon" or "China is a sleeping lion", is a phrase widely attributed (albeit without evidence) to Napoleon Bonaparte. The quote is often labelled as "attributed" to Napoleon or given with a warning that he may not have said it. Napoleon specialist and Fondation Napoléon historian Peter Hicks declares that Napoleon never said "Laissons la Chine dormir, car quand elle se réveillera, le monde tremblera" ("Let China sleep, for when she awakes, the world will tremble"), and Australian National University historian John Fitzgerald states that "in all likelihood, Napoleon never uttered the words that legend now attributes to him about China. There is no reference to a sleeping dragon in his recorded speeches or writings and no mention of the terrible fate in store for the world should China suddenly 'wake up.'"

The quote appears in various forms, as shown in the examples below. The oldest known quotation with the English wording "China is a sleeping giant" appeared in the New York Journal of Commerce in 1888 without reference to Napoleon: "China is a sleeping giant in a certain sense, but railroads and steam power are effective awakeners for such sleepers." The oldest cited English quotation for "China is a sleeping lion" is from The Sydney Morning Herald in 1890 and references Napoleon, but only indirectly, describing a speech by Patrick O'Sullivan of the Legislative Assembly of Queensland: "O'Sullivan considered China a sleeping lion, liable at any moment to be awakened by a Mahomet, a Napoleon, or a Cromwell."

== Claim for Lord William Amherst ==
Some speculate, without giving documentation, that Napoleon made such a statement to Lord William Amherst (or that Amherst said that he did). Amherst made a diplomatic visit to China and had an audience with the emperor and saw Napoleon in exile on St. Helena in 1817. For instance, William Safire's Political Dictionary cites a 1978 Wall Street Journal column which says Napoleon made the remark to Lord Amherst, but the column gives no source for the reference. Alain Peyrefitte's The Immobile Empire, a study of British delegations to China in the late 18th century based on extensive research in French and English language sources, gives a detailed account of Amherst's conversations with Napoleon with no mention of such a quote. He attributes this "famous prediction" to Napoleon but not as part of the conversation with Amherst and he also gives no source.

Elizabeth Knowles, editor of What They Didn't Say: A Book of Misquotations (Oxford University Press) cites a similar remark the exiled emperor made to Barry O'Meara, his surgeon. O'Meara in conversation criticised Amherst for failing to convince the Chinese emperor to open China to trade. He suggested to Napoleon that "we could easily compel the Chinese to grant good terms by means of a few ships of war; that, for example, we could deprive them altogether of salt, by a few cruisers properly stationed", but Napoleon disagreed, "It would be the worst thing you have done for a number of years, to go to war with an immense empire like China, and possessing so many resources. You would doubtless, at first succeed, take what vessels they have, and destroy their trade; but you would teach them their own strength. They would be compelled to adopt measures to defend themselves against you; they would consider, and say, 'we must try to make ourselves equal to this nation. Why should we suffer a people, so far away, to do as they please to us? We must build ships, we must put guns into them, we must render ourselves equal to them.' They would get artificers, and ship builders, from France, and America, and even from London; they would build a fleet, and, in the course of time, defeat you." Knowles remarks that "the essential idea is here, if not, frustratingly, the figure of speech".

== Claim for Vladimir Lenin ==
Peyrefitte writes in Quand la Chine s'éveillera… le monde tremblera that Vladimir Lenin used the expression in 1923, and that it must therefore be older than that and therefore must be authentic. Hicks reports that there is no reference to Napoleon in that pamphlet, and that Lenin could not have had access to Amherst's journals in any case.

== Uses and significance ==
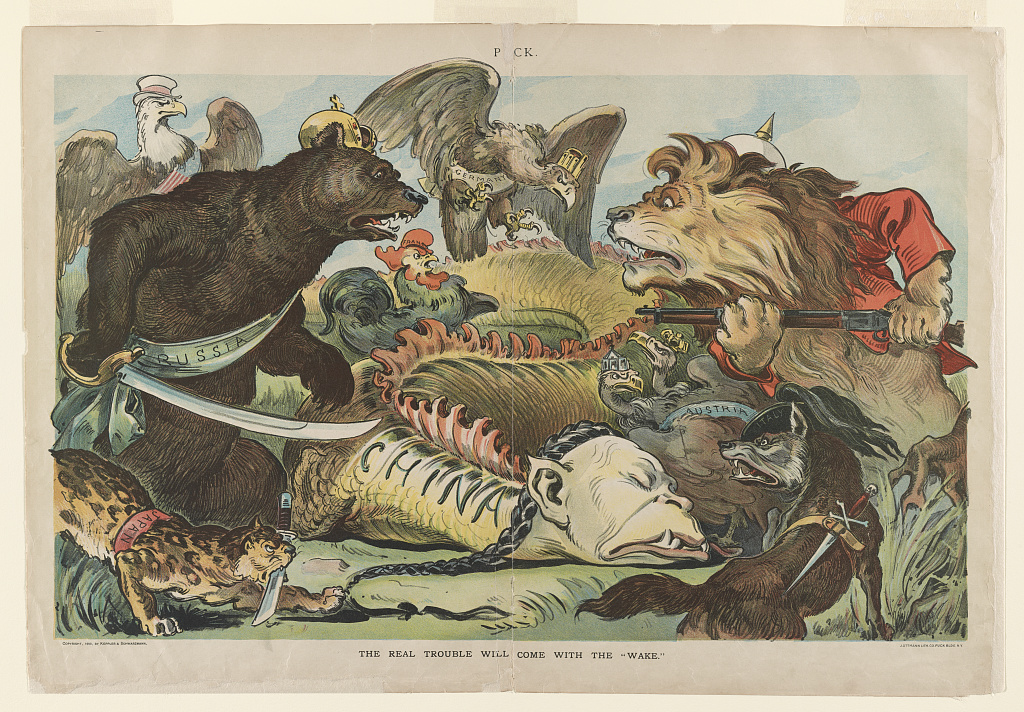
A political cartoon from Puck depicting the "China Question": the division of the weak Qing Empire—depicted as a sleeping Chinese dragon.

The metaphor of "China asleep" and "China awakened" became widespread during the 19th century and remains so today. Chinese diplomat Zeng Jize's 1887 profile, "China: the Sleep, and the Awakening", originally published in the Asiatic Quarterly Review, was widely noticed in the West. Fitzgerald says "awakening" meant a different thing in the European Age of Enlightenment, where it meant "awakening to reason and to universal human values", from what it meant in later times where could mean the awakening of peoples in colonial states to their predicament of oppression and awakening to the key to their emancipation. The thought gained power by associating it with Napoleon, one of modern history's most heroic figures. Safire says that implicit in the expression is "the idea that the sleeping giant will soon assert a previously unused power."

== Examples in popular culture ==
In 1911, William T. Ellis wrote: "Napoleon is reported to have said: 'There sleeps China! God pity us if she wakes. Let her sleep!' The commonest figure of speech concerning the Empire has been that of a sleeping giant: 'the awakening of China' is a stereotyped phrase." In 1927, the quote reported thusly, "China's asleep. Let her sleep. When she awakes, she'll shake the world", and attributed to Napoleon. The cover of Time magazine (1 December 1958) says, "Let China sleep. For when she awakens, the world will be sorry", again attributing it to Napoleon.

In the 1963 Allied Artists film 55 Days at Peking, set during the Boxer Rebellion of 1900, the British Ambassador Sir Arthur Robinson, after being told by his wife "Remember what Napoleon said," replies, "I will never forget it: 'Let China sleep. For when she wakes, the world will tremble'". The screenplay is based on the novel by Noel Gerson, where the quote does not appear. Hicks concludes that one of the screenwriters, Benard Gordon, must have supplied it.

"When China wakes, it will shake the world" is the epigraph on title page of Nicholas Kristof and Sheryl WuDunn's China Wakes, noted as "attributed to Napoleon". The note for that page gives no source but says the quote "apparently does not appear in any of his collected writings", and he "is said" (without a reference as to who said it) to have made the remark after reading Lord Macartney's account of his trip to China in 1793. The 2018 film Crazy Rich Asians begins with the quote. CCP General Secretary Xi Jinping remarked "China is a sleeping lion. When it wakes the world will tremble" in Paris on 27 March 2014.

== See also ==
- Chinese word for "crisis"
- Great Wall of China hoax
- The Great Wall viewable from space
- Isoroku Yamamoto's sleeping giant quote
- May you live in interesting times
- Yogi Berra "Yogi-isms"
- Wikiquote:George Bernard Shaw#Misattributed
- Wikiquote:Winston Churchill#Misattributed
