= Murder at Koh e Fiza =

Murder at Koh E Fiza
- Directed by: Divaker Naik
- Story by: Badrish Patil, Manoj Nandwana
- Produced by: Manoj Nandwana
- Starring: Shreya Narayan; Amitryaan; Sunny Chouhan
- Edited by: Jitendra K Shah
- Music by: Aakash Joy Chanda
- Production company: Jai Viratra Entertainment Limited
- Release date: 24 November 2022
- Country: India
- Language: Hindi

Murder at Koh E Fiza is a 2022 Hindi language film starring Amitryaan and Shreya Narayan. The film is produced under the banner of Jai Viratra Entertainment limited.

== Production ==
Murder at Koh E Fiza is Directed by Divakar Naik and produced by Manoj Nandwana and Jai Viratra Entertainment. Screenplay and dialogue by Badrish Patil, music by Aakash Joy Chanda, lyrics by Rahul Goenka.Background score by Aditya Bedekar, edited by Jitendra K Shah and cinematography by Dipak Nayak. The film released on 24th Nov 2022.

== Cast ==
- Shreya Narayan as Kangana
- Akram Khan as Rajveer Singh
- Amitryaan as Vikram Malhotra
- Sunny Singh as Udai Saxena
