= Shreya Narayan =

Indian actress

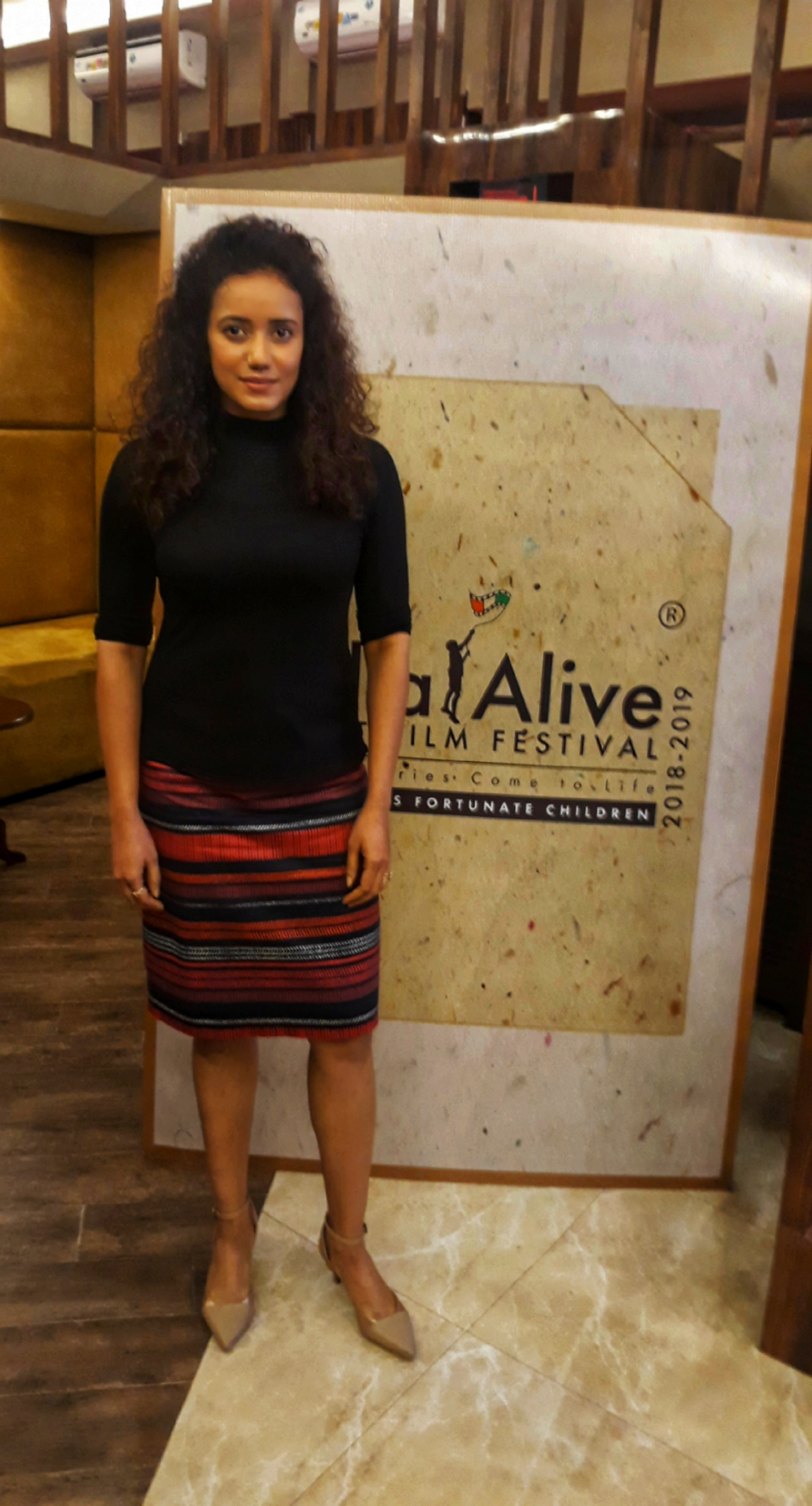
- Narayan at I Am National Award bash
- Born: 1984 or 1985 (age 40–41); Muzaffarpur, Bihar, India
- Other name: Shreya Narayan
- Occupations: Actress, writer
- Years active: 2009–present

Shreya Narayan is an Indian film and television actress and a writer.

== Career ==
Shreya also wrote a 3 part article on the "An Economic Model of Bollywood" for the Indian Economist.

== Film ==
Year	Title	Role	Notes
2009	Eik Dastak		
2010	Knock Out		
2010	Kuch Kariye	Ankita Sharma	
2010	Raajneeti	Cameo as Journalist	
2011	Tanu Weds Manu	Guest appearance	
2011	Saheb Biwi Aur Gangster	Mahua	
2011	Rockstar	Jordan's sister-in-law	
2012	Prem Mayee	Payal	
2014	Samrat & Co.	Divya Singh	
2014	Super Nani	Astha	
2016	Laal Rang	Neelam	
2020	Yaara	Tanuja	Released on ZEE5
2022	Murder at Koh e Fiza	Kangana	Released on Shemaroo
