= Diary of a Woman =

2025 English-language Psychological Drama film

- Theatrical release poster
- Directed by: Simon Aeby
- Written by: Screenplay & Dialogue: Simon Aeby
- Produced by: Simon Aeby; Marcel Schneider; Remo Muggli
- Starring: Marcel Schneider; Olga Dinnikova; Florence Matousek; Jürg Plüss
- Cinematography: Roberto Cancellara
- Edited by: Roberto Cancellara
- Music by: Adriano Cancellara
- Production companies: Simon Aeby Films; Snider Films
- Distributed by: Manoj Nandwana
- Release date: 11 September 2025
- Running time: 90 minutes
- Language: English

Diary of a Woman is a 2025 psychological drama film directed by Simon Aeby.

== Production ==
The film is directed by Simon Aeby and produced by Simon Aeby, Marcel Schneider, and Remo Muggli.

== Cast ==
- Marcel Schneider as Alex Darkley
- Olga Dinnikova as Mother of Alex Darkley
- Florence Matousek as Laura
- Jürg Plüss as Man in Danceclub

== Synopsis ==
The story delves into Alex's transformation into Alexa, a journey that initially brings joy but soon leads to isolation and despair. The narrative reaches a poignant climax with a suicide attempt and concludes with Alex reconnecting with his girlfriend, leaving the audience with lingering questions about his future.

== Reception ==
The movie was reviewed by Firstpost, The Times of India, and ABP Live.
