= Bathtub hoax =

Fanciful story by H.L. Mencken

The bathtub hoax was a famous hoax perpetrated by the American journalist H. L. Mencken involving the publication of a fictitious history of the bathtub.

== Content of hoax ==
On December 28, 1917, an article titled "A Neglected Anniversary" by H. L. Mencken was published in the New York Evening Mail. Mencken claimed that the actual anniversary of the first American bathtub, the alleged 75th, had gone unnoticed the previous week. This was supposedly in spite of the fact that the Public Health Service of Washington, D.C., had prepared for celebrations several months prior, which were ultimately quashed by the intervening enactment of Prohibition in that city.

The article claimed that the bathtub had been invented by Lord John Russell of England in 1828, and that Cincinnatian Adam Thompson became acquainted with it during business trips there in the 1830s. Thompson allegedly went back to Cincinnati and took the first bath in the United States on December 20, 1842. The invention purportedly aroused great controversy in Cincinnati, with detractors claiming that its expensive nature was undemocratic and local doctors claiming it was dangerous. This debate was said to have spread across the nation, with an ordinance banning bathing between November and March supposedly narrowly failing in Philadelphia and a similar ordinance allegedly being effective in Boston between 1845 and 1862. After Brooklynite John F. Simpson was claimed to have invented the zinc tub in 1847, the price of bathtubs was said to have plummeted and much of the criticism against them was said to have abated. Around the same time, Oliver Wendell Holmes Sr. was claimed to have campaigned for the bathtub against remaining medical opposition in Boston; the American Medical Association supposedly granted sanction to the practice in 1850, followed by practitioners of homeopathy in 1853.

According to the article, then-Vice President Millard Fillmore visited the Thompson bathtub in March 1850 and having bathed in it became a proponent of bathtubs. Upon his accession to the presidency in July of that year, Fillmore was said to have ordered the construction of a bathtub in the White House, which allegedly refueled the controversy of providing the president with indulgences not enjoyed by George Washington or Thomas Jefferson. Nevertheless, the effect of the bathtub's installation was said to have obliterated any remaining opposition, such that it was said that every hotel in New York had a bathtub by 1860. Fillmore's bathtub was said to have remained in operation until the first administration of Grover Cleveland, when it was supposedly replaced by a bathtub that was still in operation at the time of the article's publication.

== Legacy ==
Mencken grew concerned of people taking his article seriously, comparing it in acceptance to the Norman Conquest.

In 1949 Mencken wrote:

The success of this idle hoax, done in time of war, when more serious writing was impossible, vastly astonished me. It was taken gravely by a great many other newspapers, and presently made its way into medical literature and into standard reference books. It had, of course, no truth in it whatsoever, and I more than once confessed publicly that it was only a jocosity ... Scarcely a month goes by that I do not find the substance of it reprinted, not as foolishness but as fact, and not only in newspapers but in official documents and other works of the highest pretensions.

Fillmore's birthplace of Moravia, New York, has annual "Fillmore Days" where people race in modified bathtubs. After a 20-year hiatus the Fillmore Days were revived in 2019.
