= The Lost Tape (film) =

- Directed by: Rakshit Dahiya
- Produced by: Ashok Baphna
- Starring: Ankuar Panchal; Esha Rajee; Nishantt Tanwar; Monali Sehgal; Shaurya Singh
- Cinematography: Dhaval Ganbote
- Edited by: Vivek Agrawal
- Production company: Baphna Films
- Distributed by: Dimension Pictures
- Release date: 14 September 2012
- Country: India
- Language: Hindi

The Lost Tape is a 2012 Indian Hindi-language found footage psychological horror film directed by Rakshit Dahiya and produced by Ashok Baphna. The film's cinematography is done by Dhaval Ganbote, a graduate from Whistling Woods International Institute and is edited by Vivek Agrawal, an editing Faculty of Whistling Woods International Institute. All Media Rights of the film are owned by Dimension Pictures.

== Plot ==
Five youngsters went into the woods of Chail, Himachal Pradesh to explore an old urban legend's story. They were completely unaware of the fact that they were slowly becoming part of the story. The more they found out, the closer they got to the unexplained reality, of what they thought was merely a myth. After entering into the woods, they were never seen again. The search went on for six months and the case was closed. Until one day, police recovered a digital video recorder, which held the unexplained secret. This film unfolds the mystery of those five youngsters' mysterious disappearance. A tale of Love, friendship, betrayal and fear. Fear of the devil and fear of the Lord himself.

== Cast ==
- Ankuar Panchal As Lavish
- Esha Rajee as Jassi
- Actor Nishant Tanwar as Rahul
- Monali Sehgal as Ayesha
- Shaurya Singh as Jai

=== Filming ===
The shoot took place in the forests of Chail, Himachal Pradesh.
