= The Lost Tapes (TV series) =

The Lost Tapes is an American documentary series that aired on the Smithsonian Channel.

The series aired ten episodes over two seasons, intermittently from 2016 to 2018. The first season featured four episodes; the second season featured six episodes.

== Synopsis ==
The documentary featured archival footages from various sources (local and national news media, home movies and recordings) which were used to offer new perspectives on important events of the 20th and 21st centuries. Only the voices of those from the archives were heard; there was no commentary outside of an occasional graphic.

== Episodes ==
=== Season 1 ===
No. overall	No. in season	Title	Directed by	Written by	Original release date
1	1	"Pearl Harbor attack"	TBA	TBA	TBA
2	2	"1992 Los Angeles riots"	TBA	TBA	TBA
3	3	"Patty Hearst"	TBA	TBA	TBA
4	4	"Son of Sam"	TBA	TBA	TBA

=== Season 2 ===
No. overall	No. in season	Title	Directed by	Written by	Original release date
5	1	"Assassination of Malcolm X"	TBA	TBA	TBA
6	2	"Impeachment of Bill Clinton"	TBA	TBA	TBA
7	3	"Tet Offensive"	TBA	TBA	TBA
8	4	"Apollo 13"	TBA	TBA	TBA
9	5	"D.C. sniper attacks"	TBA	TBA	TBA
10	6	"1974 Super Outbreak"	TBA	TBA	TBA

== See also ==
- June 17th, 1994
- LA 92
- The Atomic Cafe
