= Great Wall of China hoax =

1899 faked newspaper story

Lima News 1899

The Great Wall of China hoax was a faked newspaper story concocted on June 25, 1899, by four reporters in Denver, Colorado about bids by American businesses on a contract to demolish the Great Wall of China and construct a road in its place. The story was reprinted by a number of newspapers.

In 1939, an urban legend began when Denver songwriter Harry Lee Wilber claimed in a magazine article that the 1899 hoax had ignited the Boxer Rebellion of 1900. The radio commentators Paul Harvey and Dwight Sands perpetuated the legend.

However, there is no known connection. The seeds of the rebellion had been planted over a year before the news story came out, and there is no known evidence that the "Boxers" was ever aware of the article’s existence. Boxer activity intensified in response to the German invasion in Shandong during March 1899—before the hoax was invented. No Chinese history reference relates the hoax to the Boxer Rebellion.

The cultural historian Carlos Rojas comments that the original hoax being perpetuated by a second hoax, a "metahoax," illustrates the ability of the Great Wall to "mean radically different things in different contexts."

== Background ==
The hoax was created during the late 19th century, at the height of Western imperialism in Asia. In 1898, Britain obtained a 99-year lease for the New Territories from China, extending the colony of Hong Kong that had been acquired in 1841, along with compelling the Chinese government to lease Weihaiwei through a diplomatic ultimatum. Other Western states were also involved in acquiring territories in China, with Germany seizing the Chinese port of Qingdao for use as a military base and France leasing Guangzhouwan. Alongside the Japanese victory in the First Sino-Japanese War, these territorial acquisitions led to a massive uptick in xenophobia among the Chinese.

== Beginning ==
The hoax began with four Denver newspaper reporters, Al Stevens, Jack Tournay, John Lewis, and Hal Wilshire, who represented the four Denver newspapers—the Post, the Republican, the Times, and the Rocky Mountain News. The four met by chance at Denver Union Station where each were waiting in hopes of spotting someone of prominence who could become a subject for a news story. Seeing no celebrities and frustrated with no story in sight and deadlines due, Stevens remarked, "I don't know what you guys are going to do, but I'm going to fake it. It won't hurt anybody, so what the Devil." The other three men agreed to concoct a story and walked on 17th Street toward the Oxford Hotel to discuss possible ideas.

Some stories, such as New York detectives tracking kidnappers of a rich heiress or the creation of a powerful company that would compete with the equally powerful Colorado Fuel and Iron Company were ruled out, as stories set in the United States were more likely to be checked and verified. The reporters then began running through countries such as Germany, Russia, and Japan until one of the reporters suggested China. John Lewis grew excited and exclaimed, "That's it, the Great Wall of China! Must be 50 years since that old pile's been in the news. Let's build our story around it. Let's do the Chinese a real favor. Let's tear the old pile down!"

The four reporters concocted a story in which the Chinese planned to demolish the Great Wall, constructing a road in its place, and were taking bids from American companies for the project. Chicago engineer Frank C. Lewis was bidding for the job. The story described a group of engineers in a Denver stopover on their way to China.

Although one of the reporters worried about the consequences of such an invented story, he was eventually overruled by the other reporters. Leaving the Oxford Bar, they went to the Windsor Hotel, signed four fictitious names to the register and told the desk clerk to say to anyone who asked that reporters had interviewed four men before they left for California.

The reporters swore they would stick to this story as fact as long as any of the others were still alive. The next day, all four major Denver newspapers, the Times, Post, Republican, and Rocky Mountain News featured the fabricated tale on their front pages. In the Times, as well as the other three papers, this was a typical headline:

Great Chinese Wall Doomed! Peking Seeks World Trade!

Although the Denver papers dropped the story after a few days, the story did not die. Two weeks after the Denver headlines, John Lewis noticed that a large Eastern U.S. newspaper had picked up the story and included information not even in the original story. This newspaper included quotes from a Chinese mandarin confirming the story, with illustrations and comments about the tearing down of the wall. Eventually the story spread to newspapers all across the country and then into Europe. Although the story developed into different versions, the essence remained: Americans were going to China to tear down the Great Wall.

Ten years later, the last surviving reporter of the hoax, Hal Wilshire, confessed the secret.

== Harry Lee Wilber ==
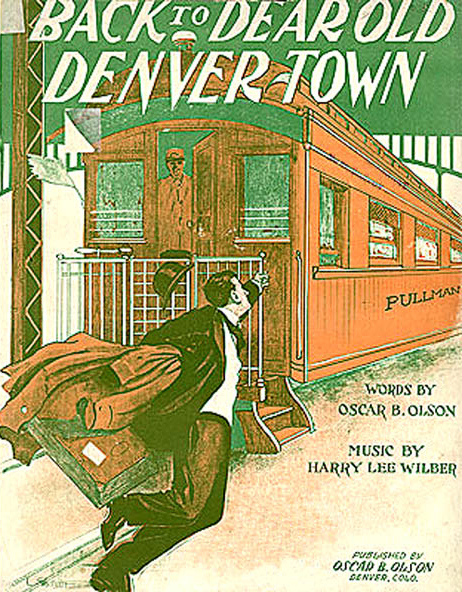
The 1899 hoax which began at the Denver train station was expanded in 1939 by Denver songwriter Harry Lee Wilber.

The alleged Boxer Rebellion connection originated many years later with Denver songwriter Harry Lee Wilber (1875–1946). Wilber embellished the original tale when he wrote an article "A Fake That Rocked the World," for the North American Review in 1939. Wilber's article claimed that when the "pure canard" reached China, the newspapers there published it with "shouting headlines" and the Boxers, "already incensed, believed the yarn" and "all hell broke loose."

Wilber's article was reprinted 17 years later in Great Hoaxes of All Time (1956), edited by Robert Medill McBride and Neil Pritchie. Wilber, who composed the music for "Back to Dear Old Denver Town" (1912), was the first manager of the Fox Fullerton Theater (Fullerton, California) after it was constructed in 1924–25. The legend was also told in More of Paul Harvey's The Rest of the Story (1981).

== Legacy ==
In 2012, the Denver Theater Center presented "The Great Wall Story," a play by Lloyd Suh, based on the incident.
