= Nagaoka Castle =

Japanese castle located in Nagaoka, Niigata Prefecture, Japan

Nagaoka Castle 長岡城
- Nagaoka, Niigata Prefecture, Japan
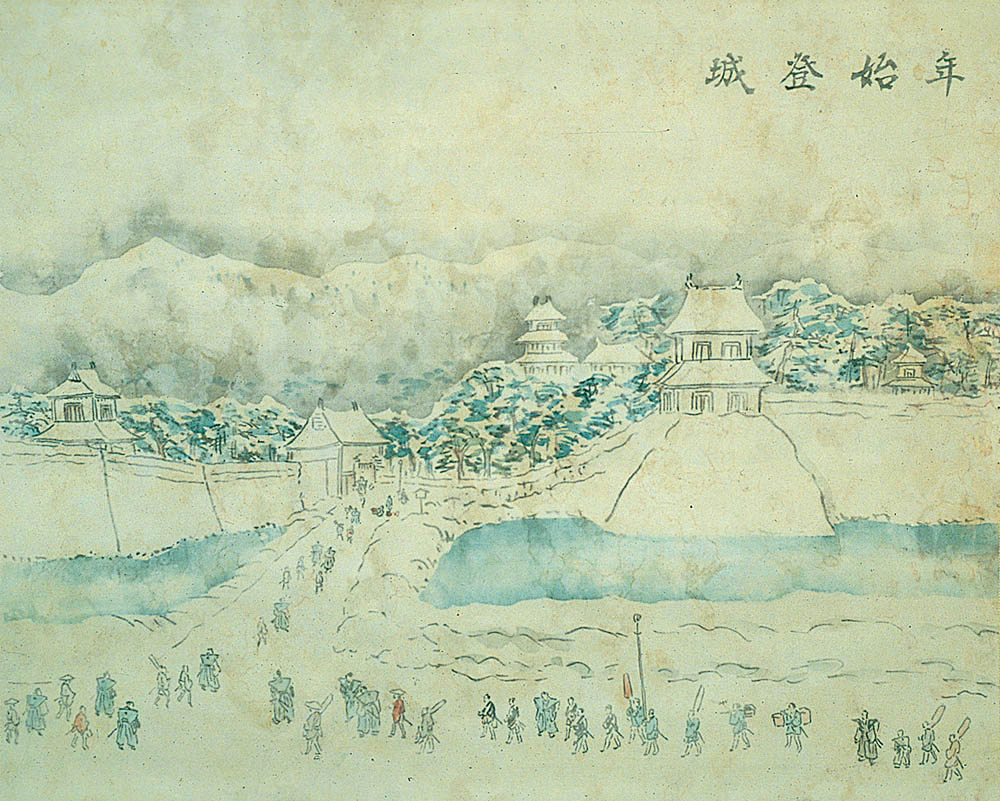
- Edo period sketch of Nagaoka Castle

Site information
- Type: flatland-style Japanese castle
- Condition: ruin

Location
- Coordinates: 37°26′51″N 138°51′11″E

Site history
- Built: 1537
- Built by: Hori clan, Makino clan
- In use: Edo period
- Demolished: 1868

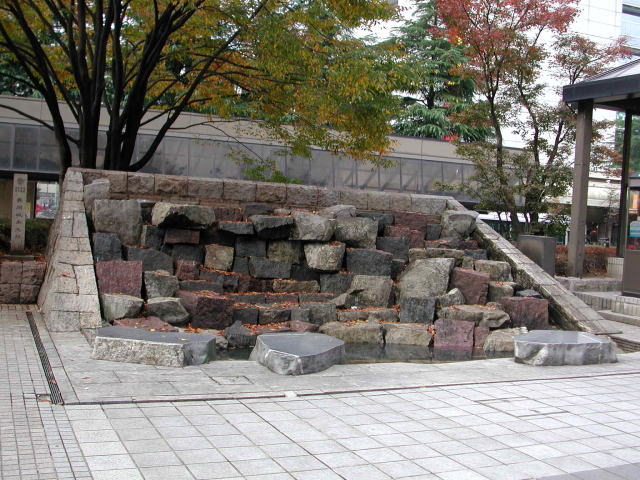
Nagaoka Castle Hon-maru ruins

Nagaoka Castle (長岡城, Nagaoka-jō) was a Japanese castle located in Nagaoka, Niigata Prefecture, Japan. At the end of the Edo period, Nagaoka Castle was home to a branch of the Makino clan, daimyō of Nagaoka Domain.

== History ==
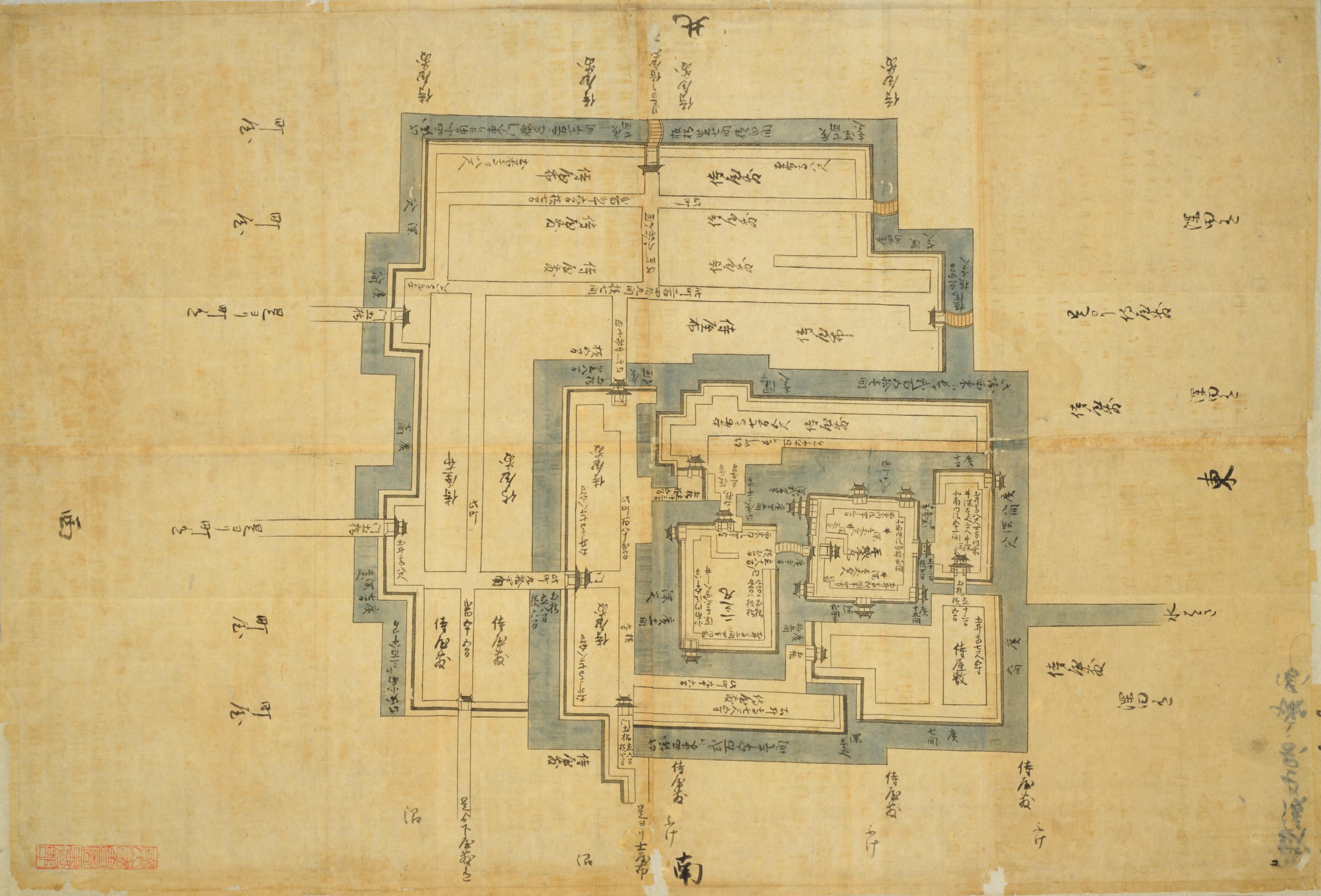
Plan of Nagaoka Castle drawn in the Edo period

The area around Nagaoka Castle was the territory of the Hori clan under Hori Naoyori (1577-1639), who was elevated to the status of a 60,000 koku daimyō for his services to Toyotomi Hideyoshi. Under the Tokugawa shogunate, Hori Naoyori was awarded an additional 20,000 koku from the holdings of the disgraced Matsudaira Tadateru in 1616. Around this time, he relocated his seat from Zaōdo (蔵王堂) on the east bank of the Shinano River to higher ground on the west bank. This marked the start of Nagaoka Castle. He was transferred to Murakami Domain in 1618, and the castle was completed by Makino Tadanari (1581-1655), whose descendants continued to hold the castle until the Meiji restoration.

Most of the castle burned down in March 1728 and was only restored in 1754. Another fire in 1844 destroyed two gates and a portion of the daimyo’s palace. The castle also suffered repeatedly from flooding due to its location, notably in 1671, 1674, 1781, and 1789. The Sanjō earthquake of 1829 also destroyed most of the castle structures.

During the Boshin War, representatives of the domain met with representatives of the Satchō Alliance at a nearby temple, but the negotiations ended without agreement, and Nagaoka Castle was attacked and destroyed by the military forces of the new Meiji government.

Following the war the moats were filled in, and part of the castle site was sold to private hands. In 1898, Nagaoka Station was built on the eastern half of the Honmaru central bailey. Nagaoka City Hall and other public structures occupy much of the remaining site.

== Description ==
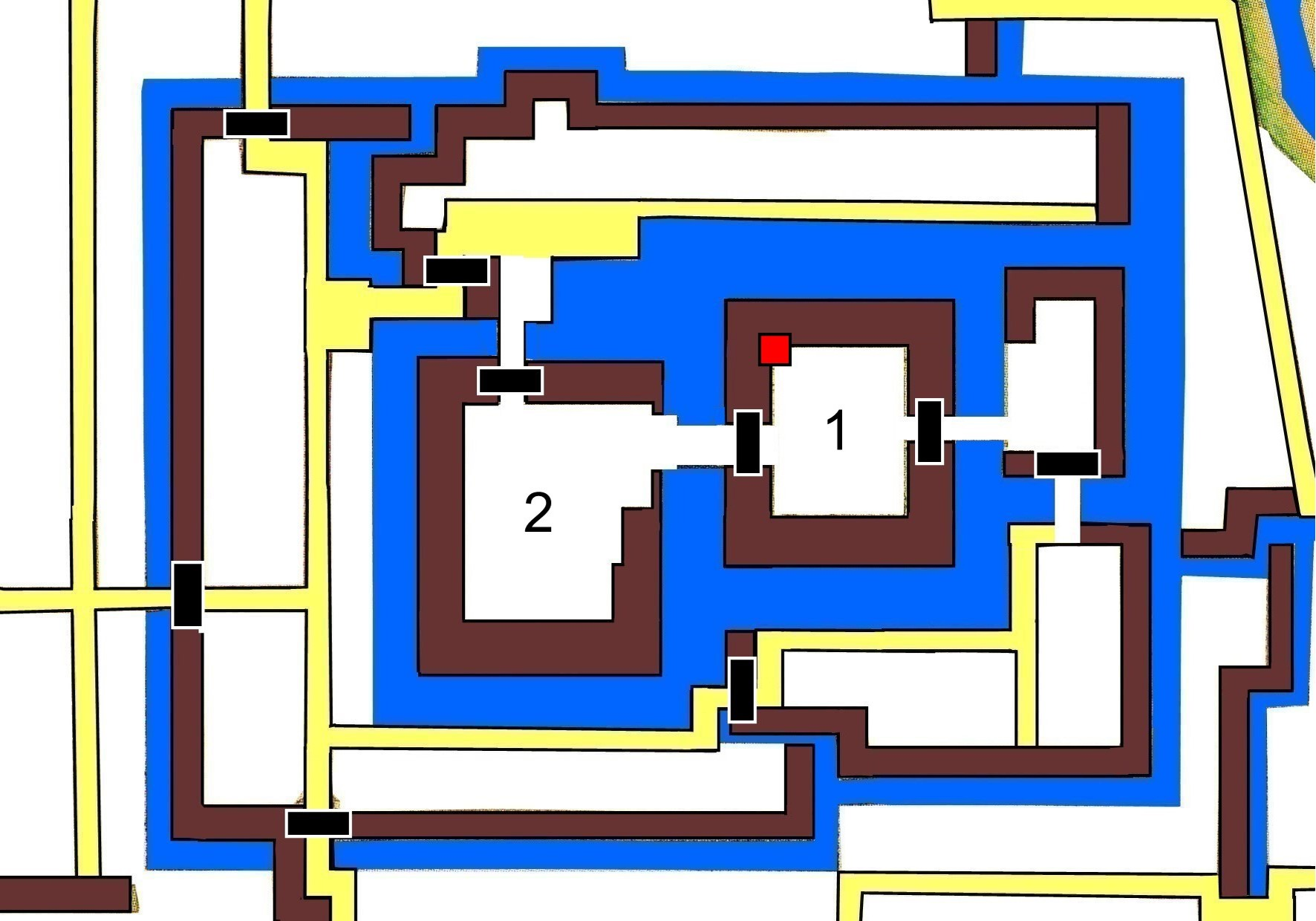
Plan of Nagaoka Castle with Honmaru (1) and Ni-no-Maru (2)

Nagaoka Castle was a flatland-style castle with two central baileys, the Honmaru (本丸) and the Ni-no-Maru (二の丸), both surrounded by a moat. These were in turn surrounded by the San-no-Maru (三の丸) and Tsume-no-Maru (詰の丸 ) Baileys, and the Minami-Kuruwa (南曲輪 ) and Nishi-Kuruwa (西曲輪) forecourts. This outer ring of defences was also surrounded by a moat. The castle had only earthen ramparts, with yagura watchtowers at various locations, and there was no donjon in the central bailey.

== Literature ==
- Schmorleitz, Morton S. (1974). Castles in Japan. Tokyo: Charles E. Tuttle Co. pp. 144–145. ISBN 0-8048-1102-4.
- Motoo, Hinago (1986). Japanese Castles. Tokyo: Kodansha. p. 200 pages. ISBN 0-87011-766-1.
- Mitchelhill, Jennifer (2004). Castles of the Samurai: Power and Beauty. Tokyo: Kodansha. p. 112 pages. ISBN 4-7700-2954-3.
- Turnbull, Stephen (2003). Japanese Castles 1540-1640. Osprey Publishing. p. 64 pages. ISBN 1-84176-429-9.
- Owada, Yasutsune: Nagaoka-jo in: Miura, Masayuki (eds): Shiro to Jinya. Tokoku-hen. Gakken, 2006. ISBN 978-4-05-604378-5
