= Tadakatsu =

- Gender: Male

Origin
- Origin: Japanese
- Meaning: Different meanings depending on the kanji used

Tadakatsu (written 忠勝 or 忠毅) is a Japanese masculine given name. Notable people with the name include:

- Honda Tadakatsu (本多 忠勝; 1548–1610), Japanese samurai and daimyō
- Makino Tadakatsu (牧野 忠毅; 1859–1918), Japanese daimyō
- Mukai Shōgen Tadakatsu (向井 忠勝; 1582–1641), Japanese samurai
- Sakai Tadakatsu (Shōnai) (酒井 忠勝; 1594–1647), Japanese daimyō
- Sakai Tadakatsu (酒井 忠勝; 1587–1662), Japanese official and daimyō
- Utsumi Tadakatsu (内海 忠勝; 1843–1905), Japanese samurai and politician
