= Makino Tadayuki =

Makino Tadayuki 牧野 忠恭
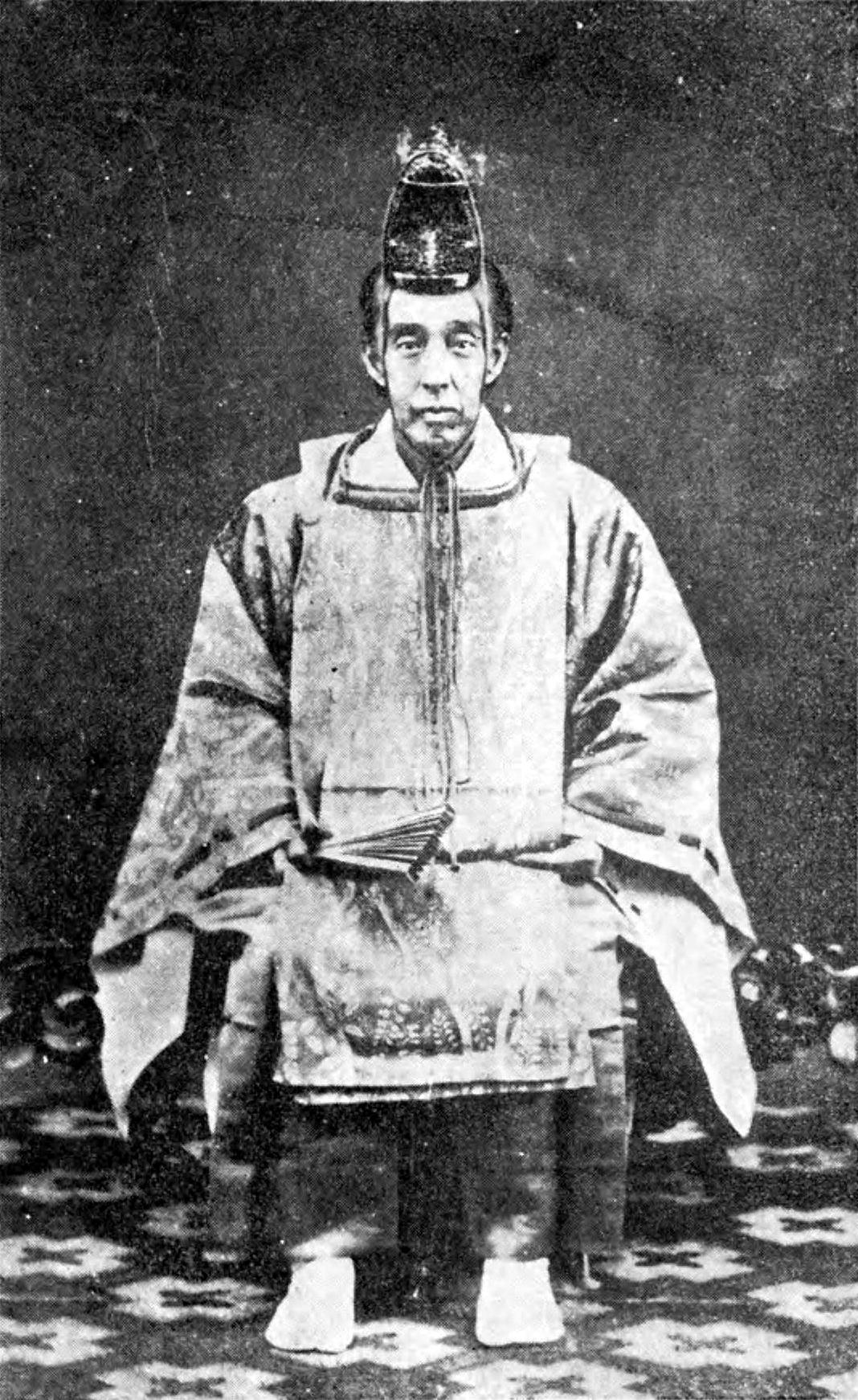
- Makino Tadayuki

11th Daimyō of Nagaoka
- In office 1858–1867
- Preceded by: Makino Tadamasa
- Succeeded by: Makino Tadakuni

54th Kyoto Shoshidai
- In office 1862–1863
- Preceded by: Matsudaira Munehide
- Succeeded by: Inaba Masakuni

Rōjū
- In office 1863–1865

Personal details
- Born: October 22, 1824 Edo, Japan
- Died: September 1, 1878 (aged 53)

Makino Tadayuki (牧野 忠恭; October 22, 1824 – September 1, 1878) was a Japanese daimyō of the late Edo period.

The Makino were identified as one of the fudai or insider daimyō clans which were hereditary vassals or allies of the Tokugawa clan, in contrast with the tozama or outsider clans.

== Makino clan genealogy ==
The fudai Makino clan originated in 16th century Mikawa Province. Their elevation in status by Toyotomi Hideyoshi dates from 1588. They claim descent from Takechouchi no Sukune, who was a legendary statesman and lover of the legendary Empress Jingū.

Tadayuki was part of the senior branch of the Makino which was established at Tako Domain in Kōzuke Province in 1590; and in 1616, their holdings were moved to Nagamine Domain in Echigo Province. From 1618 through 1868, this branch of the Makino remained at Nagaoka Domain (74,000 koku) in Echigo Province.

Tadayuki was the 11th-generation head of this senior line of the Makino.

The head of this clan line was ennobled as a "Viscount" in the Meiji period.

== Tokugawa official ==
Tadayuki served in the Tokugawa shogunate as a rōjū. He was the shogunates's fifty-fifth Kyoto shoshidai in the period spanning September 17, 1862, through July 26, 1863.

During the Boshin War of 1868–1869, the forces from Nagaoka Han fought against Meiji government forces. In this period, Tsuginosuke Kawai (1827–1868), was the military general of the Makino Clan; and today the Tsuginosuke Kawai Memorial Hall is sited in Naga-chô where Kawai's residence once stood. When Meiji forces took Nagaoka, Kawai withdrew towards Aizu and Sendai along with Makino Tadayuki and other fleeing clan leaders.

Tadayuki died in Tokyo in 1878, and is buried at Saikai-ji Temple.

== Notes ==
Preceded by Makino Tadamasa	11th Daimyō of Nagaoka; 1858–1867	Succeeded by Makino Tadakuni
Preceded by Matsudaira Munehide	54th Kyoto Shoshidai; 1862–1863	Succeeded by Inaba Masakuni
