= Isoroku Yamamoto =

Japanese admiral (1884–1943)

- 山本 五十六
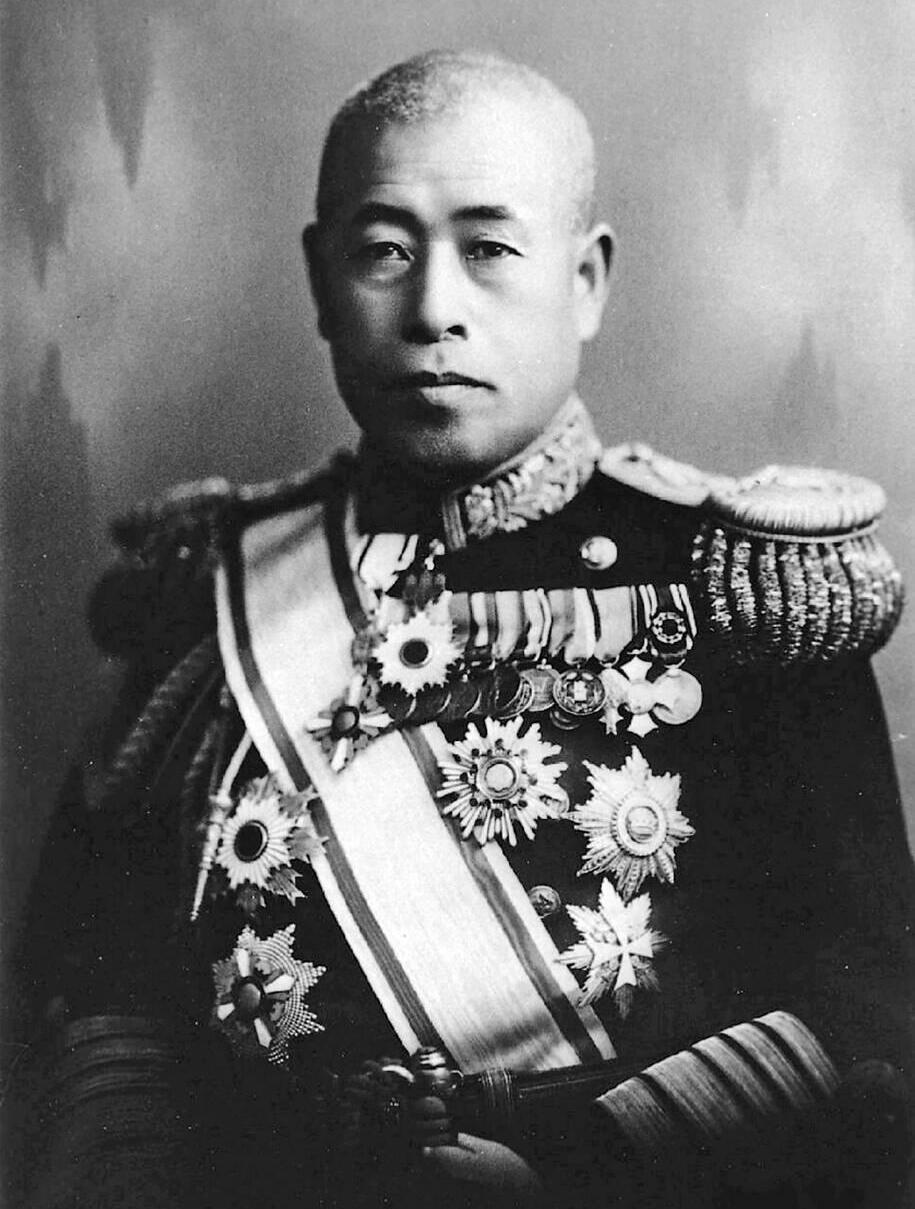
- Yamamoto, c. 1940

Commander-in-Chief of the Combined Fleet
- In office 30 August 1939 – 18 April 1943
- Monarch: Hirohito
- Preceded by: Zengo Yoshida
- Succeeded by: Mineichi Koga

Personal details
- Born: April 4, 1884 Nagaoka, Niigata, Japan
- Died: April 18, 1943 (aged 59) near Panguna, Bougainville, Territory of New Guinea
- Resting place: Tama Cemetery, Tokyo
- Spouse: Reiko Mihashi (m. 1918)
- Children: Two sons and two daughters
- Education: Imperial Japanese Naval Academy; Harvard University

Military service
- Allegiance: Empire of Japan
- Branch/service: Imperial Japanese Navy
- Years of service: 1904–1943
- Rank: Gensui (posthumous)
- Commands: Isuzu, Akagi, 1st Carrier Division, Naval Aviation Bureau, 1st Fleet, Combined Fleet, 1st Battleship Division
- Battles/wars: Russo-Japanese War; Battle of Tsushima (WIA); World War II; Pacific War; Attack on Pearl Harbor; Operation MI; New Guinea campaign; Operation I-Go; Solomon Islands campaign; Guadalcanal campaign; Operation Ke; Operation I-Go; Operation Vengeance †
- Awards: Grand Cordon of the Supreme Order of the Chrysanthemum (posthumous); Knight's Cross of the Iron Cross with Oak Leaves and Swords

Isoroku Yamamoto (山本 五十六, Yamamoto Isoroku; April 4, 1884 – April 18, 1943) was an admiral of the Imperial Japanese Navy (IJN) and the commander of the Combined Fleet during World War II. He commanded the fleet from 1939 until his death in 1943, overseeing the start of the Pacific War in 1941 and Japan's early successes and defeats, before his plane was shot down by U.S. fighter aircraft over New Guinea.

Yamamoto graduated from the Imperial Naval Academy in 1904 and served in the Russo-Japanese War, where he lost two fingers at the Battle of Tsushima. He later studied at Harvard University in the United States and was appointed naval attaché to the Japanese embassy in Washington. His experiences convinced him that naval power depended on access to oil and industrial capacity, and that Japan thus had little hope to defeat the U.S. in a war. He was one of the first naval leaders to conclude that naval aviation and aircraft carriers would play a decisive role in any future conflict.

In 1936, Yamamoto was appointed navy vice minister, and opposed Japan's alliance with Germany and Italy in the Tripartite Pact of 1940. In 1939, he was appointed commander-in-chief of the Combined Fleet, and was tasked with creating a strategy for war with the United States: he conceived the initial surprise attack on Pearl Harbor in December 1941.

In the early months of the war, the Japanese fleet scored a series of substantial naval victories. These gains were halted at the Battle of Midway in June 1942, in which four Japanese carriers were sunk. Yamamoto committed to the defense of the Solomon Islands in the Guadalcanal campaign, but was unable to prevent their capture. In April 1943, Yamamoto was killed after American code breakers intercepted his flight plans, enabling the United States Army Air Forces to shoot down his aircraft.

== Family background ==
Yamamoto was born as Isoroku Takano (高野 五十六, Takano Isoroku) in Nagaoka, Niigata. His father, Sadayoshi Takano (高野 貞吉), had been an intermediate-rank samurai of the Nagaoka Domain. "Isoroku" is a Japanese term meaning "56"; the name referred to his father's age at Isoroku's birth. Isoroku was the 6th son and 7th child of Sadayoshi. His mother was Sadayoshi's third wife. The three wives were sisters; the first two died young. It was common at the time for a widower to marry the younger sister of a wife who died.

In 1916, Isoroku was adopted into the Yamamoto family (another family of former Nagaoka samurai) and took the Yamamoto name. It was a common practice for samurai families lacking sons to adopt suitable young men in this fashion to carry on the family name, the rank and the income that went with it. Isoroku married Reiko Mihashi in 1918; they had two sons and two daughters.

== Early career ==
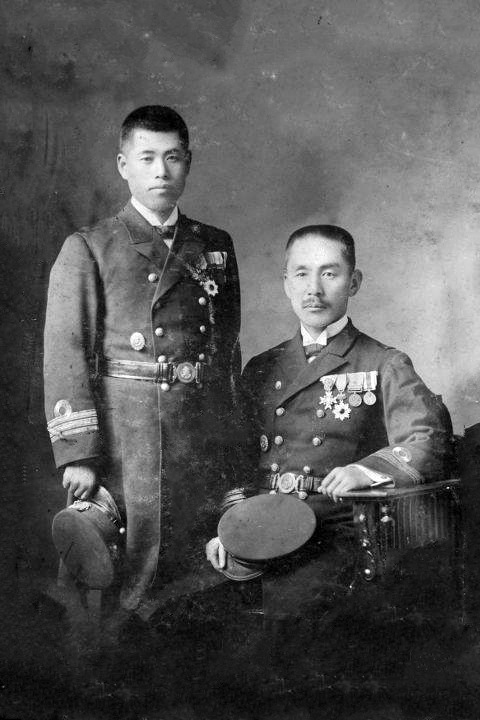
Yamamoto (left) with his lifelong friend Teikichi Hori as young officers of the Japanese Navy, 1915–1919

Yamamoto graduated from the Imperial Japanese Naval Academy in 1904, ranking 11th in his class. He then subsequently served as a signalman on the armored cruiser Nisshin during the Russo-Japanese War. He was wounded at the Battle of Tsushima, suffering a wound "the size of a baby's head" on his thigh and losing his index and middle fingers on his left hand, in an explosion in the ship's forward turret. It appeared the explosion was not the result of Russian fire but of the gun itself exploding. He returned to the Naval Staff College in 1914, emerging as a lieutenant commander in 1916. In December 1919, he was promoted to commander.

== 1920s and 1930s ==
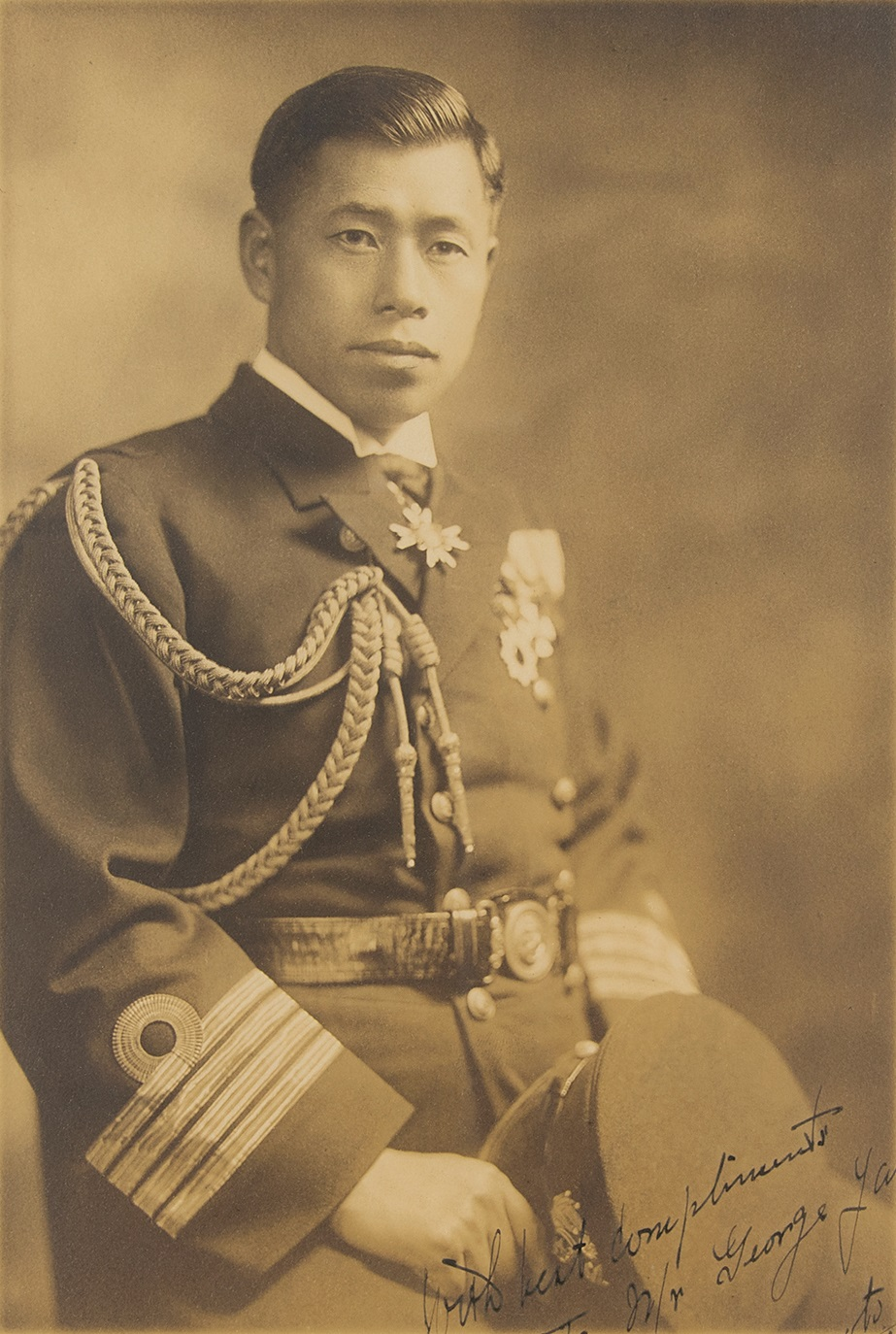
Captain Isoroku Yamamoto, 30 Jan 1928

Yamamoto was part of the Japanese Navy establishment, who were rivals of the more aggressive Army establishment, especially the officers of the Kwantung Army. He promoted a policy of a strong fleet to project force through gunboat diplomacy, rather than a fleet used primarily for the transport of invasion land forces, as some of his political opponents in the Army wanted. This stance led him to oppose the invasion of China. He also opposed war against the United States, partly because of his studies at Harvard University (1919–1921) and his two postings as a naval attaché (1919-1921, concurrent with studying at Harvard; and 1926-1928) in Washington, D.C., where he learned to speak fluent English. Yamamoto traveled extensively in the United States during his tour of duty there, where he studied American customs and business practices.

He was promoted to captain in 1923. On February 13, 1924, Captain Yamamoto was part of the Japanese delegation visiting the United States Naval War College. Later that year, he changed his specialty from gunnery to naval aviation. His first command was the cruiser Isuzu in 1928, followed by the aircraft carrier Akagi.

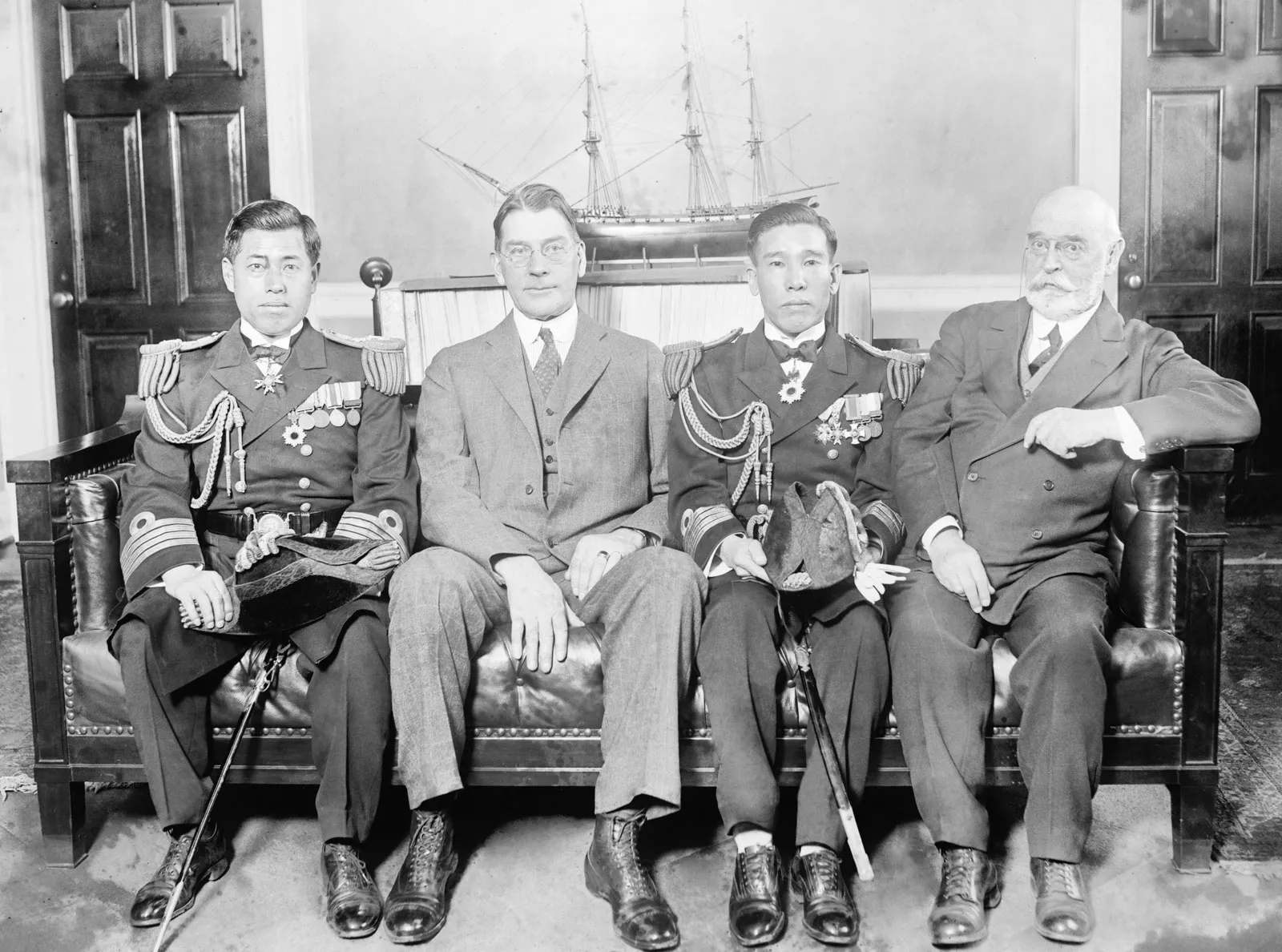
Yamamoto as a naval attaché to the United States, with the Secretary of the Navy Curtis D. Wilbur, Captain Kiyoshi Hasegawa, and Admiral Edward Walter Eberle, 1926

He participated in the London Naval Conference 1930 as a rear admiral and the London Naval Conference 1935 as a vice admiral, as the growing military influence on the government at the time deemed that a career military specialist needed to accompany the diplomats to the arms limitations talks. Yamamoto was a strong proponent of naval aviation and served as head of the Aeronautics Department, before accepting a post as commander of the First Carrier Division. Yamamoto opposed the Japanese invasion of northeast China in 1931, the subsequent full-scale land war with China in 1937, and the Tripartite Pact with Nazi Germany and Fascist Italy in 1940. As Deputy Navy Minister, he apologized to United States Ambassador Joseph C. Grew for the bombing of the gunboat USS Panay in December 1937. These issues made him a target of assassination threats by pro-war militarists.

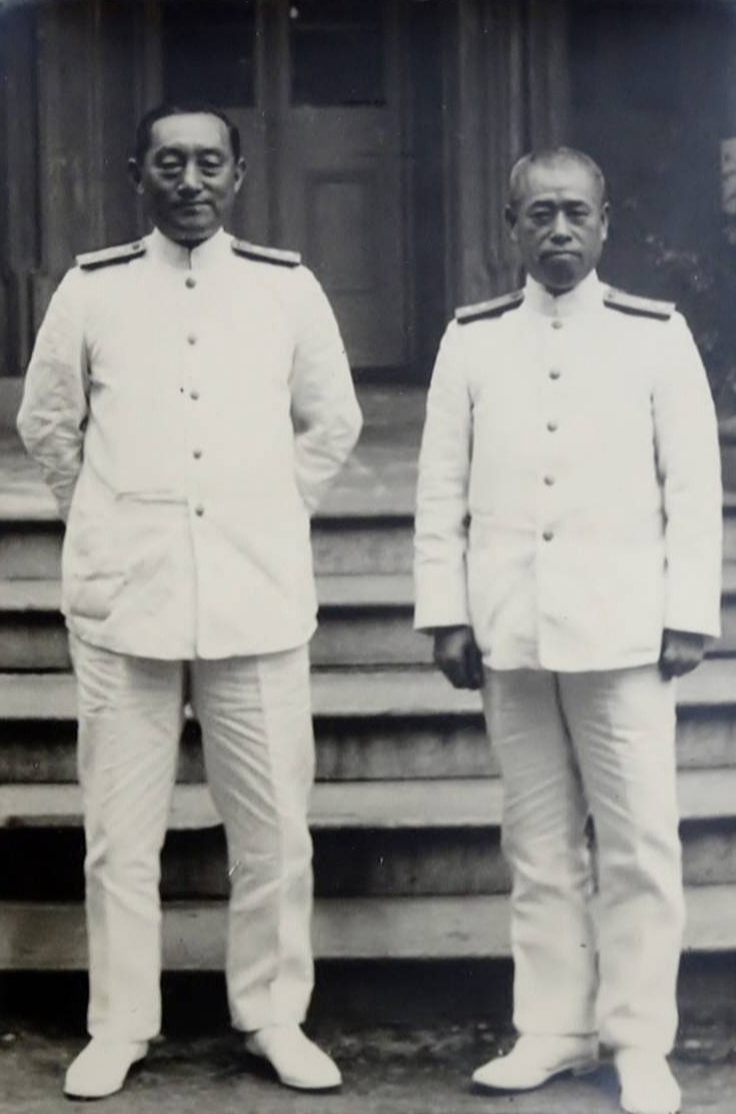
Mitsumasa Yonai and Yamamoto as Minister and Deputy Minister of the Navy, 1930s

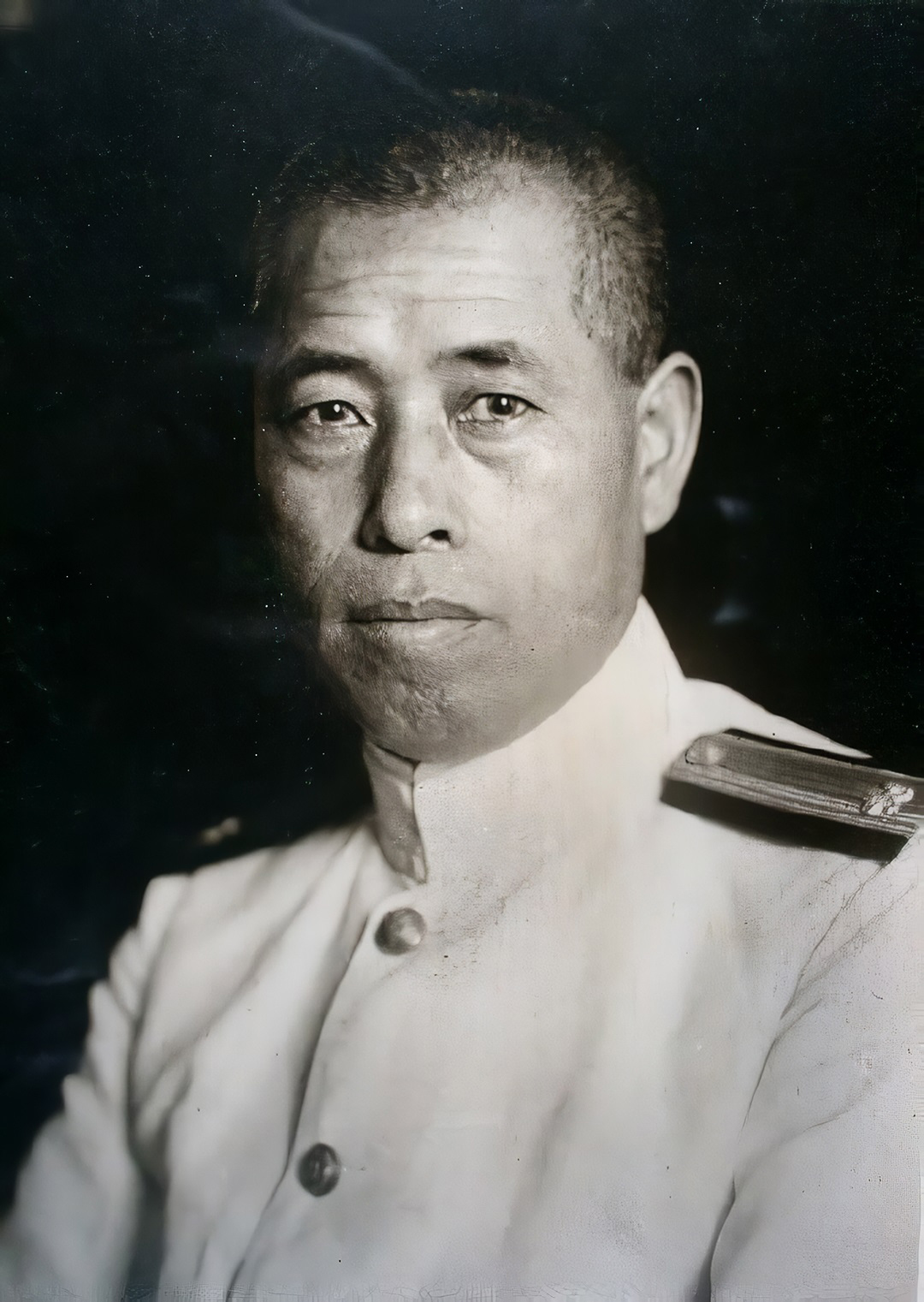
Isoroku Yamamoto as Vice-Minister of the Navy, August 1939

Throughout 1938, many young army and naval officers began to speak publicly against Yamamoto and certain other Japanese admirals, such as Mitsumasa Yonai and Shigeyoshi Inoue, for their strong opposition to a tripartite pact with Nazi Germany and Fascist Italy, which the admirals saw as inimical to "Japan's natural interests". Yamamoto received a steady stream of hate mail and death threats from Japanese nationalists. His reaction to the prospect of death by assassination was passive and accepting. The admiral wrote:

To die for Emperor and Nation is the highest hope of a military man. After a brave hard fight the blossoms are scattered on the fighting field. But if a person wants to take a life instead, still the fighting man will go to eternity for Emperor and country. One man's life or death is a matter of no importance. All that matters is the Empire. As Confucius said, "They may crush cinnabar, yet they do not take away its color; one may burn a fragrant herb, yet it will not destroy the scent." They may destroy my body, yet they will not take away my will.

The Japanese Army, annoyed at Yamamoto's unflinching opposition to a Rome-Berlin-Tokyo treaty, dispatched military police to "guard" him, a ruse by the Army to keep an eye on him. He was later reassigned from the naval ministry to sea as the commander-in-chief of the Combined Fleet on August 30, 1939. This was done as one of the last acts of acting Navy Minister Mitsumasa Yonai, under Baron Hiranuma Kiichirō's short-lived administration. It was done partly to make it harder for assassins to target Yamamoto. Yonai was certain that if Yamamoto remained ashore, he would be killed before the year [1939] ended.

== 1940–1941 ==
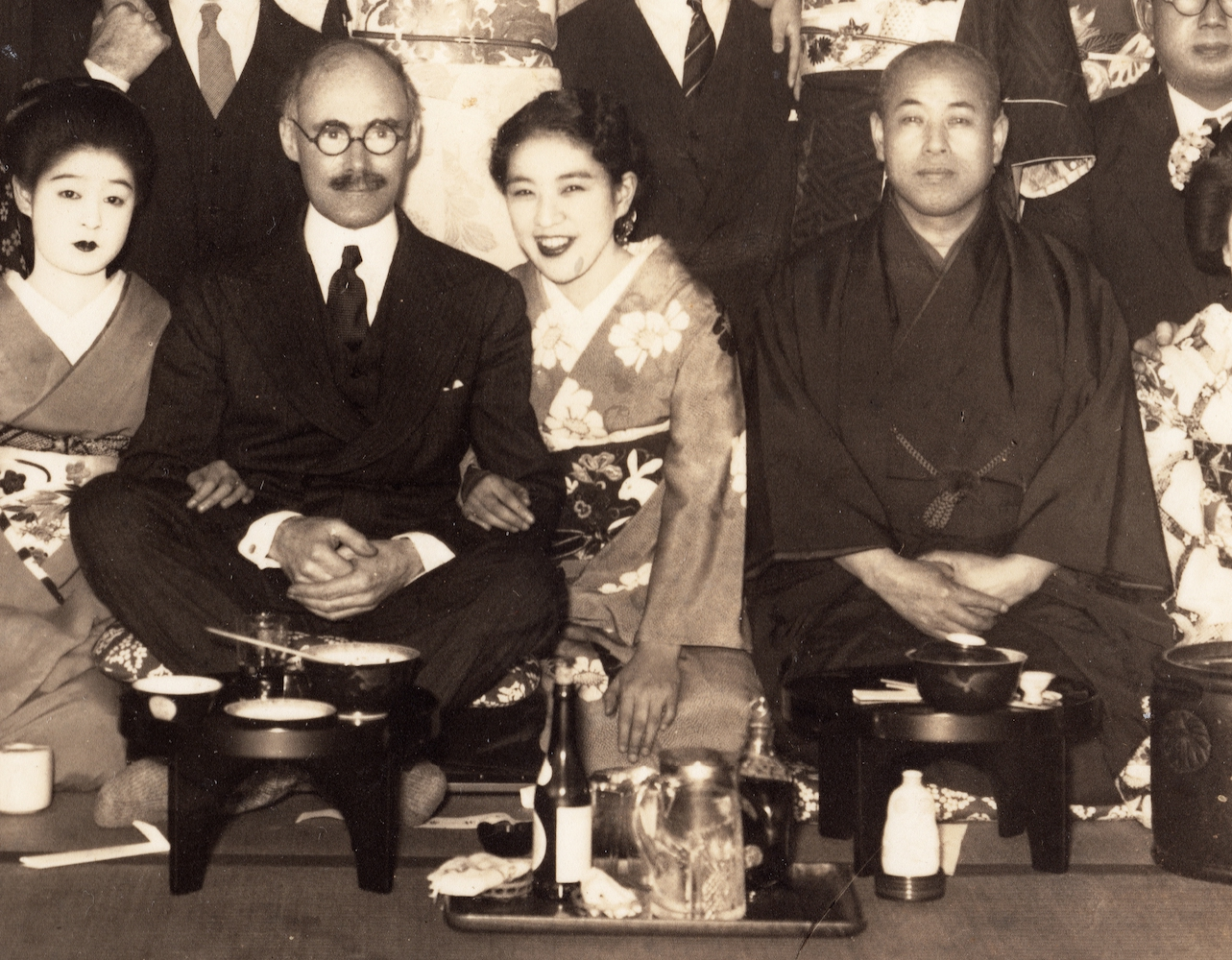
British Ambassador Robert Craigie and Yamamoto at a party hosted by Yamamoto, 1939

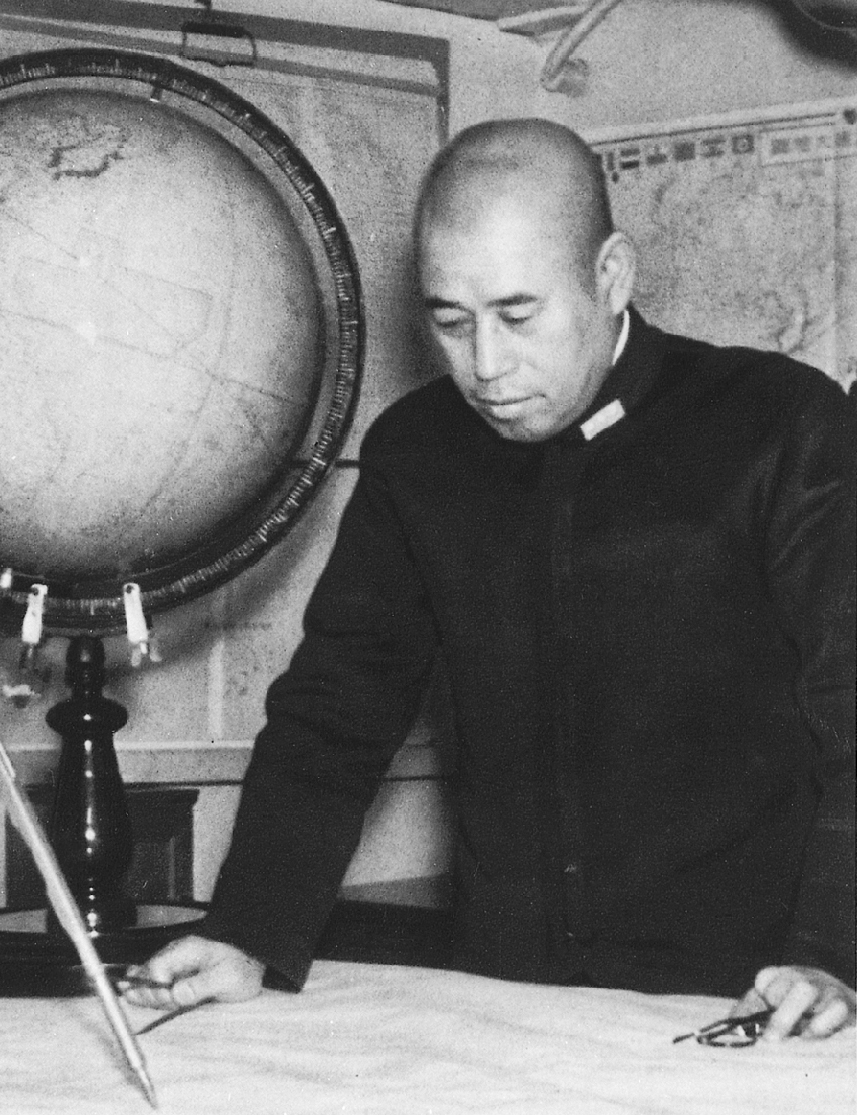
Yamamoto on board the battleship Nagato in 1940

Yamamoto was promoted to admiral on November 15, 1940. That was in spite of the fact that when Hideki Tojo was appointed prime minister on October 18, 1941, many political observers thought that Yamamoto's career was essentially over. Tojo had been Yamamoto's opponent from the time when the latter served as Japan's deputy naval minister and Tojo was the prime mover behind Japan's takeover of Manchuria.

It was believed that Yamamoto would be appointed to command the Yokosuka Naval Base, "a nice safe demotion with a big house and no power at all". However, after a brief stint in the post, a new Japanese cabinet was announced, and Yamamoto found himself returned to his position of power despite his open conflict with Tojo and other members of the Army's oligarchy, who favored war with the European powers and the United States.

Two of the main reasons for Yamamoto's political survival were his immense popularity within the fleet, where he commanded the respect of his men and officers, and his close relations with the imperial family. He also had the acceptance of Japan's naval hierarchy:

There was no officer more competent to lead the Combined Fleet to victory than Admiral Yamamoto. His daring plan for the Pearl Harbor attack had passed through the crucible of the Japanese naval establishment, and after many expressed misgivings, his fellow admirals had realized that Yamamoto spoke no more than the truth when he said that Japan's hope for victory in this [upcoming] war was limited by time and oil. Every sensible officer of the navy was well aware of the perennial oil problems. Also, it had to be recognized that if the enemy could seriously disturb Japanese merchant shipping, then the fleet would be endangered even more.

Consequently, Yamamoto stayed in his post. With Tojo now in charge of Japan's highest political office, it became clear the Army would lead the Navy into a war about which Yamamoto had serious reservations. He wrote to an ultranationalist:

Should hostilities once break out between Japan and the United States, it would not be enough that we take Guam and the Philippines, nor even Hawaii and San Francisco. To make victory certain, we would have to march into Washington and dictate the terms of peace in the White House. I wonder if our politicians [who speak so lightly of a Japanese-American war] have confidence as to the final outcome and are prepared to make the necessary sacrifices.

This quote was spread by the militarists, minus the last sentence, so it was interpreted in America as a boast that Japan would conquer the entire continental United States. The omitted sentence showed Yamamoto's counsel of caution about a war that could cost Japan dearly. Nevertheless, Yamamoto accepted the reality of impending war and planned for a quick victory by destroying the United States Pacific Fleet at Pearl Harbor in a preventive strike, while simultaneously thrusting into the oil- and rubber-rich areas of Southeast Asia, especially the Dutch East Indies, Borneo, and Malaya. In naval matters, Yamamoto opposed the building of the battleships Yamato and Musashi as an unwise investment of resources.

Yamamoto was responsible for a number of innovations in Japanese naval aviation. Although remembered for his association with aircraft carriers, Yamamoto did more to influence the development of land-based naval aviation, particularly the Mitsubishi G3M and G4M medium bombers. His demand for great range and the ability to carry a torpedo was intended to conform to Japanese conceptions of bleeding the American fleet as it advanced across the Pacific. The planes did achieve considerable range, but long-range fighter escorts were not available. The planes were lightly constructed and, when fully fueled, were vulnerable to enemy fire. That earned the G4M the sardonic nickname the "flying cigarette lighter". Yamamoto eventually died in one of those aircraft.

The range of the G3M and G4M contributed to a demand for great range in a fighter aircraft. That partly drove the requirements for the A6M Zero, which was as noteworthy for its range as for its maneuverability. Again, both attributes were achieved only with light construction and flammability, that later contributed to the A6M's high casualty rates as the war progressed.

As Japan moved toward a wider war during 1940, Yamamoto began to consider strategic as well as tactical innovation, again with mixed results. Prompted by talented young officers such as Lieutenant Commander Minoru Genda, Yamamoto approved the reorganization of Japanese carrier forces into the First Air Fleet, a consolidated striking force that gathered Japan's six largest carriers into one unit. That innovation provided great striking capacity, but also concentrated the vulnerable carriers into a compact target. Yamamoto also oversaw the organization of a similar large land-based organization in the 11th Air Fleet, which later used the G3M and G4M to neutralize American air forces in the Philippines and sink the British Force Z.

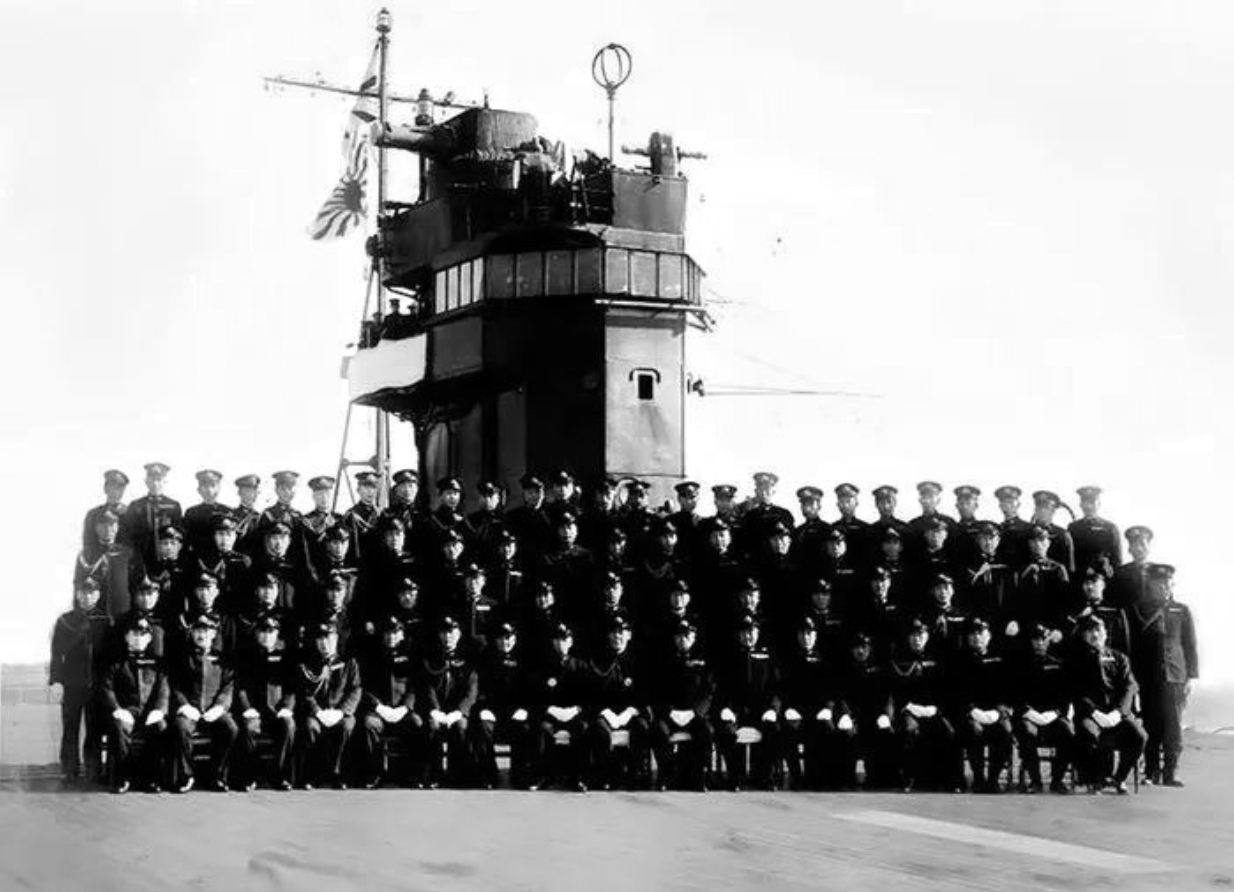
Yamamoto (first row, 8th right) and his staff on the deck of Akagi, December 25, 1941

In January 1941, Yamamoto went even further and proposed a radical revision of Japanese naval strategy. For two decades, in keeping with the doctrine of Captain Alfred T. Mahan, the Naval General Staff had planned in terms of Japanese light surface forces, submarines, and land-based air units whittling down the American fleet as it advanced across the Pacific until the Japanese Navy engaged it in a climactic Kantai Kessen ("decisive battle") in the northern Philippine Sea (between the Ryukyu Islands and the Marianas), with battleships fighting in traditional battle lines.

Correctly pointing out this plan had never worked even in Japanese war games, and painfully aware of American strategic advantages in military production capacity, Yamamoto proposed instead to seek parity with the Americans by first reducing their forces with a preventive strike, then following up with a "decisive battle" fought offensively, rather than defensively. Yamamoto hoped, but probably did not believe, that if the Americans could be dealt terrific blows early in the war, they might be willing to negotiate an end to the conflict. The Naval General Staff proved reluctant to go along, and Yamamoto was eventually driven to capitalize on his popularity in the fleet by threatening to resign to get his way. Admiral Osami Nagano and the Naval General Staff eventually caved in to this pressure, but only insofar as approving the attack on Pearl Harbor.

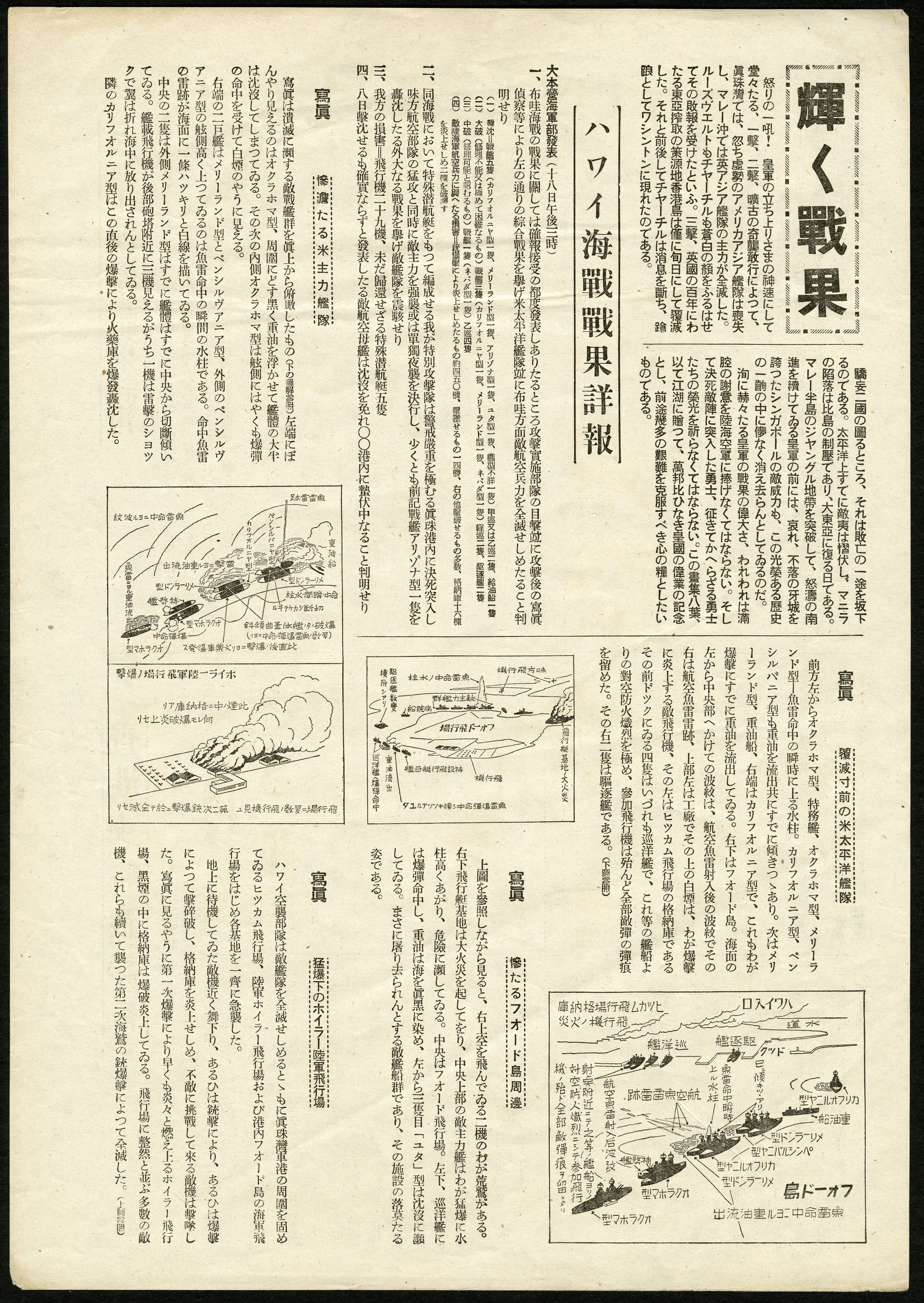
Japanese attack plan at Pearl Harbor, Japan, 1941

In January 1941 Yamamoto began developing a plan to attack the American base in Pearl Harbor, Hawaii, which the Japanese continued to refine during the next months. On November 5, 1941, Yamamoto in his "Top Secret Operation Order no. 1" issued to the Combined Fleet, the Empire of Japan must drive out Britain and America from Greater East Asia and hasten the settlement of China, whereas, in the event that Britain and America were driven out from the Philippines and Dutch East Indies, an independent, self-supporting economic entity will be firmly established—mirroring the principle of the Greater East Asia Co-Prosperity Sphere in another personification.

Two days later, he set the date for the intended surprise attack in Pearl Harbor and that would be on December 7 for one simple reason: it was a Sunday, the day that American military personnel would be least alert to an attack.

The First Air Fleet commenced preparations for the Pearl Harbor raid, solving a number of technical problems along the way, including how to launch torpedoes in the shallow waters of Pearl Harbor and how to craft armor-piercing bombs by machining down battleship gun projectiles.

=== Attack on Pearl Harbor ===
The United States and Japan were officially at peace when the First Air Fleet of six carriers attacked on December 7, 1941. Three hundred and fifty three aircraft were launched against Pearl Harbor and other locations within Honolulu in two waves. The attack was a success according to the parameters of the mission, which sought to sink at least four American battleships and prevent the United States from interfering in Japan's southward advance for at least six months. Three American aircraft carriers were also considered a choice target, but these were at sea at the time.

In the end, four American battleships were sunk, four were damaged, and eleven other cruisers, destroyers, and auxiliaries were sunk or seriously damaged, 188 American aircraft were destroyed and 159 others damaged, and 2,403 people were killed and 1,178 others wounded. The Japanese lost 64 servicemen and only 29 aircraft, with 74 others damaged by anti-aircraft fire from the ground. The damaged aircraft were disproportionately dive and torpedo bombers, seriously reducing the ability to exploit the first two waves' success, so the commander of the First Air Fleet, Naval Vice Admiral Chuichi Nagumo, withdrew. Yamamoto later lamented Nagumo's failure to seize the initiative to seek out and destroy the American carriers or further bombard various strategically important facilities on Oahu, such as Pearl Harbor's oil tanks.

Nagumo had absolutely no idea where the American carriers were, and remaining on station while his forces looked for them ran the risk of his own forces being found first and attacked while his aircraft were absent searching. In any case, insufficient daylight remained after recovering the aircraft from the first two waves for the carriers to launch and recover a third before dark, and Nagumo's escorting destroyers lacked the fuel capacity to loiter long. Much has been made of Yamamoto's hindsight, but in keeping with Japanese military tradition to not criticize the commander on the spot, he did not punish Nagumo for his withdrawal. On the strategic, moral, and political level, the attack was a disaster for Japan, rousing Americans' thirst for revenge due to what is famously called a "sneak attack". The shock of the attack, coming in an unexpected place with devastating results and without a declaration of war, galvanized the American public's determination to avenge the attack. When asked by Prime Minister Fumimaro Konoe in mid-1941 about the outcome of a possible war with the United States, Yamamoto made a well-known and prophetic statement: If ordered to fight, he said, "I shall run wild considerably for the first six months or a year, but I have utterly no confidence for the second and third years." His prediction would be validated, because Japan easily conquered territories and islands in Asia and the Pacific during the first six months of the war, before suffering a major defeat at the Battle of Midway on June 4–7, 1942, which ultimately tilted the balance of power in the Pacific toward the United States.

== December 1941 – May 1942 ==
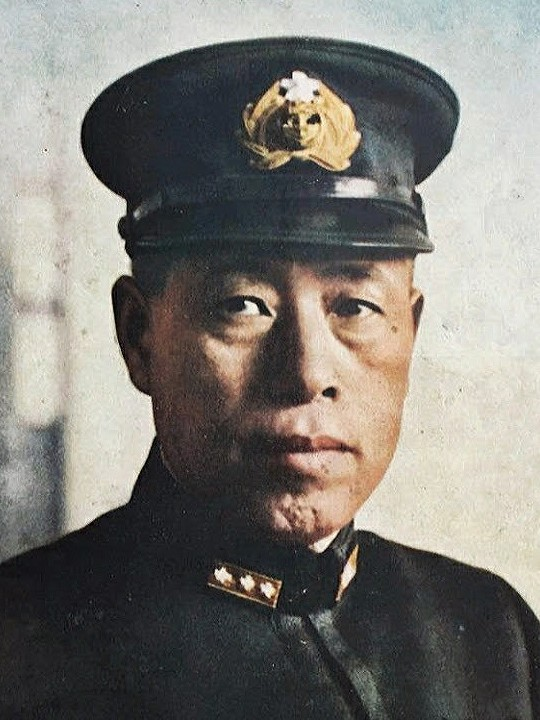
Yamamoto as Admiral, 1942

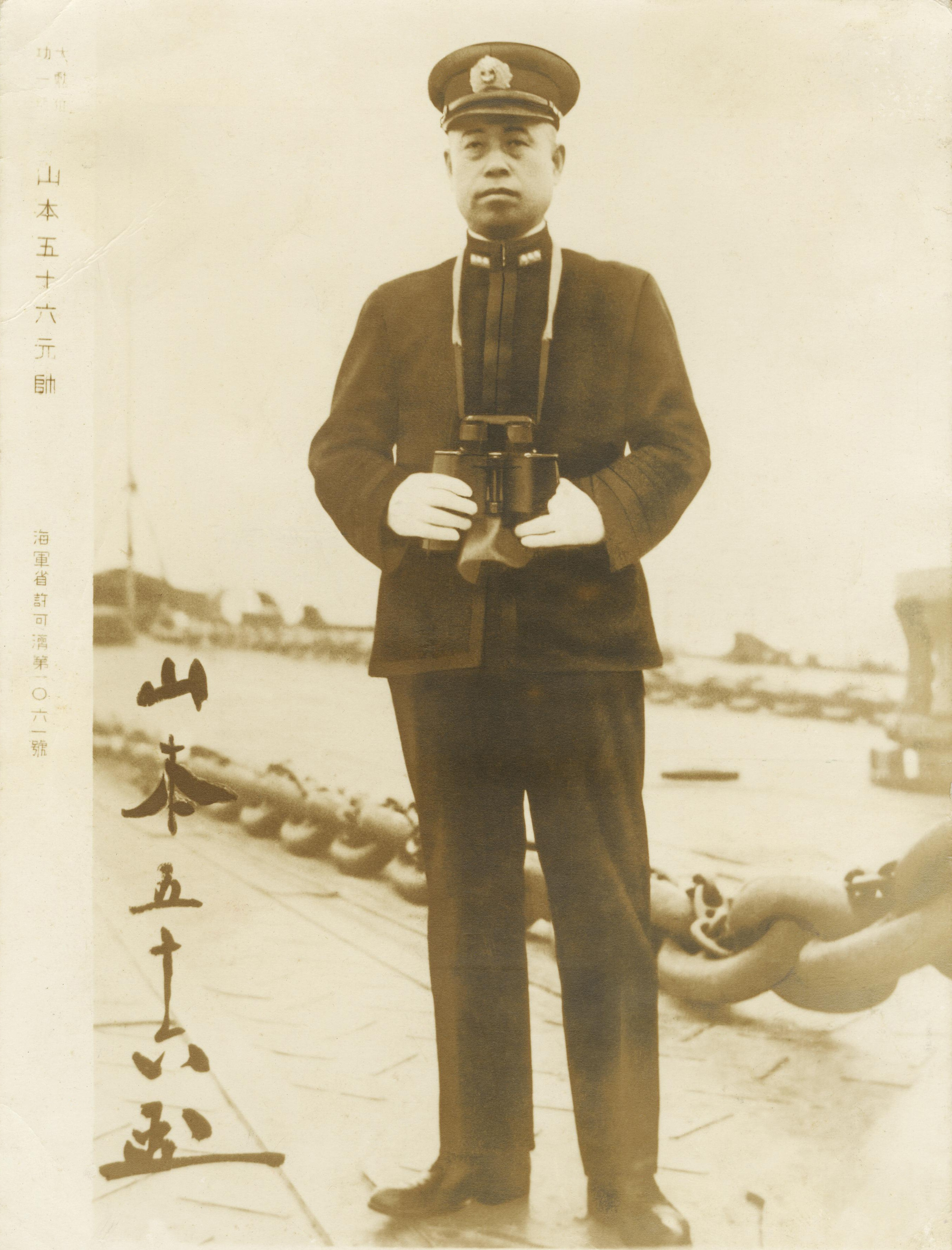
Yamamoto on deck, 1942

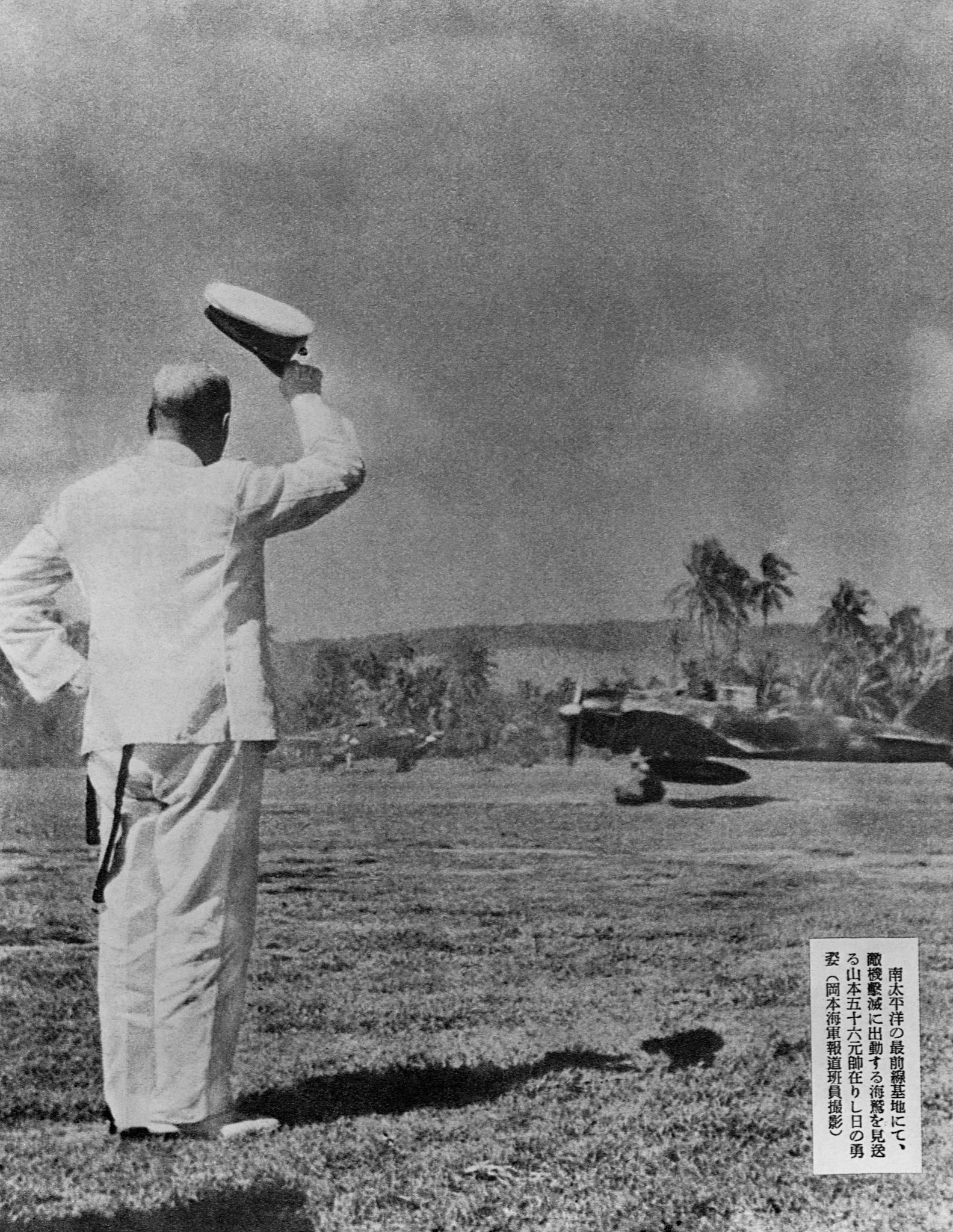
Admiral Yamamoto on the Japanese airbase of Rabaul on New Britain

With the American fleet largely neutralized at Pearl Harbor, Yamamoto's Combined Fleet turned to the task of executing the larger Japanese war plan devised by the Imperial Japanese Army and Navy General Staff. The First Air Fleet made a circuit of the Pacific, striking American, Australian, Dutch, and British installations from Wake Island to Australia to Ceylon in the Indian Ocean. The 11th Air Fleet caught the United States Fifth Air Force on the ground in the Philippines hours after Pearl Harbor, and then sank the British Force Z's battleship HMS Prince of Wales and battlecruiser HMS Repulse at sea.

Under Yamamoto's able subordinates, Vice Admirals Jisaburō Ozawa, Nobutake Kondō, and Ibō Takahashi, the Japanese swept the inadequate remaining American, British, Dutch and Australian naval assets from the Dutch East Indies in a series of amphibious landings and surface naval battles culminating in the Battle of the Java Sea on February 27, 1942. Along with the occupation of the Dutch East Indies came the fall of Singapore on February 15, and the eventual reduction of the remaining American-Filipino defensive positions in the Philippines on the Bataan peninsula on April 9 and Corregidor Island on May 6. The Japanese had secured their oil- and rubber-rich "southern resources area".

By late March, having achieved their initial aims with surprising speed and little loss, albeit against enemies ill-prepared to resist them, the Japanese paused to consider their next moves. Yamamoto and a few Japanese military leaders and officials waited, hoping that the United States or Great Britain would negotiate an armistice or a peace treaty to end the war. But when the British, as well as the Americans, expressed no interest in negotiating, Japanese thoughts turned to securing their newly seized territory and acquiring more with an eye to driving one or more of their enemies out of the war.

Competing plans were developed at this stage, including thrusts to the west against British India, south against Australia, and east against the United States. Yamamoto was involved in this debate, supporting different plans at different times with varying degrees of enthusiasm and for varying purposes, including horse-trading for support of his own objectives.

Plans included ideas as ambitious as invading India or Australia, or seizing Hawaii. These grandiose ventures were inevitably set aside, as the Army could not spare enough troops from China for the first two, which would require a minimum of 250,000 men, nor shipping to support the latter two (transports were allocated separately to the Navy and Army, and jealously guarded). Instead, the Imperial General Staff supported an army thrust into Burma in hopes of linking up with Indian nationalists revolting against British rule, and attacks in New Guinea and the Solomon Islands designed to imperil Australia's lines of communication with the United States. Yamamoto argued for a decisive offensive strike in the east to finish off the American fleet, but the more conservative Naval General Staff officers were unwilling to risk it.

On April 18, in the midst of these debates, the Doolittle Raid struck Tokyo and surrounding areas, demonstrating the threat posed by American aircraft carriers, and giving Yamamoto an event he could exploit to get his way, and further debate over military strategy came to a quick end. The Naval General Staff agreed to Yamamoto's Midway Island (MI) Operation, subsequent to the first phase of the operations against Australia's link with America, and concurrent with its plan to invade the Aleutian Islands.

Yamamoto rushed planning for the Midway and Aleutians missions, while dispatching a force under Vice Admiral Takeo Takagi, including the Fifth Carrier Division (the large new carriers Shōkaku and Zuikaku), to support the effort to seize the islands of Tulagi and Guadalcanal for seaplane and airplane bases, and the town of Port Moresby on Papua New Guinea's south coast facing Australia.

The Port Moresby (MO) Operation proved an unwelcome setback. Although Tulagi and Guadalcanal were taken, the Port Moresby invasion fleet was compelled to turn back when Takagi clashed with an American carrier task force in the Battle of the Coral Sea in early May. Although the Japanese sank the carrier USS Lexington and damaged the USS Yorktown, the Americans damaged the carrier Shōkaku so badly that she required dockyard repairs, and the Japanese lost the light carrier Shoho. Just as importantly, Japanese operational mishaps and American fighters and anti-aircraft fire devastated the dive bomber and torpedo plane formations of both Shōkaku's and Zuikaku's air groups. These losses sidelined Zuikaku while she awaited replacement aircraft and aircrews, and saw to tactical integration and training. These two ships would be sorely missed a month later at Midway.

== Battle of Midway, June 1942 ==
Yamamoto's plan for Midway Island was an extension of his efforts to knock the American Pacific Fleet out of action long enough for Japan to fortify its defensive perimeter in the Pacific island chains. Yamamoto felt it necessary to seek an early, decisive offensive battle.

This plan was long believed to have been to draw American attention—and possibly carrier forces—north from Pearl Harbor by sending his Fifth Fleet (one carrier, one light carrier, four battleships, eight cruisers, 25 destroyers, and four transports) against the Aleutians, raiding Dutch Harbor on Unalaska Island and invading the more distant islands of Kiska and Attu.

While Fifth Fleet attacked the Aleutians, First Mobile Force (four carriers, two battleships, three cruisers, and 12 destroyers) would attack Midway and destroy its air force. Once this was neutralized, Second Fleet (one light carrier, two battleships, 10 cruisers, 21 destroyers, and 11 transports) would land 5,000 troops to seize the atoll from the United States Marines.

The seizure of Midway was expected to draw the American carriers west into a trap where the First Mobile Force would engage and destroy them. Afterwards, First Fleet (one light carrier, three battleships, one light cruiser and nine destroyers), in conjunction with elements of Second Fleet, would mop up remaining US surface forces and complete the destruction of the American Pacific Fleet.

To guard against failure, Yamamoto initiated two security measures. The first was an aerial reconnaissance mission (Operation K) over Pearl Harbor to ascertain if the American carriers were there. The second was a picket line of submarines to detect the movement of enemy carriers toward Midway in time for First Mobile Force, First Fleet, and Second Fleet to combine against it. In the event, the first measure was aborted and the second delayed until after the American carriers had already sortied.

The plan was a compromise and hastily prepared, apparently so it could be launched in time for the anniversary of the Battle of Tsushima, but appeared well thought out, well organized, and finely timed, from a Japanese viewpoint. Against four fleet carriers, two light carriers, seven battleships, 14 cruisers and 42 destroyers likely to be in the area of the main battle, the United States could field only three carriers, eight cruisers, and 15 destroyers. The disparity appeared crushing. Only in numbers of carrier decks, available aircraft, and submarines was there near parity between the two sides. Despite various mishaps developed in the execution, it appeared that—barring something unforeseen—Yamamoto held all the cards.

Unknown to Yamamoto, the Americans had learned of Japanese plans thanks to the code breaking of Japanese naval code D (known to the US as JN-25). As a result, Admiral Chester Nimitz, the Pacific Fleet commander, was able to place his outnumbered forces in a position to conduct their own ambush. By Nimitz's calculation, his three available carrier decks, plus Midway, gave him rough parity with Nagumo's First Mobile Force.

Following a nuisance raid by Japanese flying boats in May, Nimitz dispatched a minesweeper to guard the intended refueling point for Operation K near French Frigate Shoals, causing the reconnaissance mission to be aborted and leaving Yamamoto ignorant of whether the Pacific Fleet carriers were still at Pearl Harbor. It remains unclear why Yamamoto permitted the earlier attack, and why his submarines did not sortie sooner, as reconnaissance was essential to success at Midway. Nimitz also dispatched his carriers toward Midway early, and they passed the Japanese submarines en route to their picket line positions. Nimitz's carriers positioned themselves to ambush the Kidō Butai (striking force) when it struck Midway. A token cruiser and destroyer force was sent toward the Aleutians, but otherwise Nimitz ignored them. On June 4, 1942, days before Yamamoto expected them to interfere in the Midway operation, American carrier-based aircraft destroyed the four carriers of the Kidō Butai, catching the Japanese carriers at especially vulnerable times.

With his air power destroyed and his forces not yet concentrated for a fleet battle, Yamamoto maneuvered his remaining forces, still strong on paper, to trap the American forces. He was unable to do so because his initial dispositions had placed his surface combatants too far from Midway, and because Admiral Raymond Spruance prudently withdrew to the east to further defend Midway Island, believing (based on a mistaken submarine report) the Japanese still intended to invade. Not knowing several battleships, including the powerful Yamato, were in the Japanese order of battle, he did not comprehend the severe risk of a night surface battle, in which his carriers and cruisers would be at a disadvantage. However, his move to the east avoided that possibility. Correctly perceiving he had lost and could not bring surface forces into action, Yamamoto withdrew. The defeat marked the high tide of Japanese expansion.

Yamamoto's plan has been the subject of much criticism. Some historians state it violated the principle of concentration of force and was overly complex. Others point to similarly complex Allied operations, such as Operation MB8, that were successful, and note the extent to which the American intelligence coup derailed the operation before it began. Had Yamamoto's dispositions not denied Nagumo adequate pre-attack reconnaissance assets, both the American cryptanalytic success and the unexpected appearance of the American carriers could have been irrelevant.

== Actions after Midway ==
The Battle of Midway checked Japanese momentum, but the Japanese Navy was still a powerful force, capable of regaining the initiative. It planned to resume the thrust with Operation FS, aimed at eventually taking Fiji and Samoa to cut the American lifeline to Australia.

The Japanese public wasn't told of the loss, and Yamamoto remained as commander-in-chief of the Japanese Combined Fleet. However, he had lost some of his credibility within the Navy as a result of the Midway defeat. He was typically aggressive, but from this point onward, the Naval General Staff were disinclined to indulge in further gambles. Yamamoto thereby ended up in the battle of attrition that he had attempted to avoid.

Yamamoto committed Combined Fleet units to a series of small attrition actions across the south and central Pacific that stung the Americans, but in return suffered losses he could ill afford. Three major efforts to beat the Americans moving on Guadalcanal precipitated a pair of carrier battles that Yamamoto commanded personally: the Battles of the Eastern Solomons and Santa Cruz Islands in September and October, respectively, and finally a pair of wild surface engagements in November, all timed to coincide with Japanese Army pushes. Yamamoto's naval forces won a few victories and inflicted considerable losses and damage to the American fleet in several battles around Guadalcanal which included the Battles of Savo Island, Cape Esperance, and Tassafaronga, but despite these, he was unable to fully supply the Japanese army troops on the island. Also, the battle of attrition was in particularly a negative for Japan since the trained aviators were not being replaced.

== Death ==
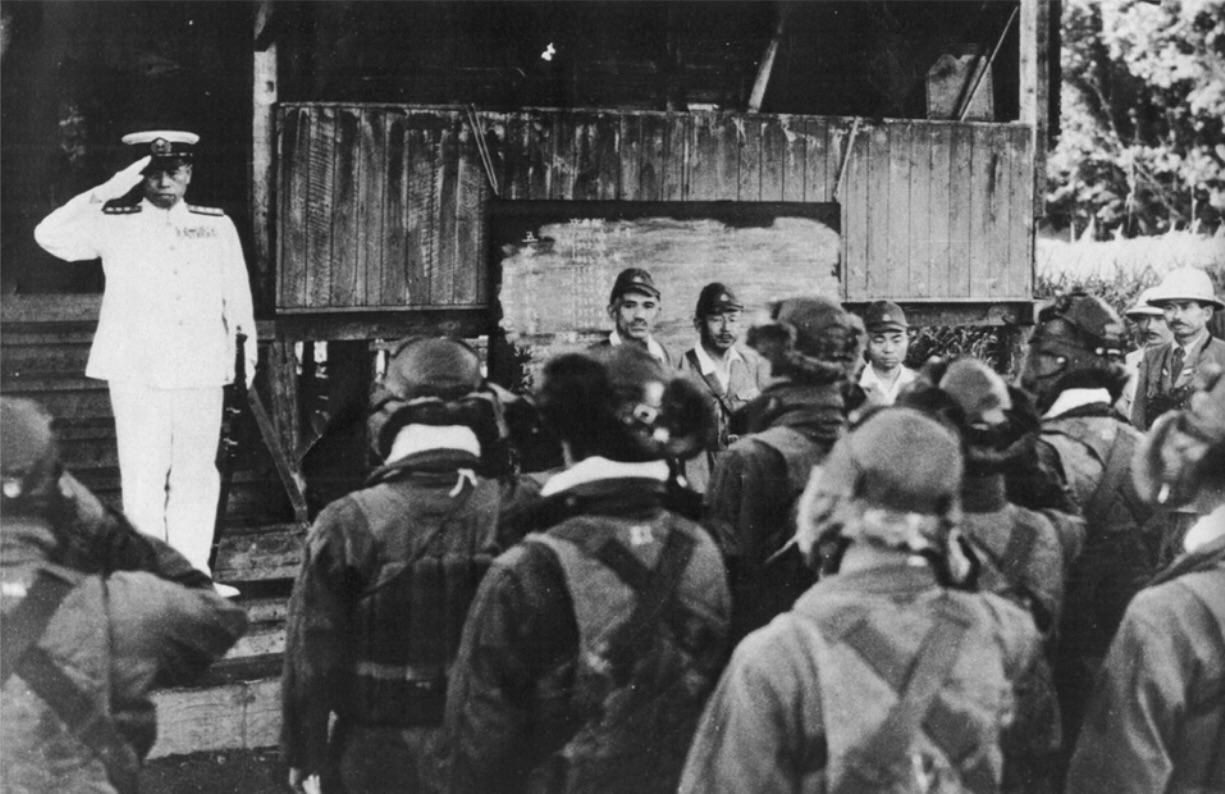
Admiral Yamamoto, a few hours before his death, saluting Japanese naval pilots at Rabaul, April 18, 1943

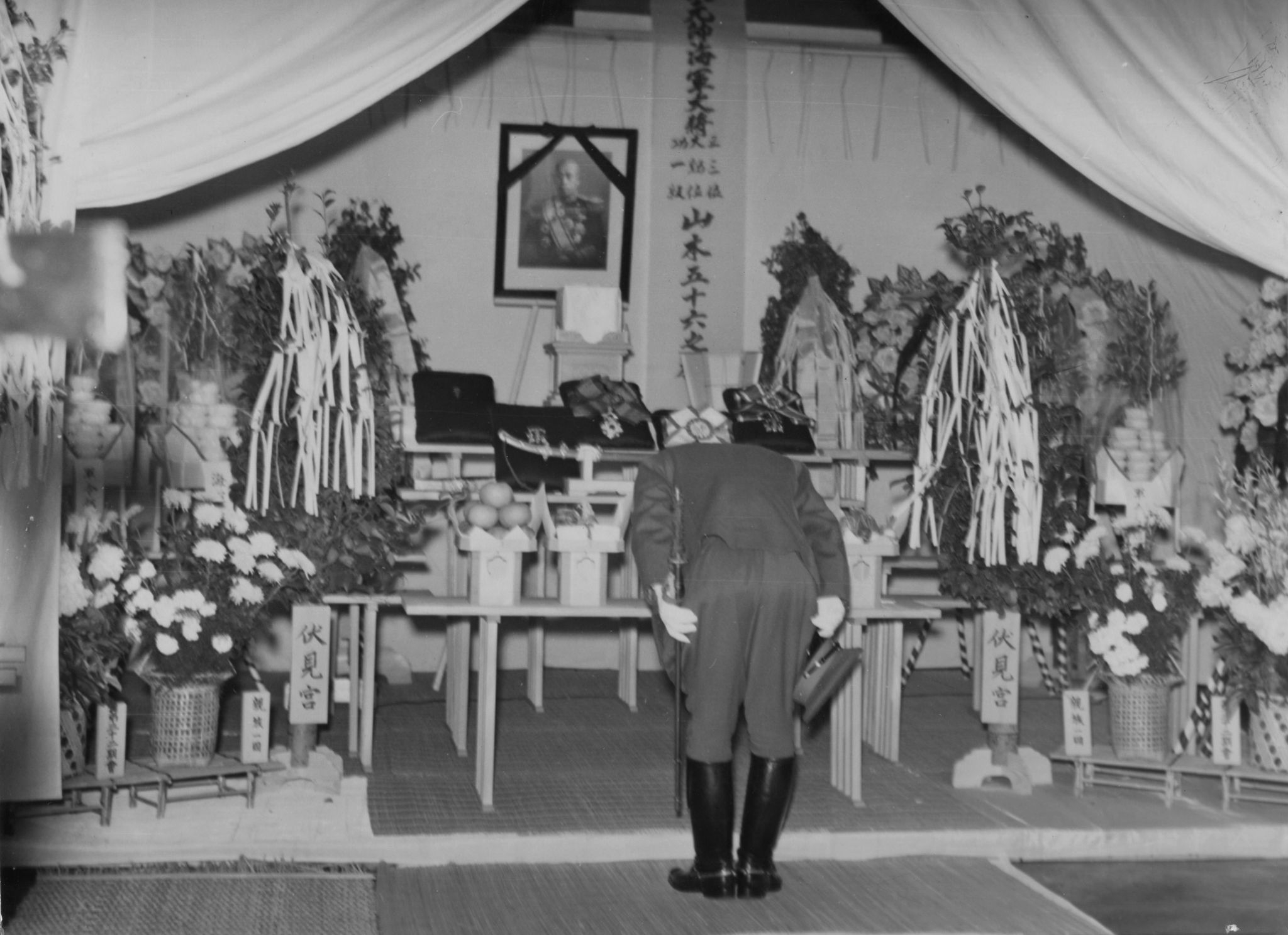
Prime Minister Hideki Tojo bowing to a portrait of Yamamoto, following the return of his ashes to Japan, May 1943

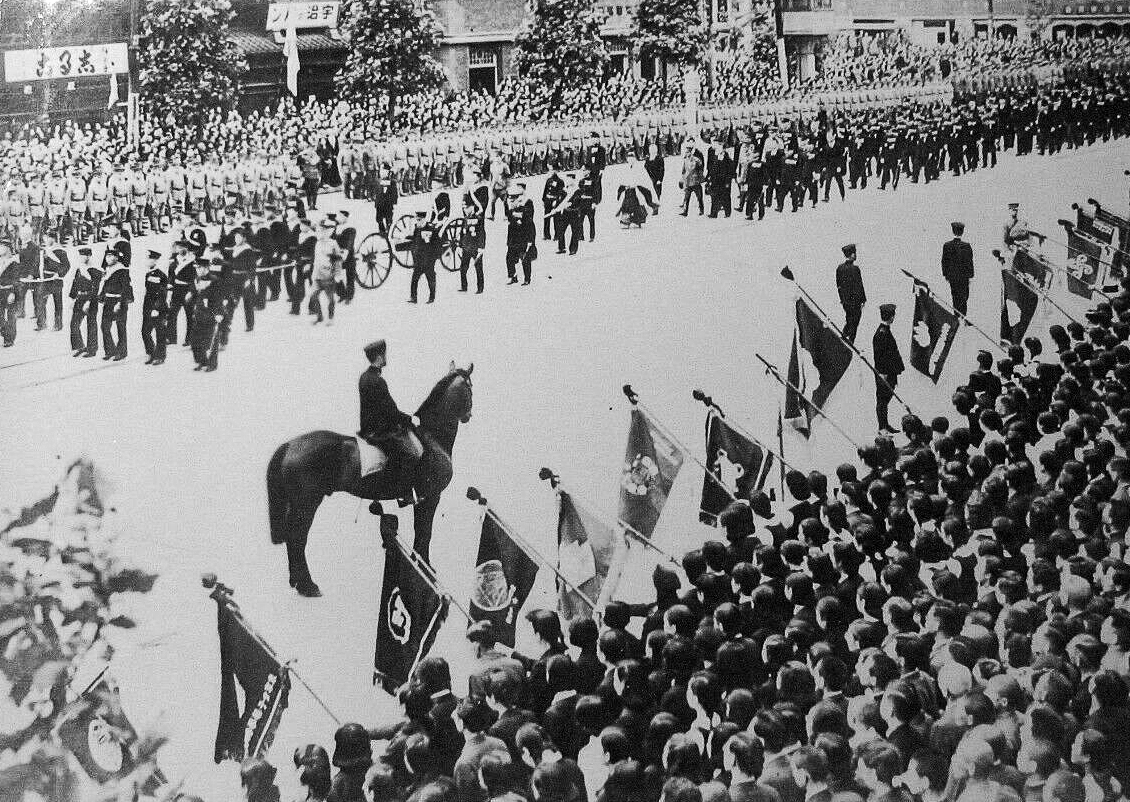
Yamamoto's state funeral, 5 June 1943

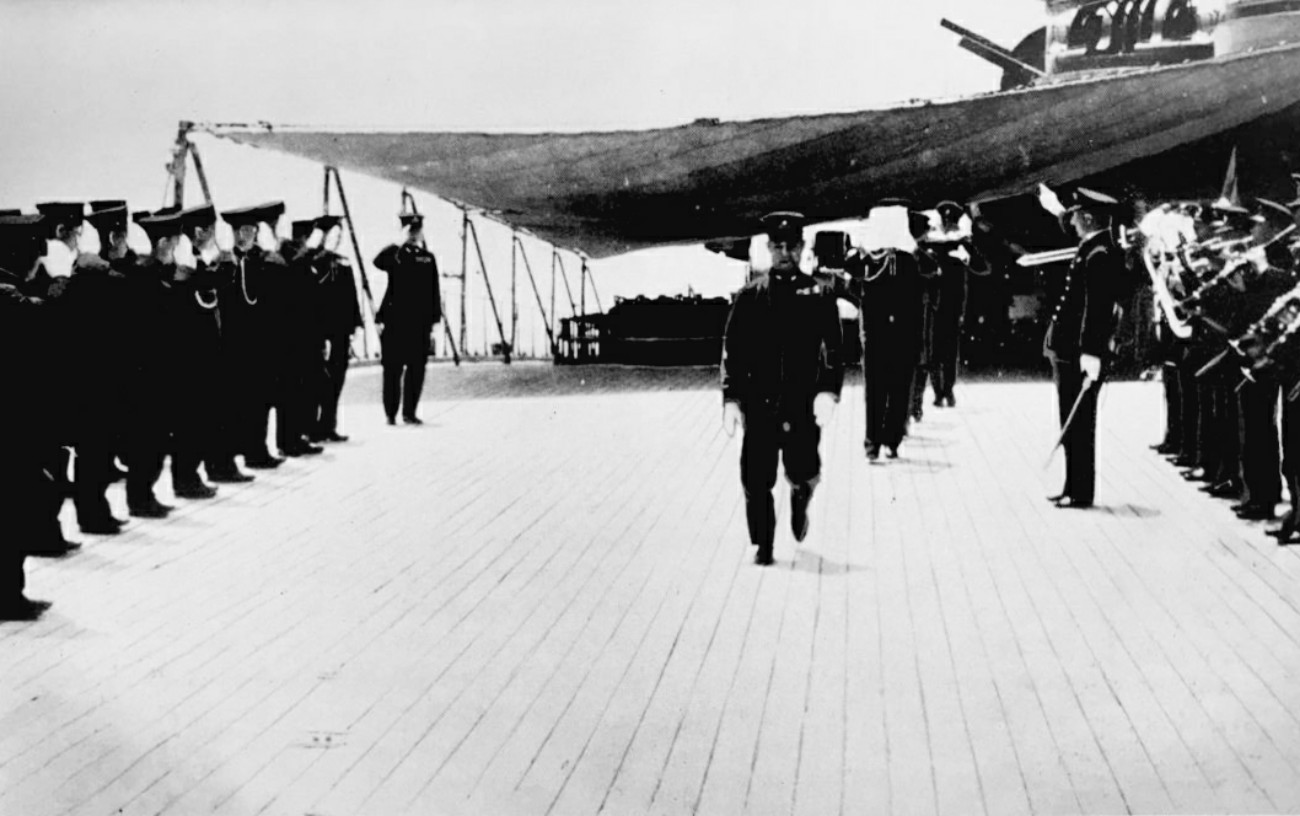
Yamamoto's ashes are carried from the battleship Musashi at Kisarazu, Japan on May 23, 1943.

To boost morale following the defeat at Guadalcanal, Yamamoto decided to make an inspection tour throughout the South Pacific. It was during this tour that U.S. officials commenced an operation to kill him. On April 14, 1943, the United States naval intelligence effort, codenamed "Magic", intercepted and decrypted a message containing specifics of Yamamoto's tour, including arrival and departure times and locations, as well as the number and types of aircraft that would transport and accompany him on the journey. Yamamoto, the itinerary revealed, would be flying from Rabaul to Balalae Airfield, on an island near Bougainville in the Solomon Islands, on the morning of April 18, 1943.

President Franklin D. Roosevelt may have authorized Secretary of the Navy Frank Knox to "get Yamamoto", but no official record of such an order exists, and sources disagree whether he did so. Knox essentially let Admiral Chester W. Nimitz make the decision. Nimitz first consulted Admiral William Halsey Jr., Commander, South Pacific, and then authorized the mission on April 17 to intercept and shoot down Yamamoto's flight en route. A squadron of United States Army Air Forces Lockheed P-38 Lightning aircraft were assigned the task as only they possessed sufficient range. Select pilots from three units were informed that they were intercepting an "important high officer", with no specific name given.

On the morning of April 18, despite urging by local commanders to cancel the trip for fear of ambush, Yamamoto's two Mitsubishi G4M "Betty" bombers, used as fast transport aircraft without bombs, left Rabaul as scheduled for the 315 mi (507 km) trip. Sixteen P-38s intercepted the flight over Bougainville, and a dogfight ensued between them and the six escorting Mitsubishi A6M Zeroes. First Lieutenant Rex T. Barber engaged the first of the two Japanese transports, which turned out to be T1-323, the one Yamamoto was travelling in. He fired on the aircraft until it began to spew smoke from its left engine. Barber turned away to attack the other transport as Yamamoto's aircraft crashed into the jungle.

Yamamoto's body, along with the crash site, (6°47'09.9"S 155°33'08.2"E) was found the next day in the jungle of the island of Bougainville by a Japanese search-and-rescue party, led by army engineer Lieutenant Tsuyoshi Hamasuna. According to Hamasuna, Yamamoto had been thrown clear of the plane's wreckage, his white-gloved hand grasping the hilt of his katana, still upright in his seat under a tree. Hamasuna said Yamamoto was instantly recognizable, head dipped down as if deep in thought. A post-mortem disclosed that Yamamoto had received two .50-caliber bullet wounds, one to the back of his left shoulder and another to the left side of his lower jaw that exited above his right eye. The Japanese navy doctor examining the body determined that the head wound had killed Yamamoto. The more violent details of Yamamoto's death were hidden from the Japanese public. The medical report was changed "on orders from above", according to biographer Hiroyuki Agawa.

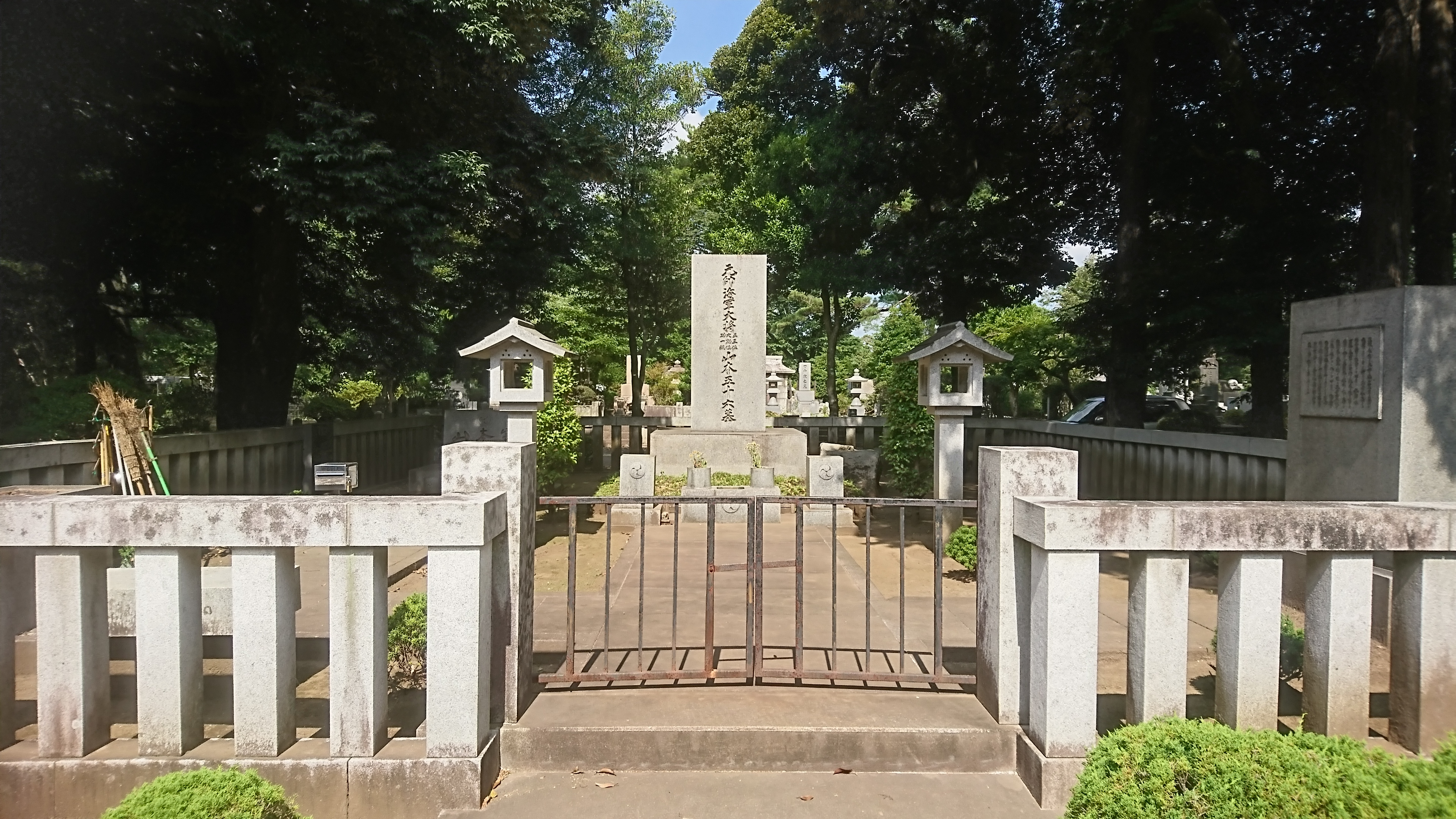
Yamamoto's grave at Tama Cemetery

Yamamoto's death was a major blow to Japanese military morale. His staff cremated his remains at Buin, Papua New Guinea, and his ashes were returned to Tokyo aboard the battleship Musashi, his last flagship. He was given a full state funeral on June 5, 1943, where he received, posthumously, the title of Marshal Admiral and was awarded the Order of the Chrysanthemum (1st Class). He was also awarded Nazi Germany's Knight's Cross of the Iron Cross with Oak Leaves and Swords. Some of his ashes were buried in the public Tama Cemetery, Tokyo (多摩霊園) and the remainder at his ancestral burial grounds at the temple of Chuko-ji in Nagaoka City. He was succeeded as commander-in-chief of the Combined Fleet by Admiral Mineichi Koga.

== Personal life ==
Yamamoto practiced calligraphy. He and his wife, Reiko, had four children: two sons and two daughters. Yamamoto was an avid gambler, enjoying Go, shogi, billiards, bridge, mahjong, poker, and other games that tested his wits and sharpened his mind. He frequently made jokes about moving to Monaco and starting his own casino.

He enjoyed the company of geisha, and his wife Reiko revealed to the Japanese public in 1954 that Yamamoto was closer to his favorite geisha Kawai Chiyoko than to her, which stirred some controversy. His funeral procession passed by Kawai's quarters on the way to the cemetery. Yamamoto was close friends with Teikichi Hori, a Navy admiral and Yamamoto's classmate from the Imperial Japanese Naval Academy, who was purged from the Navy for supporting the Washington Naval Treaty. Before and during the war Yamamoto frequently corresponded with Hori, these personal letters would become the subject of the NHK documentary The Truth of Yamamoto.

The claim that Yamamoto was a Catholic is likely due to confusion with retired Admiral Shinjiro Stefano Yamamoto, who was a decade older than Isoroku, and died in 1942.

== Decorations ==
- Grand Cordon of the Order of the Chrysanthemum (posthumous appointment, 18 April 1943)
- Grand Cordon of the Order of the Rising Sun (29 April 1940; Fourth Class: 1 November 1920)
  - (with the Order of the Paulownia Flowers)
- Grand Cordon of the Order of the Sacred Treasure (23 March 1939; Second Class: 31 October 1931; Fifth Class: 27 November 1911)
- Order of the Golden Kite (1st class: 18 April 1943 (posthumous); Second Class: 4 April 1942)
- Grand Cross of the Order of the German Eagle (Nazi Germany, 9 February 1940)
- Knight's Cross of the Iron Cross with Oak Leaves and Swords (Nazi Germany, 27 May 1943 (posthumous))

=== Dates of rank ===
- Midshipman – November 14, 1904
- Ensign – August 31, 1905
- Sublieutenant – September 28, 1907
- Lieutenant – October 11, 1909
- Lieutenant Commander – December 13, 1915
- Commander – December 1, 1919
- Captain – December 1, 1923
- Rear Admiral – November 30, 1929
- Vice Admiral – November 15, 1934
- Admiral – November 15, 1940
- Marshal-Admiral – April 18, 1943 (posthumous)

== In film and fiction ==
Yamamoto was portrayed by Denjirō Ōkōchi in Toho's 1953 film Eagle of the Pacific.

The 1960 film The Gallant Hours depicts the battle of wits between Vice-Admiral William Halsey, Jr. and Yamamoto from the start of the Guadalcanal campaign in August 1942 to Yamamoto's death in April 1943. The film, however, portrays Yamamoto's death as occurring in November 1942, the day after the Naval Battle of Guadalcanal, and the P-38 aircraft that killed him as coming from Guadalcanal.

In 1960's Storm Over the Pacific from Toho Studios, Yamamoto is portrayed by Susumu Fujita.

In Daiei Studios's 1969 film Aa, kaigun (later released in the United States as Gateway to Glory), Yamamoto was portrayed by Shōgo Shimada.

Yamamoto is portrayed by Japanese actor Sō Yamamura in the 1970 movie Tora! Tora! Tora!; he states after the attack on Pearl Harbor:

I fear that all we have done is to awaken a sleeping giant and fill him with a terrible resolve.

— attributed to Yamamoto in Tora! Tora! Tora! (1970), in reference to the attack on Pearl Harbor. There is no evidence that Yamamoto said this in reality.

Professional wrestler Harold Watanabe adopted the villainous Japanese gimmick of Tojo Yamamoto in reference to both Yamamoto and Hideki Tojo.

Award-winning Japanese actor Toshiro Mifune (star of The Seven Samurai) portrayed Yamamoto in three films:

- Admiral Yamamoto (1968),
- Gekido no showashi 'Gunbatsu' (1970, lit. "Turning Point of Showa History: The Militarists"), and
- Midway (1976, where all of the Japanese scenes had English dialogue).

A fictionalized version of Yamamoto's death was portrayed in the Baa Baa Black Sheep episode "The Hawk Flies on Sunday", though only photos of Yamamoto were shown. In this episode, set much later in the war than in real life, the Black Sheep, a Marine Corsair squadron, joins an army squadron of P-51 Mustangs. The Marines intercepted fighter cover while the army shot down Yamamoto.

In Shūe Matsubayashi's 1981 film Rengō kantai (lit. "Combined Fleet", later released in the United States as The Imperial Navy), Yamamoto was portrayed by Keiju Kobayashi.

In the 1993 OVA series Konpeki no Kantai (lit. Deep Blue Fleet), right after his plane is shot down, Yamamoto suddenly wakes up as his younger self, Isoroku Takano, after the Battle of Tsushima in 1905. His memory from the original timeline intact, Yamamoto uses his knowledge of the future to help Japan become a stronger military power, eventually launching a coup d'état against Hideki Tōjō's government. In the subsequent Pacific War, Japan's technologically advanced navy decisively defeats the United States, and grants all of the former European and American colonies in Asia full independence. Yamamoto convinces Japan to join forces with the United States and Britain to defeat Nazi Germany. The series was criticized outside Japan as a whitewash of Imperial Japan's intentions towards its neighbors, and distancing itself from the wartime alliance with Nazi Germany.

In Neal Stephenson's 1999 book Cryptonomicon, Yamamoto's final moments are depicted, with him realizing that Japan's naval codes have been broken and that he must inform headquarters.

In the 2001 film Pearl Harbor, Yamamoto was portrayed by Japanese-born American actor Mako Iwamatsu. Like Tora! Tora! Tora!, Yamamoto also says the sleeping giant quote.

In the 2004 anime series Zipang, Yamamoto, voiced by Bunmei Tobayama, works to develop the uneasy partnership with the crew of the JMSDF Mirai, which has been transported back through time to 1942.

In the Axis of Time trilogy by author John Birmingham, after a naval task force from the year 2021 is accidentally transported back through time to 1942, Yamamoto assumes a leadership role in the dramatic alteration of Japan's war strategy.

In The West Wing episode "We Killed Yamamoto", the Chairman of the Joint Chiefs of Staff uses the killing of Yamamoto to advocate for a peacetime assassination.

In Douglas Niles' 2007 book MacArthur's War: A Novel of the Invasion of Japan (written with Michael Dobson), which focuses on General Douglas MacArthur and an alternate history of the Pacific War (following a considerably different outcome of the Battle of Midway), Yamamoto is portrayed sympathetically, with much of the action in the Japanese government seen through his eyes, though he could not change the major decisions of Japan in World War II.

In Toei's 2011 war film Rengō Kantai Shirei Chōkan: Yamamoto Isoroku (Blu-Ray titles:- English "The Admiral"; German "Der Admiral"), Yamamoto was portrayed by Kōji Yakusho. The film portrays his career from Pearl Harbor to his death in Operation Vengeance.

In Robert Conroy's 2011 book Rising Sun, Yamamoto directs the IJN to launch a series of attacks on the American West Coast, in the hope the United States can be convinced to sue for peace and securing Japan's place as a world power; but cannot escape his lingering fear the war will ultimately doom Japan.

In the 2019 motion picture Midway, Yamamoto is portrayed by Etsushi Toyokawa. As with Tora! Tora! Tora! and Pearl Harbor, the sleeping giant quote is included once again.

== Sources ==
- Agawa, Hiroyuki; Bester, John (trans.). The Reluctant Admiral. New York: Kodansha, 1979. ISBN 978-4-7700-2539-5. A definitive biography of Yamamoto in English. This book explains much of the political structure and events within Japan that led to the war.
- Coetzee, Daniel; Eysturlid, Lee W. (2013). Philosophers of War: The Evolution of History's Greatest Military Thinkers [2 Volumes]: The Evolution of History's Greatest Military Thinkers. ABC-CLIO. ISBN 9780313070334. - Total pages: 994
- Davis, Donald A. Lightning Strike: The Secret Mission to Kill Admiral Yamamoto and Avenge Pearl Harbor. New York: St. Martin's Press, 2005. ISBN 978-0-312-30906-0.
- Drabkin, Ronald. Admiral Yamamoto: The Gripping Story of the Legendary Japanese Naval Commander Who Planned and Executed the Attack on Pearl Harbor. Tokyo: Tuttle Publishing, 2026. ISBN 978-4-8053-2027-3.
- Dull, Paul S. A Battle History of the Imperial Japanese Navy, 1941–1945. Annapolis, Maryland: Naval Institute Press, 1978. ISBN 978-0-87021-097-6.
- Evans, David C. and Mark R. Peattie. Kaigun: Strategy, Tactics, and Technology in the Imperial Japanese Navy 1887–1941. Annapolis, Maryland: Naval Institute Press, 1997. ISBN 978-0-87021-192-8.
- Glines, Carroll V. Attack on Yamamoto (1st edition). New York: Crown, 1990. ISBN 978-0-517-57728-8. Glines documents both the mission to shoot down Yamamoto and the subsequent controversies with thorough research, including personal interviews with all surviving participants and researchers who examined the crash site.
- Lundstrom, John B. The First Team: Pacific Naval Air Combat from Pearl Harbor to Midway. Annapolis, Maryland: Naval Institute Press, 1984. ISBN 978-0-87021-189-8.
- Miller, Edward S. War Plan Orange: The U.S. Strategy to Defeat Japan, 1897–1945. Annapolis, Maryland: Naval Institute Press, 1991. ISBN 978-0-87021-759-3.
- Peattie, Mark R. Sunburst: The Rise of Japanese Naval Air Power, 1909–1941. Annapolis, Maryland: Naval Institute Press, 2002. ISBN 978-1-55750-432-6.
- Prados, John. Combined Fleet Decoded: The Secret History of American Intelligence and the Japanese Navy in World War II. Annapolis, Maryland: Naval Institute Press, 2001. ISBN 978-1-55750-431-9.
- Prange, Gordon. At Dawn We Slept. New York: Penguin Books, 1982. ISBN 978-0-14-006455-1.
- Ugaki, Matome; Chihaya, Masataka (trans.). Fading Victory: The Diary of Admiral Matome Ugaki, 1941–45. Pittsburgh: University of Pittsburgh Press, 1991. ISBN 978-0-8229-5462-0. Provides a high-level view of the war from the Japanese side, from the diaries of Yamamoto's Chief of Staff, Admiral Matome Ugaki. Provides evidence of the intentions of the imperial military establishment to seize Hawaii and to operate against Britain's Royal Navy in the Indian Ocean. Translated by Masataka Chihaya, this edition contains extensive clarifying notes from the U.S. editors derived from U.S. military histories.
- Parillo, Mark (2006). "The United States in the Pacific". In Higham, Robin; Harris, Stephen (eds.). Why Air Forces Fail: the Anatomy of Defeat. The University Press of Kentucky. ISBN 978-0-8131-2374-5.
- Ryfle, Steve; Godziszewski, Ed (2017). Ishiro Honda: A Life in Film, from Godzilla to Kurosawa. Wesleyan University Press. ISBN 9780819570871.

Military offices
Preceded by Tsudome Takemi	Isuzu; Commanding Officer; August 20 – December 10, 1928	Succeeded by Hani Rokurō
Preceded by Kobayashi Seizaburō	Akagi; Commanding Officer; December 10, 1928 – October 8, 1929	Succeeded by Kitagawa Kiyoshi
Preceded by Oikawa Koshirō	First Carrier Division; Commander; October 3, 1933 – June 1, 1934	Succeeded by Wada Hideo
Preceded by Shiozawa Kōichi	Naval Aviation Bureau; Director; December 2, 1935 – December 1, 1936	Succeeded by Oikawa Koshirō
Political offices
Preceded by Hasegawa Kiyoshi	Vice-Minister of the Navy; December 1, 1936 – August 30, 1939	Succeeded by Sumiyama Tokutarō
Military offices
Preceded by Oikawa Koshirō	Naval Aviation Bureau; Director; April 25 – November 15, 1938	Succeeded by Toyoda Teijirō
Preceded by Yoshida Zengo	1st Fleet; Commander-in-chief; August 30, 1939 – August 11, 1941	Succeeded by Takasu Shirō
Preceded by Yoshida Zengo	Combined Fleet; Commander-in-chief; August 30, 1939 – April 18, 1943	Succeeded by Koga Mineichi
