= Nagaoka Domain =

Japanese feudal estate

Nagaoka Domain 長岡藩
- Domain of Japan
- 1616–1870
- Flag Coat of arms
- Capital: Nagaoka Castle
  - Type: Daimyō
- Historical era: Edo period
  - Established: 1616
  - Disestablished: 1870
Preceded by	Succeeded by
Echigo Province	Kashiwaza Prefecture
- Today part of: Niigata Prefecture

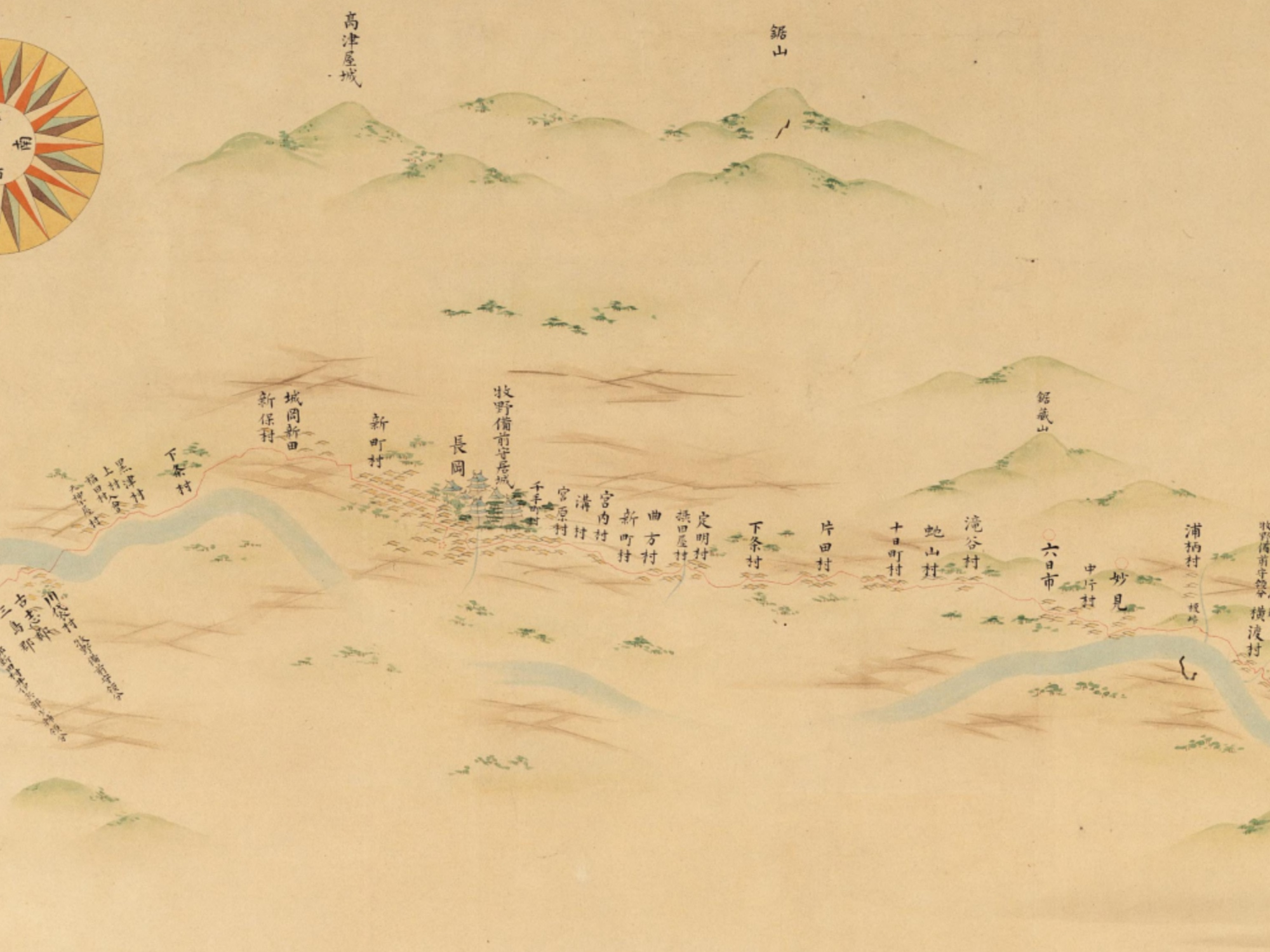
Map of Nagaoka Domain area from Dai Nihon Enkai Yochi Zenzu

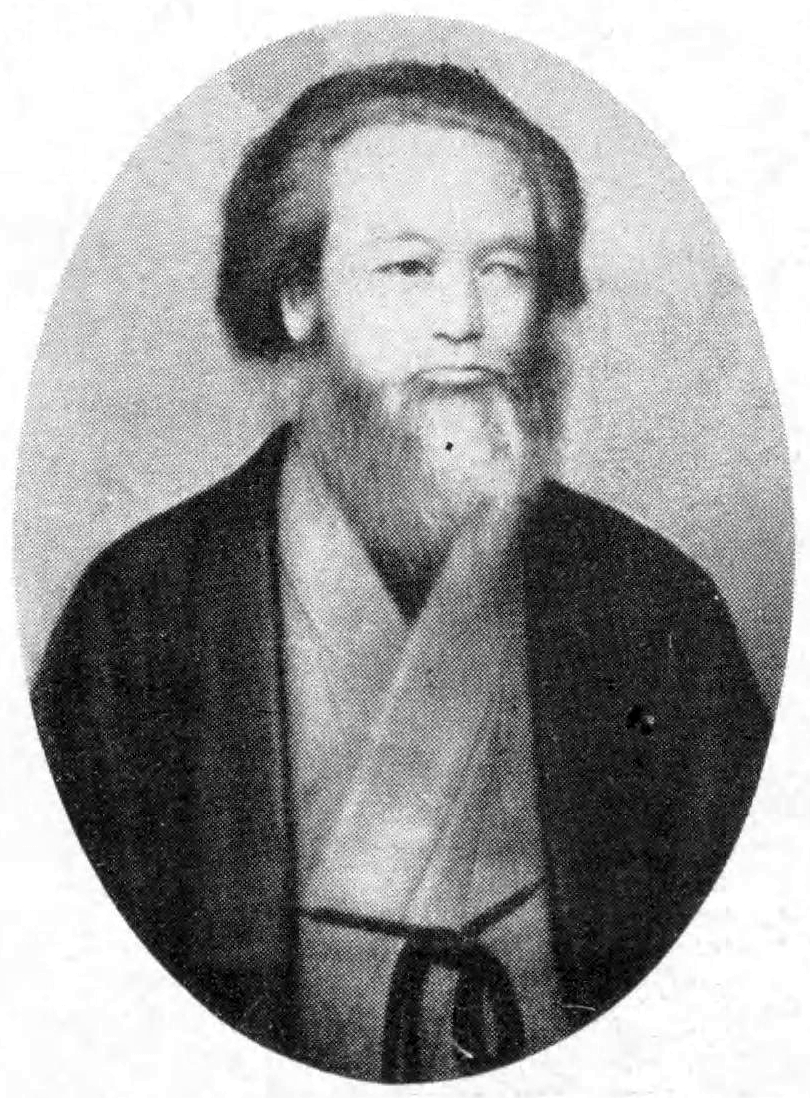
Kobayashi Torasaburō, senior Nagaoka official during the late Edo period

Nagaoka Domain (長岡藩, Nagaoka-han) was a fudai feudal domain under the Tokugawa shogunate of Edo period Japan. It is located in Echigo Province, Honshū. The domain was centered at Nagaoka Castle, located in what is now part of the city of Nagaoka in Niigata Prefecture. It was often referred to as Echigo-Nagaoka Domain (越後長岡藩, Echigo-Nagaoka-han) to disambiguate itself from the smaller Yamashiro-Nagaoka Domain (山城長岡藩, Yamashiro-Nagaoka-han) in what is now Nagaokakyo, Kyoto. The domain was ruled by the Makino clan for most of its history. During the summer of 1868, it was the center of some of the fiercest fighting during the Boshin War. Admiral Yamamoto Isoroku was the son of a Nagaoka samurai.

== History ==
The territory of Nagaoka Domain was originally part of the holdings of Takada Domain with the exception of a 60,000 koku holding called Zaodo Domain (蔵王堂藩, Zaodo-han) held by a branch of the Hori clan for their services to Toyotomi Hideyoshi. After the daimyō of Takada Domain, Matsudaira Tadateru was disgraced at the Siege of Osaka in 1616 and relieved of his holdings, Hori Naoyori was awarded with Zaodo Domain and an additional 20,000 koku from the former Takada lands. He quickly saw that the seat of Zaodo Domain was in a poor location prone to flooding by the Shinano River, and built a new castle on the high ground on the opposite back at what is now Nagaoka. This marked the start of Nagaoka Domain. In 1618, he was transferred to Murakami Domain, and Nagaoka was assigned to Makino Tadanari, formerly of Nagasaki Domain. In 1620, the domain kokudaka was raised by 10,000 koku, and was raised again by 2,000 koku in 1625. The domain, which extended across the Echigo Plain from western Niigata City, through Koshi District, Santō District and Nishikanbara District was excellent rice land, and also controlled the port of Niigata with its Kitamaebune trade, and therefore the actual revenues of the domain were far in excess of its official kokudaka. The actual revenues of the domain were 115,300 koku in 1712, and 142,700 koku in 1858 as opposed to its official rating of 74,000 koku. Under the rule of the Makino clan, the domain was noted for its military organisation and sponsorship of training in the various military arts. During the Battle of Hokuetsu in the Boshin War, Nagaoka joined the Ōuetsu Reppan Dōmei, and was the site of fierce fighting between pro-Tokugawa forces and the imperial army. Kawai Tsugunosuke and Yamamoto Tatewaki were two senior Nagaoka commanders during the war. After the defeat of the pro-Tokugawa alliance, the domain was reduced to 24,000 koku. In July 1871, with the abolition of the han system, Nagaoka Domain briefly became Nagaoka Prefecture, and was merged into the newly created Niigata Prefecture. Under the new Meiji government, the final daimyō of Nagaoka, Makino Tadakatsu served as domain governor, and later was a student at Keio Gijuku. His brother, Makino Tadaatsu was given the kazoku peerage title of shishaku (viscount) and served as Mayor of Nagaoka and as a member of the House of Peers.

== Bakumatsu period holdings ==
As with most domains in the han system, Nagaoka Domain consisted of several discontinuous territories calculated to provide the assigned kokudaka, based on periodic cadastral surveys and projected agricultural yields.

- Echigo Province
  - 263 villages in Koshi District
  - 83 villages in Kanbara District
  - 70 villages in Santō District
  - 17 villages in Kariwa District

== List of daimyō ==
#	Name	Tenure	Courtesy title	Court Rank	kokudaka	Notes
Hori clan (tozama) 1616-1618
1	Hori Naoyori (堀直宥)	1616-1618	Tango-no-kami ( 丹後守)	Lower 5th (従五位下)	80,000 koku	transfer to Murakami Domain
Makino clan (Fudai) 1618-1871
1	Makino Tadanari (牧野忠成)	1618-1655	Uma-no-jo (右馬允)	Lower 4th (従四位下)	74,000 koku	transfer from Nagasaki Domain
2	Makino Tadanari (II) (牧野忠成)	1655-1674	Hida-no-kami (飛騨守)	Lower 5th (従五位下)	74,000 koku	
3	Makino Tadatoki (牧野忠辰)	1674-1721	Suzuga-no-kami (駿河守)	Lower 5th (従五位下)	74,000 koku	
4	Makino Tadakazu (牧野忠寿)	1721-1735	Suruga-no-kami (駿河守)	Lower 5th (従五位下)	74,000 koku	
5	Makino Tadashika (牧野忠周)	1735-1746	Minbu-no-sho (民部少輔)	Lower 5th (従五位下)	74,000 koku	
6	Makino Tadataka (牧野忠敬)	1746-1748	Suruga-no-kami (駿河守)	Lower 5th (従五位下)	74,000 koku	
7	Makino Tadatoshi (牧野忠利)	1748-1755	Suruga-no-kami (駿河守)	Lower 5th (従五位下)	74,000 koku	
8	Makino Tadahiro (牧野忠寛)	1755-1766	Suruga-no-kami (駿河守)	Lower 5th (従五位下)	74,000 koku	
9	Makino Tadakiyo (牧野忠精)	1766-1831	Bizen-no-kami (備前守); Jijū (侍従)	Lower 4th (従四位下)	74,000 koku	
10	Makino Tadamasa (牧野忠雅)	1831-1858	Bizen-no-kami (備前守)	Lower 4th (従四位下)	74,000 koku	
11	Makino Tadayuki (牧野忠恭)	1858-1867	Bizen-no-kami (備前守)	Lower 4th (従四位下)	74,000 koku	
12	Makino Tadakuni (牧野忠訓)	1867-1868	Suruga-no-kami (駿河守)	Lower 5th (従五位下)	74,000 koku	
13	Makino Tadakatsu (牧野忠毅)	1868-1870	-none-	3rd (従三位)	74,000 ->24,000 koku	

== See also ==
- List of Han
