= Yamamoto Tatewaki =

Japanese samurai

Yamamoto Tatewaki (山本 帯刀; April 13, 1845 – October 24, 1868) was a Japanese samurai of the late Edo period, who served the Makino clan of Nagaoka. Also known by his formal name, Yoshimichi (義路). Yamamoto served as a senior commander of Nagaoka forces during the Boshin War. He continued to fight after the fall of Nagaoka, and was killed in action in Aizu in the fall of 1868.

Admiral Isoroku Yamamoto, an Imperial Japanese Navy leader during World War II, was adopted by Tatewaki's surviving relatives, in order to continue the family line.
