= Makino Tadamasa =

Japanese daimyō (1799–1858)

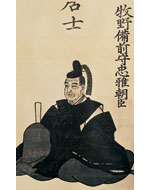
- Makino Tadamasa

10th Daimyō of Nagaoka
- In office 1831–1858
- Preceded by: Makino Tadakiyo
- Succeeded by: Makino Tadayuki

Personal details
- Born: December 2, 1799
- Died: November 30, 1858 (aged 58)

Makino Tadamasa (牧野 忠雅; December 2, 1799 – November 30, 1858) was a Japanese daimyō of the Edo period.

The Makino were identified as one of the fudai or insider daimyō clans which were hereditary vassals or allies of the Tokugawa clan, in contrast with the tozama or outsider clans.

== Makino clan genealogy ==
The fudai Makino clan originated in 16th century Mikawa Province. Their elevation in status by Toyotomi Hideyoshi dates from 1588. They claim descent from Takechiuchi no Sukune, who was a legendary Statesman and lover of the legendary Empress Jingū.

Tadamasa was part of the senior branch of the Makino which was established at Tako Domain in Kōzuke Province in 1590; and in 1616, their holdings were moved to Nagamine Domain in Echigo Province. From 1618 through 1868, this branch of the Makino remained at Nagaoka Domain (74,000 koku) in Echigo Province.

Tadamasa was the 10th-generation head of this senior line of the Makino.

The head of this clan line was ennobled as a "Viscount" in the Meiji period.

== Tokugawa official ==
Tadamasa served as the Tokugawa shogunate's forty-eighth Kyoto shoshidai in the period spanning February 15, 1840, through December 23, 1843.

Tadamasa held a variety of positions in the Tokugawa shogunate, including rōjū. A staunch supporter of Abe Masahiro, when Tadamasa became a rōjū, he was placed in charge of organizing coastal defenses. He resigned shortly after Hotta Masayoshi replaced the recently deceased Abe; Tadamasa himself died the following year.

== Notes ==
Preceded by Makino Tadakiyo	10th Daimyō of Nagaoka; 1831–1858	Succeeded by Makino Tadayuki
Preceded by Manabe Akikatsu	47th Kyoto Shoshidai; 1840–1843	Succeeded by Sakai Tadaaki
