= Makino Tadakuni =

Japanese daimyō

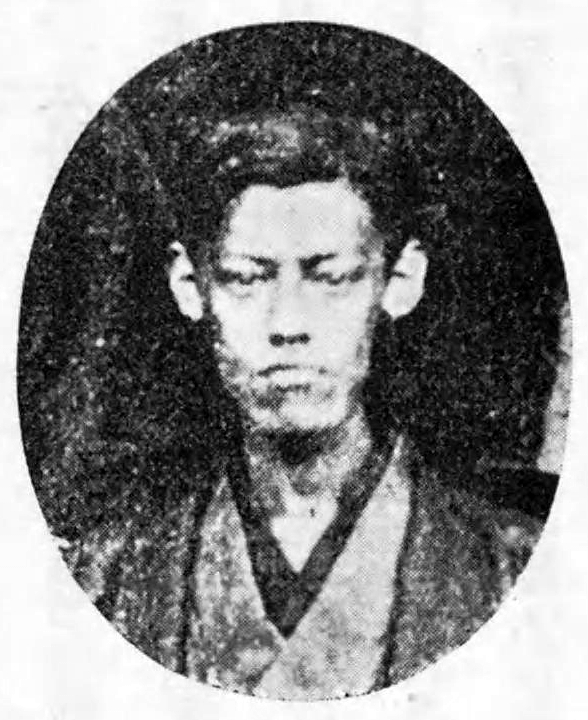
- Makino Tadakuni

12th Daimyō of Nagaoka
- In office 1867–1868
- Preceded by: Makino Tadayuki
- Succeeded by: Makino Tadakatsu

Personal details
- Born: September 26, 1844 Edo, Japan
- Died: June 16, 1875 (aged 30)
- Spouse: Mizuno Tsuneko

Makino Tadakuni (牧野 忠訓; September 26, 1844 – June 16, 1875) was a Japanese daimyō of the late Edo period, who ruled the Nagaoka Domain. Born the son of Matsudaira Munehide in the Miyazu domain, he was adopted as heir by Makino Tadayuki.

Tadakuni's wife, Tsuneko, recorded a diary of her life in exile after the Boshin War and the fall of Nagaoka Castle. As a traitor against the new government, Tadakuni was voluntarily confined to Shoei-ji in Tokyo. The status of the Nagaoka Domain was restored and endowed to Tsuneko's stepbrother, Makino Tadakatsu.

Preceded by Makino Tadayuki	12th Daimyō of Nagaoka (Makino); 1867–1868	Succeeded by Makino Tadakatsu
