= Kawai Tsugunosuke =

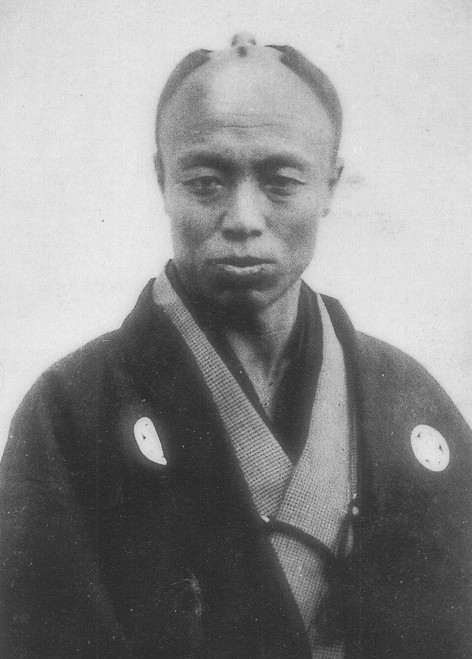
- Kawai Tsugunosuke
- Born: January 27, 1827; Nagaoka, Echigo Province, Japan
- Died: October 1, 1868; Aizu, Mutsu Province, Japan
- Occupation: Karō of Nagaoka Domain
- Spouses: Nagino Suga

Kawai Tsugunosuke (河井 継之助, January 27, 1827 – October 1, 1868) was a Japanese samurai of the late Edo period, who served the Makino clan of Nagaoka. Kawai was a senior military commander of Nagaoka forces during the Boshin War of 1868–1869. He escaped to nearby Aizu after his domain's fall; however, he contracted gangrene from an untreated leg wound, and died in Aizu.
