= Makino Tadakatsu =

Japanese daimyō

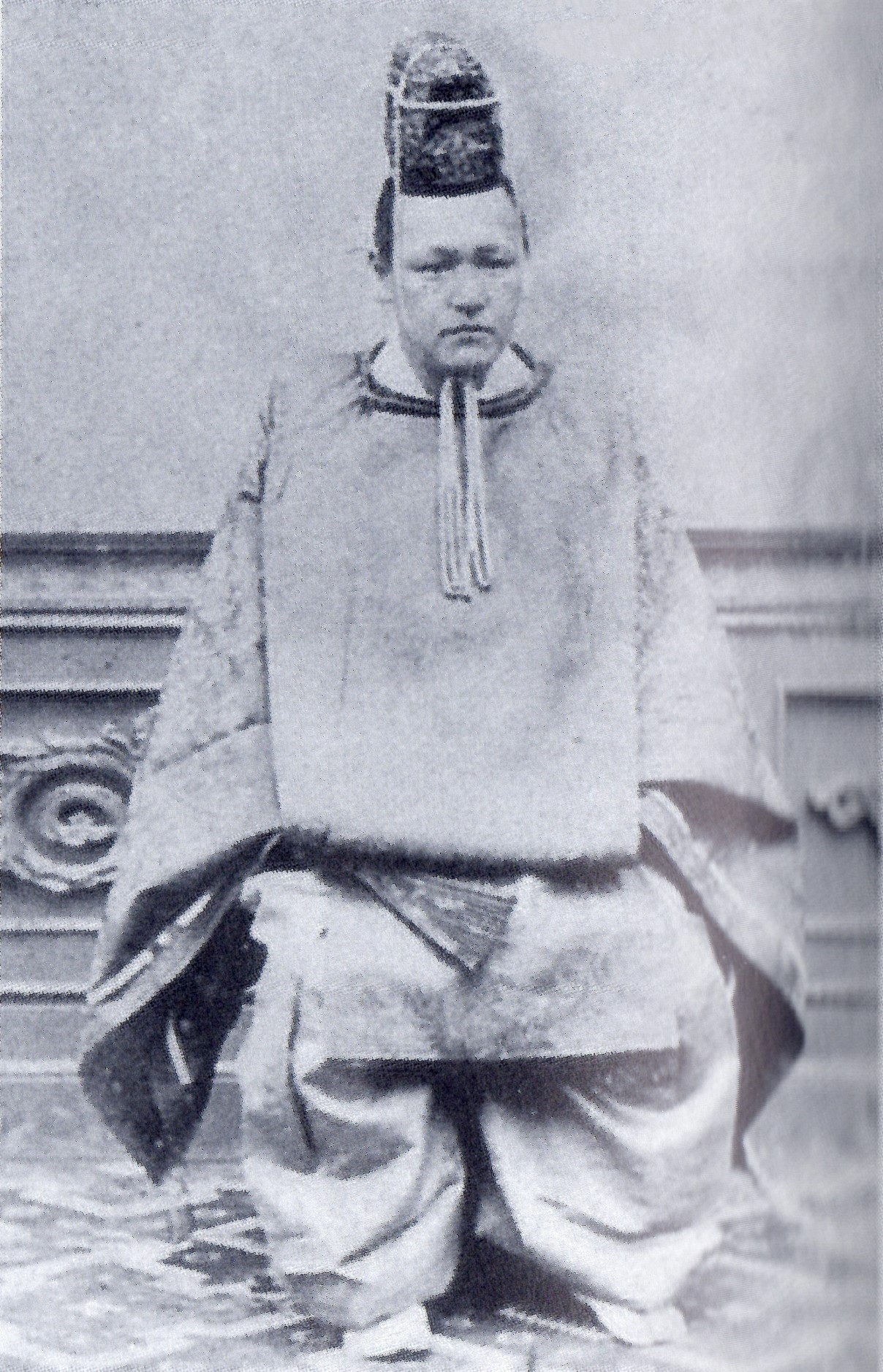

13th Daimyō of Nagaoka
- In office 1868–1870
- Preceded by: Makino Tadakuni
- Succeeded by: none

Personal details
- Born: April 12, 1859 Edo, Japan
- Died: February 3, 1918 (aged 58)
- Spouse(s): Ōkubo Shizuko, later Mizuno Seiko

Makino Tadakatsu (牧野 忠毅; April 12, 1859 – February 3, 1918) was a Japanese daimyō of the late Edo period. He was the last daimyō of the Nagaoka Domain and, after the Japanese feudal system was abolished in 1871, he served as a regional governor.

Preceded by Makino Tadakuni	13th Daimyō of Nagaoka (Makino); 1868–1870	Succeeded by none (domain abolished)
